= Massachusetts Provincial Congress =

Provisional government of Massachusetts

Massachusetts Bay Provincial Congress of Deputies
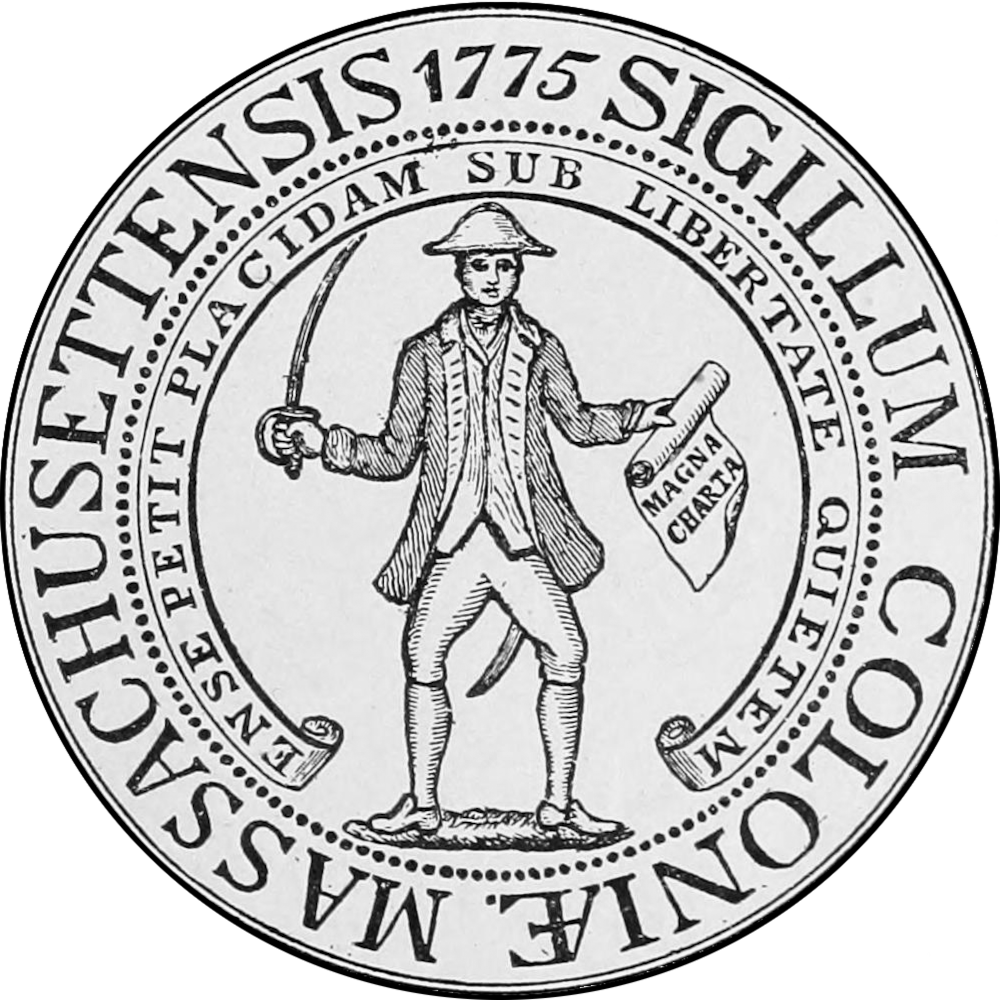
- Seal

Type
- Type: Unicameral Provisional Revolutionary Government of The Province of Massachusetts Bay

History
- Founded: October 5, 1774
- Disbanded: October 25, 1780
- Preceded by: Great and General Court of Massachusetts Bay (disbanded)
- Succeeded by: General Court of Massachusetts

Leadership
- Governor: Vacant; Massachusetts Governor's Council (pro tem)
- President of the Congress: John Hancock (1774-1775); Joseph Warren (1775); James Warren (1775-1780)
- Clerk/Secretary: Benjamin Lincoln (1774-1775); Samuel Freeman (1775-1780)

Structure
- Authority: Governmental authority in Patriot controlled territory in Massachusetts

Meeting place
- 1st Congress: Salem, Concord, Cambridge; 2nd Congress: Cambridge, Concord, Watertown; 3rd Congress: Watertown

Constitution
- Massachusetts Bay Charter

The Massachusetts Provincial Congress (1774–1780) was a provisional government created in the Province of Massachusetts Bay early in the American Revolution. Based on the terms of the colonial charter, it exercised de facto control over the rebellious portions of the province, and after the British withdrawal from Boston in March 1776, the entire province. When Massachusetts Bay declared its independence in 1776, the Congress continued to govern under this arrangement for several years. Increasing calls for constitutional change led to a failed proposal for a constitution produced by the Congress in 1778, and then a successful constitutional convention that produced a constitution for the state in 1780. The Provincial Congress came to an end with elections in October 1780.

== Termination of the provincial assembly ==
On May 20, 1774, the Parliament of Great Britain passed the Massachusetts Government Act in an attempt to better assert its authority in the often troublesome colony. In addition to annulling the provincial charter of Massachusetts, the act prescribed that, effective August 1, the members of the Massachusetts Governor's Council would no longer be elected by the provincial assembly, and would instead be appointed by the King and hold office at his pleasure.

In October 1774, Governor Thomas Gage dissolved the provincial assembly, then meeting in Salem, under the terms of the Government Act. The members of the assembly met anyway, adjourning to Concord and organizing themselves as a Provincial Congress on October 7, 1774. With John Hancock as its president, this extralegal body became the de facto government of Massachusetts outside of Boston. It assumed all powers to rule the province, collect taxes, buy supplies, and raise a militia. Hancock sent Paul Revere to the First Continental Congress with the news that Massachusetts had established the first autonomous government of the Thirteen Colonies. (The North Carolina Provincial Congress met earlier than the Massachusetts Congress, although North Carolina's body did not establish an actual government until 1775.)

Until the advent of the American Revolutionary War the congress frequently moved its meeting site, because a number of its leaders (John Hancock and Samuel Adams among them) were liable to be arrested by British authorities.

== War years ==
After the war began, the provincial congress established a number of committees to manage the rebel activity in the province, starting with the need to supply and arm the nascent Continental Army that besieged Boston after the April 1775 Battles of Lexington and Concord. Pursuant to recommendations of the Second Continental Congress, it in 1775 declared that a quorum of the council (which under the colonial charter acted as governor in the absence of both the governor and lieutenant governor) would be sufficient to make executive decisions. Although the assembly adjourned from time to time, the council remained in continuous session until the new state constitution was introduced in 1780.

This arrangement was only marginally satisfactory, and led to calls for a proper constitution as early as 1776. By 1778, these calls had widened, particularly in Berkshire County, where a protest in May of that year prevented the Superior Court from sitting.

These calls for change led to a failed proposal for a constitution produced by the congress in 1778, and then a successful constitutional convention that produced a constitution for the state in 1780. The provisional government came to an end with elections in October 1780.

== Conventions of the People in 1774 ==
In 1774 there were conventions held in the counties of Massachusetts in order to deal with the political crisis at the time. With the dismissal of the Provincial Assembly by the Royal Governor Thomas Gage the people of Massachusetts with patriot sympathies desired to form their own provisional government. Much like the Massachusetts Convention of Towns which met in Boston in 1768, these conventions were extralegal assemblies designed to address the concerns of the people of the Province of Massachusetts Bay. These meetings drafted their political causes for their convening and other grievances. These conventions, later styled "Conventions of the People", set the stage for the Provincial Congress and acted as its precursors.

=== Suffolk Convention ===
The Suffolk County convention took place in private homes in Dedham and Milton. Joseph Warren served as Chairman. The convention condemned the unconstitutional acts of the royal government (Massachusetts Government Act) and the presence of the British military in Boston.

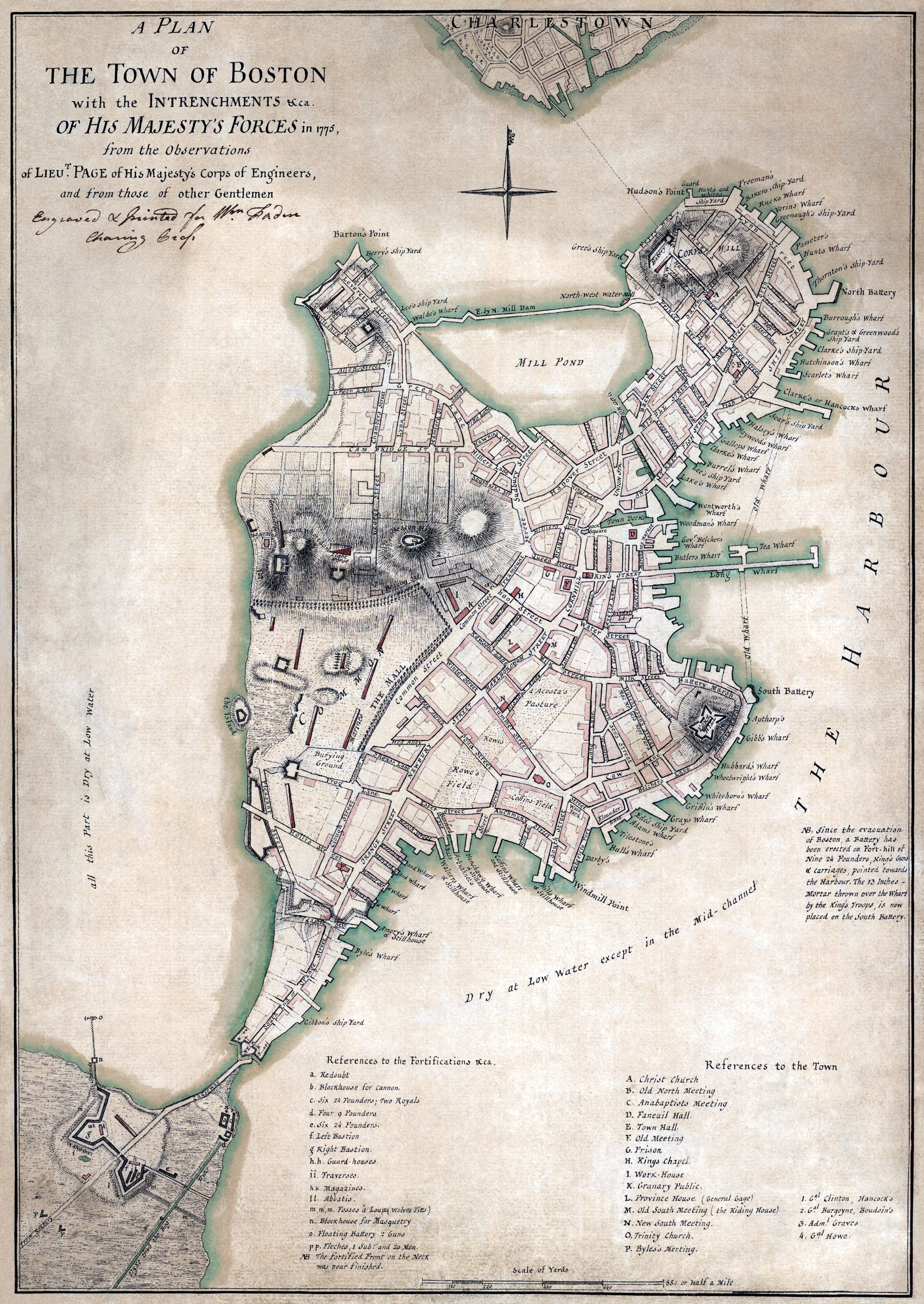
Map of Boston in 1775

Nineteen resolutions were passed at the convention. Firstly, the convention acknowledged that King George III was the rightful monarch of the British Realm, and that the colonists were the lawful subjects of the Crown. Further, that the rights and liberties afforded to them were hard fought and that it was the colonists' duty to defend, maintain, and hand down those rights. The then-recent acts of the British Parliament were stated as subverting the rights of the people, including the dissolution of the Provincial Assembly, the blockade of Boston Harbor, the subversion of legal protection, and presence of British troops in Boston. The rights of the colonists were deemed natural, constitutional, and guaranteed by the charter of the province. The convention stated the Province was not required to follow or abide by those acts and laws because they were the result of a "wicked administration" seeking to "enslave America." All justices, magistrates, or officials in general which were appointed by the provincial government were deemed illegitimate and unconstitutional, and that anyone who cooperated with the said government were acting and collaborating with an enemy force. Further, all officers whose duty it was to make payment to the state ought not to make it to the civil government before there was a constitutional replacement, and that any person who has accepted a position in the civil government, not by constitutional means but by "virtue of a mandamus from the king" had affronted the people of Massachusetts and became the enemies of the people of the colony. Therefore, the convention gave until September for all officials to resign their position.

The convention stated the fortifications that were built on Boston Neck were acts of aggression against the people. The commander-in-chief of the British forces had also acted unjustly by seizing gunpowder from the Charlestown magazine, as it was not the property of the government. The convention also condemned an act in Canada which enacted French laws and established the Roman Catholic religion. The convention said that these laws were hostile to the Protestant people of all America, and dangerous to their civil liberties. The convention also declared that all officers should be stripped of their commissions, and that new officers shall be selected by their respective towns based on ability. They went on to declare that the colonists would continue to act in the defensive to protect themselves.

It was further stated at the convention through resolution that as long as those who were fighting for the rights of their countrymen were being apprehended, officials of the government would be seized and held until the release of such persons. There was also a call to further boycott any and all merchandise that was the result of commerce with Great Britain, or any of its crown territories in the West Indies and Ireland. The convention formed a local committee whose purpose was to organize local manufacturers and artisans in order to promote their goods.

The Suffolk Convention called for a Provincial Congress to be called and that such a congress would align with the Continental Congress in Philadelphia until all rights are restored. There was further call to abstain from any violent acts which might damage private property in the province. The convention further went on to state that the committees of correspondence shall be dispatched in the event of invasion or emergency.

=== Middlesex Convention ===
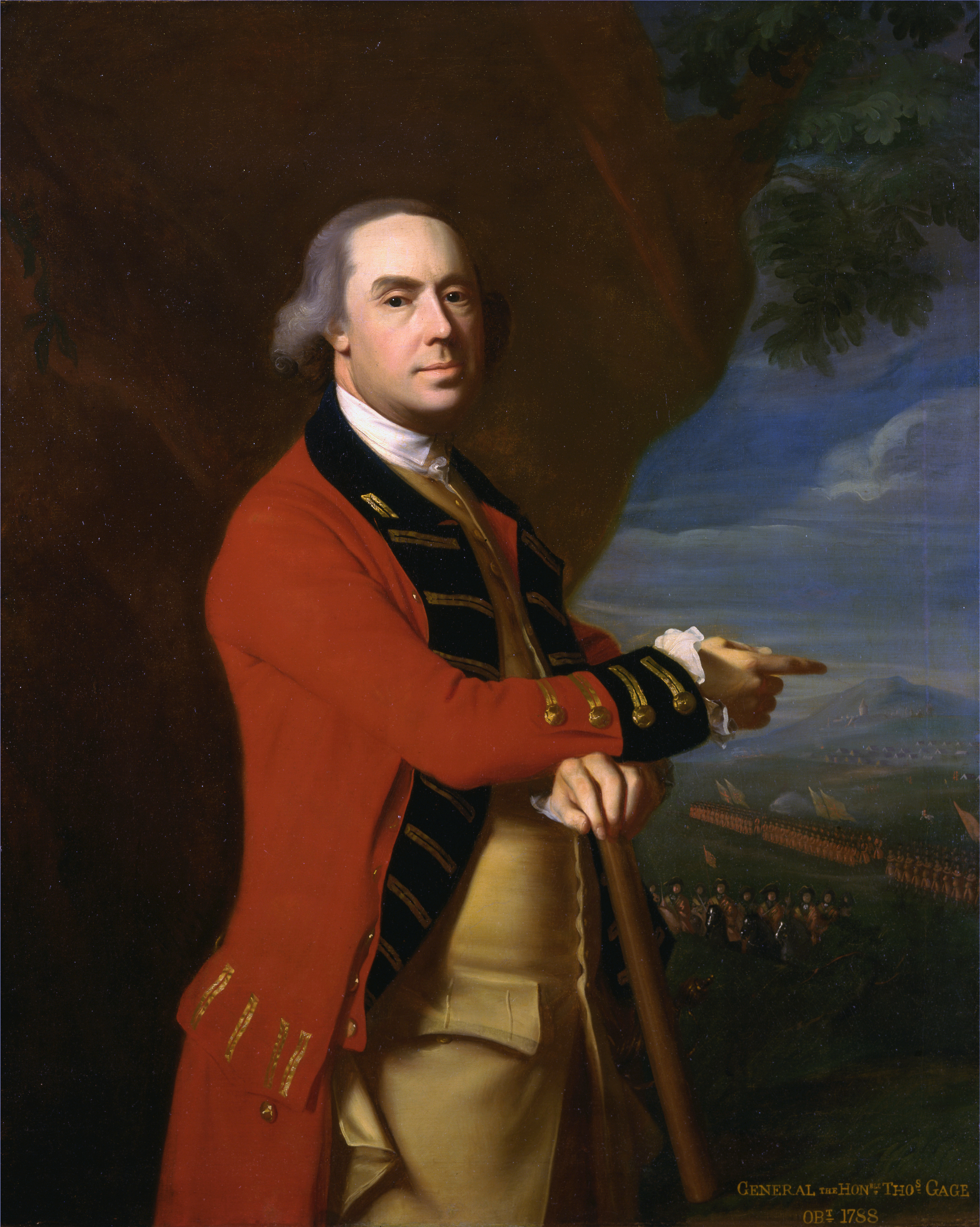
Portrait of Thomas Gage by John Singleton Copley. General Thomas Gage who was the Royal Governor of Massachusetts in 1774 as well as Commander-in-Chief, North America

The Middlesex County Convention took place in Concord in August 1774, with James Prescott serving as Chairman and Ebenezer Bridge serving as Clerk. The delegates resolved to say that the recent acts of the British Parliament are tyrannical and go against any notion of jurisprudence. The delegates reiterated their loyalty to the Crown, however they maintained their duty to protect their rights that had been granted through the Massachusetts Charter. The charter, said the convention, equally binds the colonists and the Crown, and that the acts of Parliament have broken that trust. The convention stated that their existed an unequal relationship between the colonists in New England and the government in Great Britain due to the severing of privileges without the colonists having the ability to respond politically. They also stated that because of this unequal relationship, and the subverting of the civil government through the Massachusetts Government Act that there can be no freedom for the people of Massachusetts as there is no true representative governmental body. This is further exacerbated, the convention claimed, by the removal of a just system of law with fair and independent jury trials. The delegates went on to express their view that this new order was a form of despotism which strips them of all liberty.

The convention called into question the legality of a sworn official serving in the colonial civil government calling them unconstitutional, therefore no person was obliged to follow their authority. The courts and all the motions and cases which are products of them were also deemed to be unconstitutional and therefore were not legitimate in any way. The convention declared their support for the establishment of a Provincial Assembly in which delegates from each town would go and be represented.

=== Essex Convention ===
The Essex County convention was held in on September 6 and September 7 in Ipswich with Jeremiah Lee serving as Chairman and John Pickering Jr. as Clerk. The delegates resolved that the Parliament of Great Britain has passed acts detrimental to all the colonies in North America but to the Province of Massachusetts Bay in particular. The convention described these acts and the actions of the local Royal civil government as being overzealous, unconstitutional, and threatening to the peace of the colony. The delegates declared that their inalienable rights which are granted to them as Englishmen were under threat. The convention declared the courts and local officials serving under the Royal administration as unlawful and unconstitutional. The delegates called for the formation of a local assembly to be called so as to have their guaranteed rights restored. The delegates declared their loyalty to the Crown however said they would act to ensure that their rights and liberties would not go on being tarnished.

=== Hampshire Convention ===
In Northampton on September 22 and 23 in 1774, the delegates from towns of Hampshire county gathered in assembly. Ebenezer Hunt was selected as Clerk and Timothy Danielson as the Chairman. At the end of the convention the delegates had drafted nine resolutions. The delegates first reaffirmed their allegiance to the King as long as he sought to defend their rights guaranteed them by the colonial charter. They went on to declare that the colonial charter is a sacred document and agreement shared between two parties: the King and the people. It is unjust and unlawful, they declared, for one party to withdraw from the charter without the input from the other, affirming that nothing done in the colony could be described as the desire to sever this agreement. Thomas Gage was declared to be an unconstitutional governor of Massachusetts Bay. According to the delegates by undermining the authority of the constitutionally elected assembly and by enforcing acts of Parliament that are detrimental to the liberty of the inhabitants of Massachusetts Bay.

The Convention echoed and supported the calls from the Middlesex Convention for the establishment of a Provincial Congress with each town sending delegates. It is only when there is a constitutionally beholden assembly that the civil officials throughout Massachusetts Bay could be seen as legitimate. Furthering these sentiments the convention asserted to role of the town meeting in the passage and management of laws. The final resolution of the assembly was to urge all the inhabitants of Hampshire County to "acquaint themselves with the military art" and to furnish all the lawful weaponry at their disposal.

=== Plymouth Convention ===
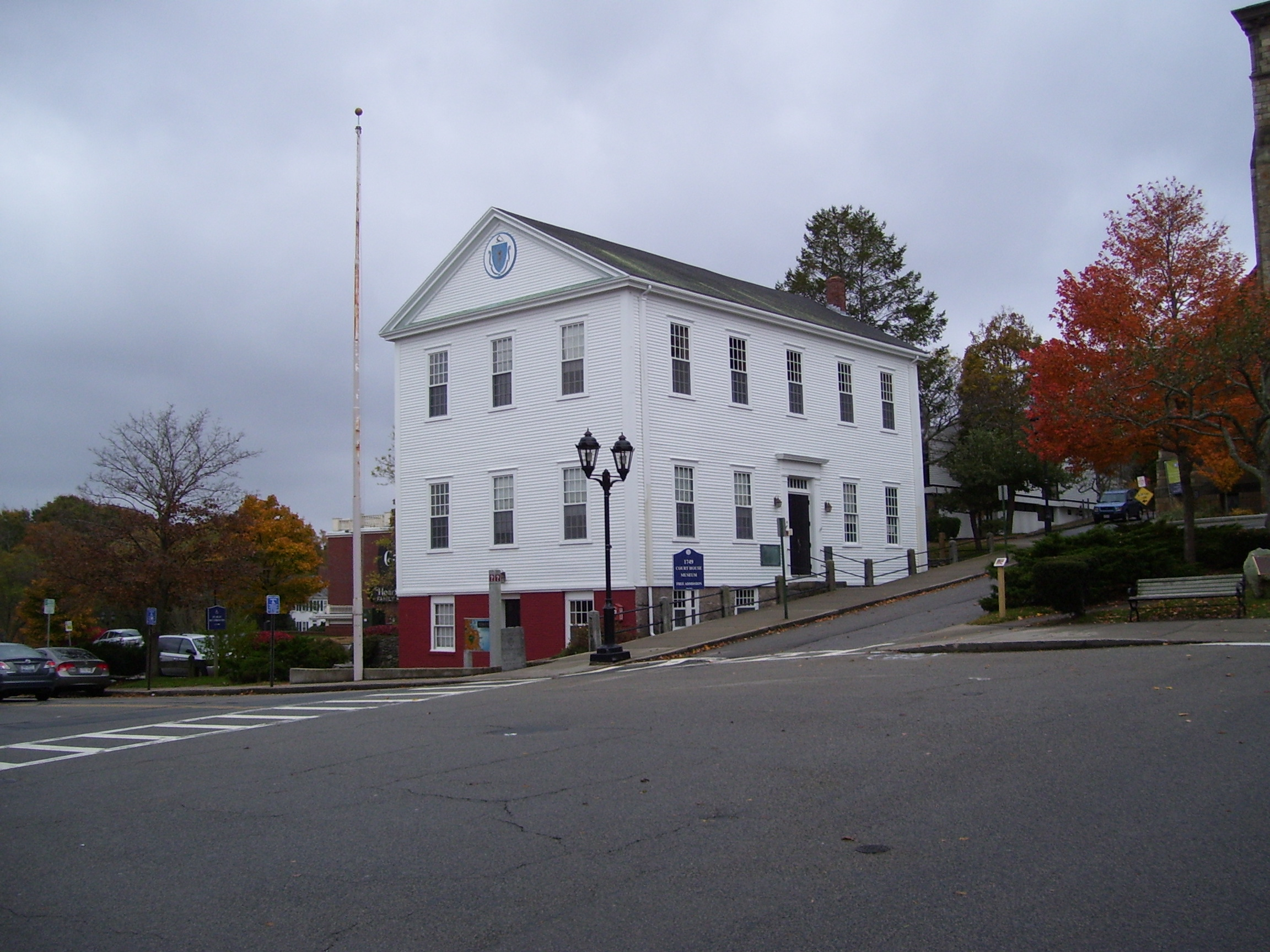
The Plymouth County Courthouse where the Convention took place

The convention for Plymouth County was held on its first day in Plympton, Massachusetts and in the Town of Plymouth for its second meeting. The dates of the convention were September 26 and 27, with Thomas Lothrop serving as Clerk and James Warren as Chairman.

Wheras, the British administration, instead of cultivating that harmony and affection, which have so long subsisted, to the great and mutual advantage of both Britain and the colonies, have, for a series of years, without provocation, without justice, or good policy, in breach of faith, the laws of gratitude, the natural connections and commercial interest of both countries, been attacking with persevering and unrelenting injustice, the rights of the colonists; and have added, from one time to another, insults to oppressions, till both have become, more especially in this colony, intolerable, and every person who has the feelings of a man, and any sense of the rights of mankind, and the value of our happy constitution, finds it now necessary. to exert himself to the utmost of his power, to preserve them...

— Plymouth Convention

The convention's first resolution was to declare that all the inhabitants of the American colonies are entitled to their natural rights and are not to be governed by any entity that they do not consent to. The delegates went to say that their only connection to Great Britain was through their inheritance of the colonial charter. They accused the Parliament of Britain of operating in a severe and unjust way, and curtailing their civil and religious liberties. The convention expressed that it was the duty of everyone in the Province to oppose entirely and to not in any way submit to this unjust government. The delegates said that the current Royal government is a "barrier of liberty, and security of life and property..." Because these officials are members of an unjust system, by accepting their positions they have marked themselves as enemies to the people they are supposed to be serving and living with. Therefore, the convention charges, these people who have neglected their own society have lost all virtue.

The delegates called for the creation of a Provincial Congress in order to properly represent the people of Massachusetts Bay. They further called for the people of Plymouth County to arm themselves and to become accustomed with military discipline. Declaring that any money paid to the Royal civil government may be misappropriated to causes that may be a detriment to the people, the convention asked all people to stop making any payments until the government, or a government, exists with a constitutional foundation. The construction of fortifications on Boston Neck and the seizing of the gunpowder in Charlestown were also described as overtly hostile acts. Similar to the Suffolk Convention, the convention in Plymouth said that due to the violation of rights of those in Massachusetts Bay, Crown officials should be seized and not returned until all patriots are returned unharmed. The convention also reaffirmed the importance of the town meeting in these towns and declared that the local government should go on uninterrupted. Another resolution passed urged the people to interrupt and impede an attempt at the civil government to any business that runs counter to the constitutional order of society, even though the convention was ended with a plea to avoid any riots or any acts that would greatly disturb the Province.

=== Bristol Convention ===
The convention in Bristol County took place on September 28 and 29 at the courthouse in Taunton with Zephaniah Leonard as Chairman. The delegates in Bristol declared that King George III was their rightful monarch and that their relationship to the British Crown went back to the reign of King William III and Queen Mary II who granted them the Province's colonial charter. And according to the colonial charter, the delegates argued, they had the right to organize their own governance and decide their own laws and practices. The convention passed a resolution which stated that they were opposed to disorder and acts of mob violence, however would ensure that the rights of the people of Bristol County would not be subverted, finally stating that they reserve the right to call their county convention into assembly whenever they saw fit.

=== Worcester Convention ===
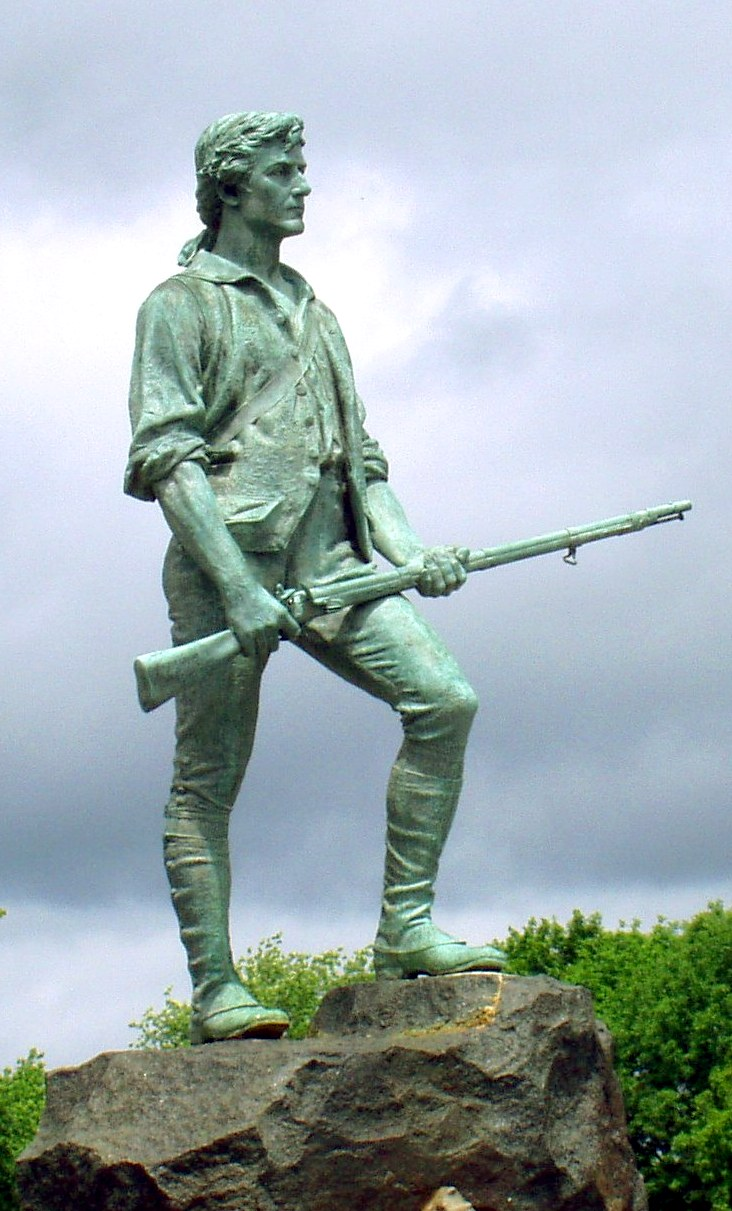
Henry Hudson Kitson's statue The Minuteman depicts a militiaman from Massachusetts

Assembly of the County of Worcester Committee of Correspondence

Worcester County's committee of correspondence held a convention of its members in September and August 1774 in Worcester. Chosen as Chairman and Clerk were William Young and William Henshaw, respectively. The delegation selected a committee which drafted resolutions for the greater convention to vote on. Much like the other conventions held in Massachusetts Bay the convention reasserted their loyalty and constitutional connection to the British Crown in the person of King George III. They outlined the connection they have to their land is through the Massachusetts Charter which guarantees not only their allegiance to the Monarchy but also guarantees them certain rights and privileges. They went on to add that the destruction of this relationship, i.e. the cancelling of the agreement by one party without the consent of the other, ensures not only the severing of the union between the province and Royal Government politically but also destroys the allegiance of the people to the Crown. Delegates pointed to the acts of Parliament, which they believed violated their chartered agreement, as being hostile. Adding that not only through political power had the Parliament shown hostility but through egregious taxation and the blocking of the port of Boston.

As a result of these actions the assembly called on every American to do what was in their power to oppose these acts. They resolved to say that Americans by boycotting British goods would hurt the people and commerce of Great Britain than it would to the people of the American colonies.

At the same time, on September 6, militiamen in Worcester prevented court officials appointed by the governor to take office in an episode that become known as the Worcester Revolt.

County-wide Convention

At the county meeting the convention elected William Young as their President. The convention voted on and passed all the resolutions which had been drawn up by the assembly of the Committee of Correspondence. The convention then added resolutions of its own. Firstly that all people must do what they could to disrupt and prevent the sitting of the Courts which were a part of the Royal civil government. Instead of relying on the civil government, which they saw as unjust, the delegates resolved that every community ought to organize itself in a matter of security and order. Adding that these communities are charged with selecting amongst themselves representatives to represent them at the wider Provincial Congress.

For military resolutions the convention determined that every member of the committee should obtain a full stock of gunpowder and that the town of the county should be properly armed in the event on an invasion. The delegates went on to say that the local militia should be administered in a manner which is respectful of the local population and it should abstain from destroying any property. They added that each town ought to select officers for its militia and that one third of the men in each town from ages 16 to 60 years old be available at a minute's notice.

The convention called for printing offices to be set up in order to adequately inform the population as to the resolves and motions being undertaken at the convention and any future assembly.

== First Congress ==
First Congress of Deputies
←	General Court	Massachusetts Provincial Congress § Second Congress	→

Overview
- Legislative body: Massachusetts Provincial Congress of Deputies
- Jurisdiction: Province of Massachusetts Bay
- Meeting place: Salem, Concord, Cambridge
- Term: 7 October 1774 – 10 December 1774
- Election: Town meetings
- Members: 286
- Chairman: John Hancock
- Clerk: Benjamin Lincoln

Following the proclamation from Governor Thomas Gage which dissolved the General Court of Massachusetts, members of the assembly and other Patriots convened on October 5, 1774 in Salem, Massachusetts. This first meeting took place at the Salem Court House and during which the list of delegates was formulated and officers of the assembly were chosen. John Hancock was selected as Chair and Benjamin Lincoln was selected to be the Clerk. The Congress then drafted a letter of declaration to be circulated in local papers declaring the assembly to be formed in response to the dissolution of the colonial government.

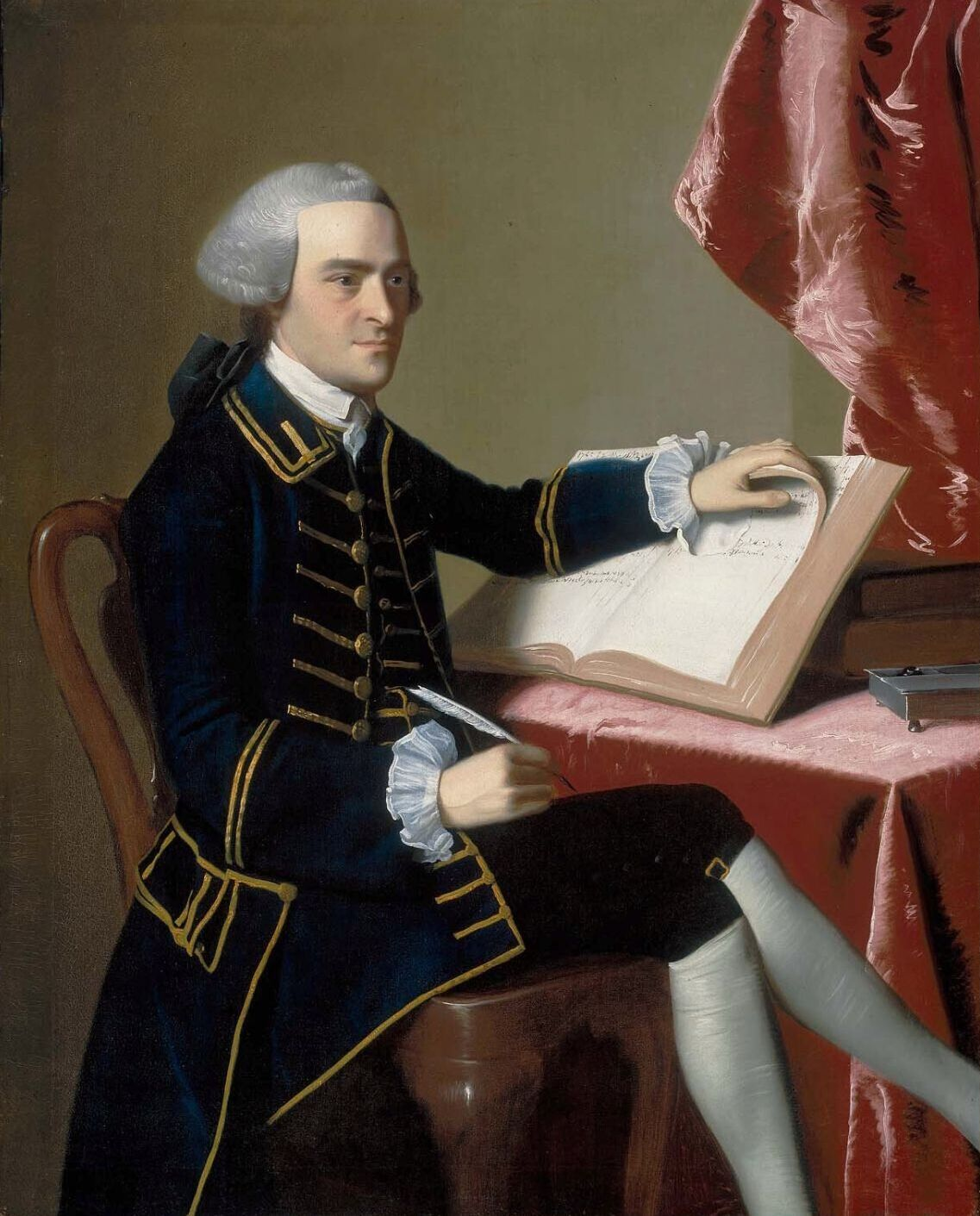
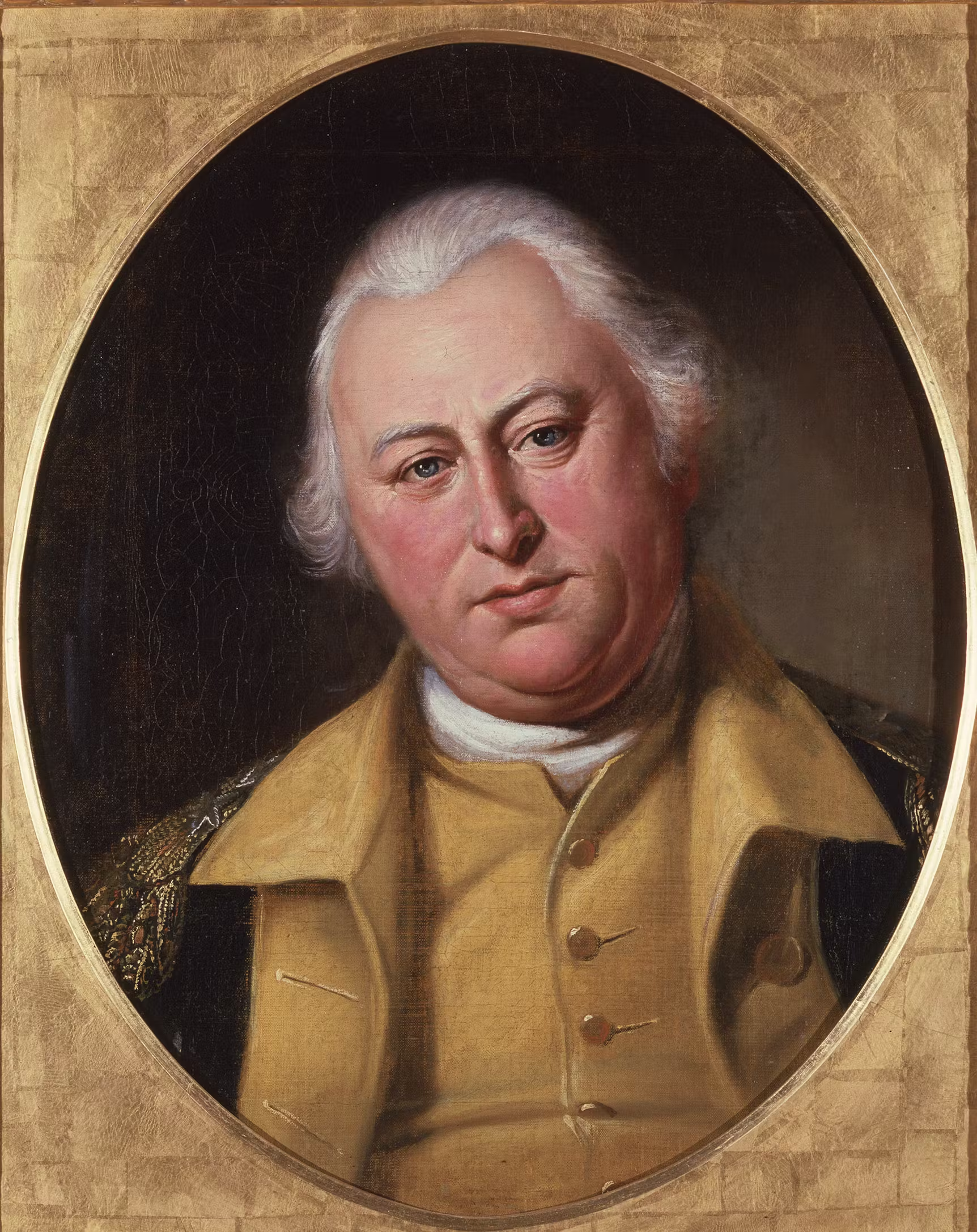
Chairman of the First Provincial Congress, John Hancock, and Clerk of the Congress, Benjamin Lincoln

The subsequent meetings in Concord, Massachusetts dealt with the political crisis and the congress formed various committees in order to deal with territory still under Colonial occupation. The congress declared that all provincial officers, whether they be sheriffs, tax collectors, constables, and so on, were to no longer pay money over to any royal officer and instead pay to the Provincial Congress. Delegates were chosen into a committee whose job it was to gather information as to the state and strength of the British Army in Massachusetts. The congress directed that a militia company which had not yet elected their officer were to do so as soon as possible. These officers were then to be directed to organize units of 50 minutemen to stand by at the ready. A "Committee of Safety" was then formed in order to provide leadership in military matters and in matters related to security. There were to be three delegates chosen from Boston and six delegates from the "country". The congress also elected three men to be general officers charged with command of the militia. The Governor's Council, which was elected in the colonial government in May 1774, was invited to form again and serve as an advisory council to the Congress. Also selected was a standing committee, also likened as a "committee of safety" yet distinct from the one chosen for security, which was to serve while congress was not in session to provide continuity in government.

The Congress voted on December 1 five members to be delegates to the Continental Congress in the following April. The five members chosen were, John Hancock, John Adams, Thomas Cushing, Robert Treat Paine, and Samuel Adams.

The first congress drafted letters and proclamations to then colonial Governor Thomas Gage with their grievances and opinions concerning his decisions and the decisions of the Royal government in general. These communications denounced Gage's actions as "warlike" and accused him of acting in a hostile manner to those who he was charged with ruling. The congress also called into question the constitutionality of the decisions made by the royal government in regards to the dismissal of the province's assemblymen and councilors. It is in this pretext that the Provincial Congress asserted its legal and ethical authority and justification. The first congress adjourned on December 10, 1774.

Officers

Officers of the Congress	
Position	Holder
Presiding Chairman	John Hancock
Clerk of the Congress	Benjamin Lincoln
Receiver-General	Henry Gardner
Executive Standing Committee	
	Member
	John Hancock
	Samuel Dexter
	Elbridge Gerry
	William Heath
	James Warren
	Major Foster
Committee of Safety	
Region	Member
Boston	John Hancock; Joseph Warren; Benjamin Church
Country	Richard Devens; Benjamin White; Joseph Palmer; Norton Quincy; Abraham Watson; Azor Orne
Commissariat	David Cheever; Benjamin Greenleaf; Jeremiah Lee; Moses Gill; Benjamin Lincoln
Provincial Council	
	Councilors
	John Irving; James Pitts; Artemas Ward; Benjamin Greenleaf; Caleb Cushing; Samuel Phillps; Richard Derby; James Otis; William Seaver; Walter Spooner; Jeremiah Powell; Benjamin Chadburn; Jedediah Preble; George Leonard
Command of the Militia	
Chief Commander	Jedidiah Preble
Second Commander	Artemas Ward
Third Commander	Seth Pomeroy

=== Deputies in Congress ===
Town	Deputies
Suffolk County	
Boston	Thomas Cushing, Samuel Adams, John Hancock, Joseph Warren, Benjamin Church, Nathaniel Appleton (Chaplain for the congress)
Roxbury	William Heath, Aaron Davis
Dorchester	Lemuel Robinson
Milton	David Rawson, James Boice
Braintree	Ebenezer Thayer, Joseph Palmer, John Adams
Weymouth	Nathaniel Bailey
Hingham	Benjamin Lincoln
Cohasset	Isaac Lincoln
Dedham	Samuel Dexter, Abner Ellis
Medfield	Moses Bullen, Seth Clark
Wrenthem	Jabez Fisher, Lemuel Kollock
Brookline	Benjamin White, William Thompson, John Goddard
Stoughton	Thomas Crane, John Withington, Job Swift
Walpole	Enoch Ellis
Medway	Johnathan Adams
Needham	Eleazer Kingsbury
Bellingham	Luke Holbrook
Chelsea	Samuel Watts
Essex County	
Salem	John Pickering, Jonathan Ropes
Danvers	Samuel Holten
Ipswich	Michael Farley, Daniel Noyes
Newbury	Joseph Gerrish
Newburyport	Jonathan Greenleaf
Marblehead	Jeremiah Lee, Azor Orne, Elbridge Gerry
Lynn	Ebenezer Burrill, John Mansfield
Andover	Moody Bridges
Beverly	Josiah Batchelder
Salisbury	Samuel Smith
Haverhill	Samuel White, Joseph Haynes
Gloucester	Peter Coffin
Topsfield	Samuel Smith
Boxford	Daniel Thurston
Wrentham	Benjamin Fairfield
Manchester	Andrew Woodbury
Methuen	James Ingles
Middleton	Archelaus Fuller
Middlesex County	
Cambridge	John Winthrop, Thomas Gardner, Abraham Watson, Francis Dana
Charlestown	Nathaniel Gorham, Richard Devens, Isaac Foster, David Cheever
Watertown	Jonathan Brown, John Remington, Samuel Fisk
Woburn	Samuel Wyman
Concord	James Barrett, Samuel Whitney, Ephraim Wood Jr
Newton	Abraham Fuller, John Pigeon, Edward Durant
Reading	John Temple, Benjamin Brown
Marlborough	Peter Bent, Edward Barnes, George Brigham
Billerica	William Stickney, Ebenezer Bridge
Framingham	Joseph Haven, William Brown, Josiah Stone
Lexington	Jonas Stone
Chelmsford	Simeon Spalding, Jonathan Williams Austin, Samuel Perham
Sherborne	Samuel Bullard, Jonathan Leland
Sudbury	Thomas Plimpton, Richard Heard, James Mosman
Malden	Ebenezer Harnden, John Dexter
Medford	Benjamin Hall
Weston	Samuel P. Savage, Braddyl Smith, Josiah Smith
Hopkinton	Thomas Mellon, Roger Dench, James Mellen
Waltham	Jacob Bigelow
Groton	James Prescott
Shirley	Francis Harris
Pepperell	William Prescott
Stow	Henry Gardner
Townsend	Jonathan Stow, Daniel Taylor
Ashby	Jonathan Locke, Samuel Stone
Stoneham	Samuel Sprague
Wilmington	Timothy Walker
Natick	Hezekiah Broad
Dracut	William Hildreth
Bedford	Joseph Ballard, John Reed
Holliston	Abner Perry
Tewksbury	Jonathan Brown
Acton	Josiah Hayward, Francis Faulkner, Ephraim Hapgood
Westford	Joseph Reed, Zaccheus Wright
Littleton	Abel Jewett, Robert Harris
Dunstable	John Tyng, James Tyng
Lincoln	Eleazer Brooks, Samuel Farrar, Abijah Pierce
Plymouth County	
Plymouth	Hon. James Warren Esq., Isaac Lothrop
Scituate	Nathan Cushing Esq., Gideon Vinal, Barnabas Little
Marshfield	Nehemiah Thomas
Middleborough	Capt. Ebenezer Sprout
Hanover	Capt. Joseph Cushing
Rochester	Capt. Ebenezer White
Plympton	Samuel Lucas
Pembroke	John Turner, Capt. Seth Hatch
Abington	Capt. Woodbridge Brown, Dr. David Jones
Bridgewater	Capt. Edward Mitchell, Dr. Richard Perkins
Kingston	John Thomas Esq.
Duxbury	George Partridge
Halifax	None
Wareham	None

== Second Congress ==
Second Congress of Deputies
←	Massachusetts Provincial Congress § First Congress	Massachusetts Provincial Congress § Third Congress	→

Overview
- Legislative body: Massachusetts Provincial Congress of Deputies
- Jurisdiction: Province of Massachusetts Bay
- Meeting place: Cambridge, Concord, Watertown
- Term: 1 February 1775 – 29 May 1775
- Election: Town meetings
- Chairman: John Hancock, Joseph Warren (pro tempore)
- Clerk: Benjamin Lincoln, Joseph Palmer (pro tempore) Samuel Freeman (pro tempore)

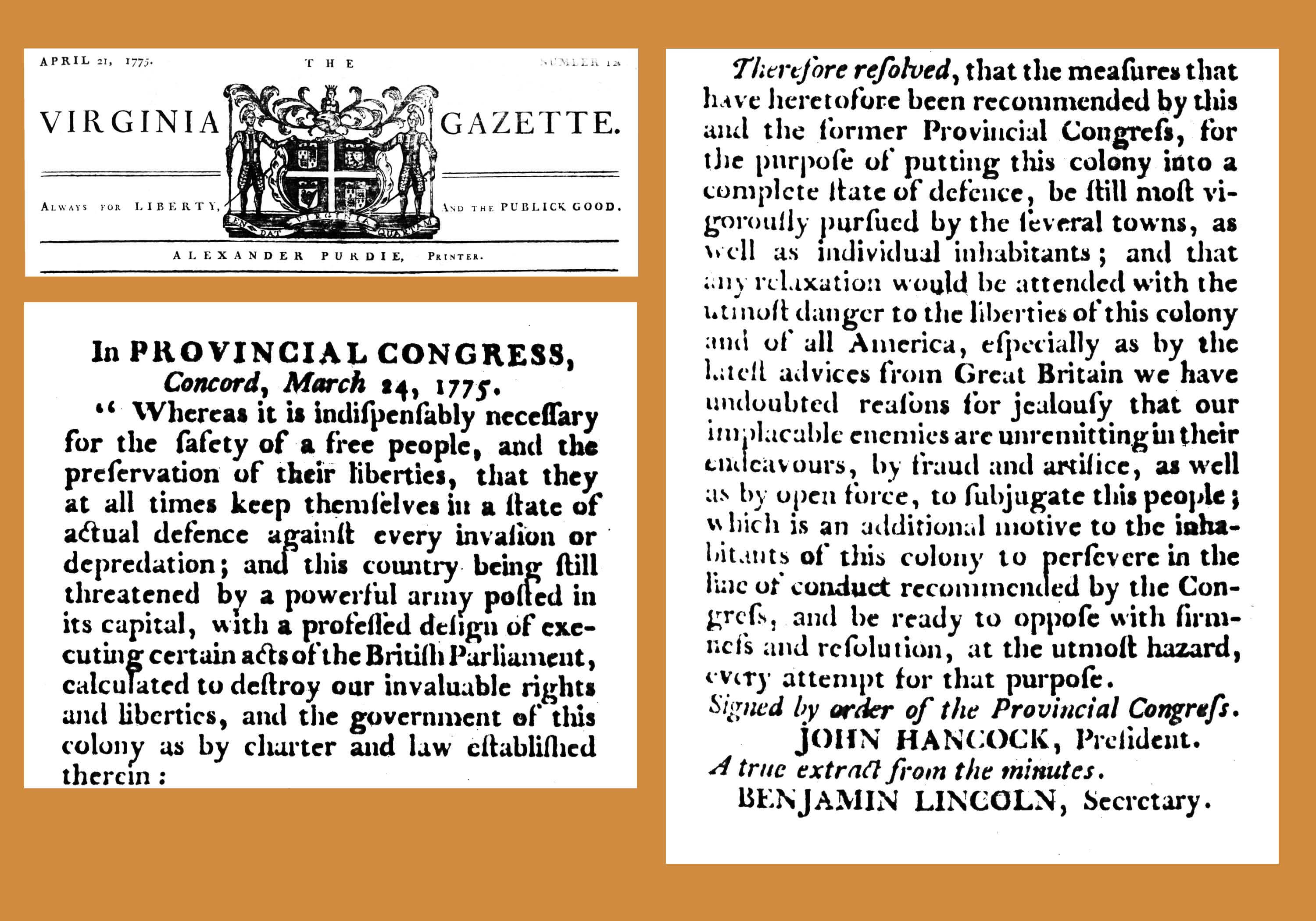
A March 24, 1775 resolution, signed by John Hancock, resolves that measures for "putting this colony into a complete state of defense, be still most vigorously pursued by the several towns, as well as individual inhabitants".

The Provincial Congress met again in Cambridge on February 1, 1775. John Hancock was unanimously reelected to be Congress President and Benjamin Lincoln was reappointed as Clerk, now styled Secretary. Delegates responding to meetings of Committees of Correspondence voted and argued on resolutions concerning the management of supplies and information for the militia and their encampment in and around Boston. Congress also reaffirmed that tax and revenue are to be paid to the then Receiver-General Henry Gardner instead of any Royal Officers who remained in an official post.

Samuel Adams, John Adams, John Hancock, Thomas Cushing, and Robert Treat Paine were also chosen to remain as the delegates to the Continental Congress and were to attend its next session in May. In the absence of the President of the Congress (then Hancock who was charged with the duty of representing Massachusetts in Philadelphia) the Secretary was given the authority to manage and adjourn the Provincial Congress. Congress also reestablished its authority by stating that Committees of Correspondence must adhere to the rulings of the assembly until another constitutional assembly comes into being.

A new Committee of Safety was chosen by delegates. The new members were to be John Hancock, Benjamin Church, Joseph Warren, Benjamin White, Richard Devens, Joseph Palmer, Abraham Watson, Azor Orne, John Pigeon, Jabez Fisher, and William Heath. The Committee of Safety was given new powers to determine on their own a Commissariat and its members. The Committee was also given full authority of the militia and all business which pertains to its upkeep and maintenance.

FRIENDS AND FELLOW SUFFERERS: When a people entitled to that freedom, which your ancestors have nobly preserved, as the richest inheritance of their children, are invaded by the hand of oppression, and trampled on by the merciless feet of tyranny, resistance is so far from being criminal, that it becomes the christian and social duty of each individual.

— Massachusetts Provincial Congress, To the Inhabitants of the Massachusetts Bay. 1775.

With the escalating military conflict with Great Britain the Congress adopted measures as to safeguard and preserve supplies in the event of the confiscation of materials by Royal authorities or further hardship brought on by war. This included the stockpiling of straw as well as linen. The delegates further resolves that any person who did business with the Royal Army would mark themselves as an enemy of the people of Massachusetts Bay. Delegates dealt with the issue of securing funds for its delegates and to estimate the commercial and economic cost that has been incurred due to the Boston Port Bill. Delegates then decided that an agent ought to be sent to the Province of Quebec in order to determine what the political atmosphere was and where public opinion regarding the Intolerable Acts resided. Congress also sent correspondence to the Board of Selectmen of each town to organize and train the militia due to the immediate military threat from Great Britain. Additionally the Congress prioritized the manufacture and purchasing of as many weapons as needed for defense. A committee was then formed in order to better communicate with the other revolutionary New England governments, as well as colonial governments in Canada.

March 16 was designated by Congress to be a public day of fasting and or prayer, and was to be done in respect to the current political crisis but also as continuation of custom from their forebears.

The Second Congress attempted to further regulate and centralize the armed forces in the Province. This included the institution of an oath of allegiance for the head of the Provincial militia/army to the President of the Congress, the regulation of the Committee of Safety, and the forced disarmament of all persons in the Province who were suspected of not having a willingness to join in the militia. In terms of martial matters the Congress also wished to expand the size of the standing army and expand its artillery and officer corps. The Congress also drafted a latter to the Penobscot tribe in attempt to elicit their support in the fight against Great Britain. The letter offers supplies and equipment to the tribe in hopes of the Penobscot enlisting other northern Tribes in war.

== Third Congress ==
The third Congress brought a return to legislative supremacy and a decrease in power of the executive. James Warren was elected as the congress' third president.

== Committee of Safety ==
The Committee of Safety was the parallel military and executive organization of the Massachusetts Provincial Congress. While at first the Committee existed as a legislative committee that existed under the authority of a standing committee of delegates and the Provincial Congress, the Committee of Safety at one point evolved into the de facto executive of the provisional state as well as the Commander-in-Chief of Massachusetts' armed forces (Massachusetts Militia and the Massachusetts Naval Militia). First organized in the first congress of the provisional government in 1774, the committee was at first a technocratic organization tasked with oversight of the military situation in Massachusetts Bay, with the meetings of the second and third congress the committee was given increased power and authority to govern Massachusetts while the Congress was not in session. The Committee of Safety was given the authority to name its own members of the Commissariat and to procure and administer all military supplies in the province.

With the conflict with the Kingdom of Great Britain expanding and the military of Massachusetts existing as a militia to be ready at a moments notice, the Congress saw a need for a permanent committee to oversee the martial affairs. The Congress only met occasionally and it was impractical to have the militia only answer to the Congress alone with the situation being so fluid.

The first Congress in 1774 rested supreme authority in the legislature. The executive was to be an Executive Standing Committee that served jointly with the Massachusetts Governor's Council. The Committee of Safety received order from the congress and was tasked with carrying them out as well as maintaining reports of the military situation in Massachusetts Bay for the delegates of Congress. The Commissariat was at first separate and distinct from the Committee of Safety and there was also another committee formed to deal with the militia and Selectmen of the towns of Massachusetts Bay. This Committee had nine members, three limited to the Boston and five for the country.

The Second Congress expanded the powers of the committee. When delegates gathered in 1775 the Committee of Safety was given more authority and expanded powers. The Committee would be selected from delegates at the congress however they could now select their own Commissaires and were given control of the militia. This meant the committee had the authority to muster the militia whenever it saw fit, determine the number of men it saw as necessary, as well as naming officers it desired for commission. All matters of high importance were still subject to Congressional approval in order to make sure it did not have too much independent power. The Council of War was created in the Congress while it was in session to serve as the "oversight committee" of the group as well as give it official orders. Fearful of overstepping its own authority the Committee made constant recommendations to the Provincial Congress in matters it believed were outside its control.

The Third Congress stripped many of the powers given to the committee by the Second Congress. The Committee of Safety was to no longer administer the military alone and instead was subject to the authority of the Commander-in-Chief of the Continental Forces. Further, its powers were limited to oversight of provisions and goods for the military, caring for prisoners of war and Tory prisoners, caring for the poor, and administrate concerns of public health.

== See also ==
- Massachusetts Convention of Towns (1768), a precursor to the Provincial Congress.
