= Boston Pamphlet =

1772 American revolutionary work

The Boston Pamphlet was a 1772 pamphlet published in Boston in the American Revolution. Written by members of the Boston Committee of Correspondence, the pamphlet outlined the rights of British American colonists and argued recent British policies were in violation of those rights. Although called the "Boston Pamphlet" by contemporaries, it was officially known as The Votes and Proceedings of the Freeholders and other Inhabitants of The Town of Boston, In Town Meeting assembled, According to Law.

The Boston Pamphlet had three sections of original material: "A State of the Rights of the Colonists", a "List of Infringements and Violation[s] of Rights", and a "Letter of Correspondence" addressed to the other towns of the Province of Massachusetts Bay. Traditionally, authorship of the three sections was attributed to Samuel Adams, Joseph Warren, and Benjamin Church, respectively, but historian Richard Brown argued that solitary authorship of any section was unlikely, and that each part was probably the group effort of a committee. A fourth section contained correspondence between Governor Thomas Hutchinson and the town of Boston.

At issue was the decision of the British government to henceforth pay the salaries of the governor, lieutenant governor, and judges of Massachusetts, which were previously paid by the Massachusetts House of Representatives. Colonists were alarmed because this was a step away from representative government, effectively making their leading officials independent of the electorate. In 1773, the Boston Committee of Correspondence printed 600 copies of the pamphlet and distributed them throughout the colony. Dozens of Massachusetts towns responded by passing similar resolves and forming their own committees of correspondence, which helped promote colonial unity in the evolving crisis that led to American independence.
