= Worcester Revolt =

1774 confrontation in Worcester, Massachusetts

The Worcester Revolt, or Worcester Revolution of 1774, was a confrontation between American militiamen and the British colonial authorities in Worcester, Massachusetts on September 6, 1774, during the American Revolution.

After the Boston Tea Party in December 1773 the British reacted with the Intolerable Acts, and in particular the Massachusetts Government Act, basically revoking self-government and replacing it by military rule. Thomas Gage, the commanding officer headquartered in Boston, dissolved the Massachusetts legislature on June 17, 1774, to which the patriots reacted with a wave of protests declaring that he had no right to revoke the Colony's Charter of 1691. As tensions grew in late summer, Gage was seeking to gain control over the colony's powder magazines (Powder Alarm) and also tried to use the colony's local courts as a means to keep order. Worcester was one of the more rebellious townships, so Gage wrote to his superior in London, the Earl of Dartmouth, that he "shall soon be obliged to march a Body of Troops into that Township, and perhaps into others, as occasion warrants, to preserve the peace". On August 16, insurgents had already forced the closure of the courts in Berkshire County and then did the same in Hampshire County on August 30.

On the morning of September 6 a force of 4,622 militiamen marched into Worcester and lined both sides of Main Street, meant as a gauntlet for the King's appointees to pass through. When the 25 court officials arrived in town the same day, they were denied entry to the court house and were instead escorted to the Daniel Heywood tavern to await further instructions. The court officials were well aware of stories of British officials being tarred and feathered (as Boston customs official John Malcolm had been in January), while apparently none of Gage's troops appeared to protect them. Under these circumstances the officials reluctantly signed documents disavowing their appointments by George III and, hats in their hands, were forced to recant out loud their oath of office while being paraded in a procession towards the court house. Gage then had to admit to Dartmouth that Civil Government was near its end and the Courts of Justice were expiring one after another.

The Worcester Revolt demonstrated that American patriots were able to overthrow British authority without a shot being fired. It also convinced British authorities that administrative measures alone proved less and less successful to sustain British rule and that an armed confrontation has become ever more likely. On April 19 next year, the Battles of Lexington and Concord marked the start of the American Revolutionary War.
