= John Turner (Massachusetts politician) =

John Turner, Esq. (December 12, 1712 – February 6, 1794) was a Massachusetts politician and was a delegate from Pembroke, Massachusetts to the first Massachusetts Provincial Congress in 1774. In his role as town clerk for the town of Pembroke, Massachusetts, he is known as the author of the "Pembroke Resolves".

== Pembroke Resolves (1772) ==
The Boston Committee of Correspondence read their Boston Pamphlet at a Boston town meeting held at Faneuil Hall on November 20, 1772, which enumerated many violations against the American colonists by British Parliament and the King of England. The pamphlet called for towns across Massachusetts to form committees of correspondence of their own. The citizens of Pembroke, Massachusetts held a town meeting on December 28, 1772 to discuss the Boston Pamphlet, and came to a collective agreement that the major grievances outlined in the Boston Pamphlet were reasonable, and they further determined to elect a Committee of Correspondence from Pembroke to create a set of their own Resolves against the British administration. Pembroke elected town clerk John Turner Esq., Dr. Jeremiah Hall (a friend of John Adams), Capt. Seth Hatch, Abel Stetson, and Quaker Samuel Goold to the committee. John Turner Esq. authored the official response, and recorded them in the Pembroke town records.

The Pembroke Resolves are known for containing one of the early direct references in the American colonies to an impending split with England:

"Resolved, that if the measures so justly complained of by this province and the other colonies on the continent, are persisted in and enforced by fleets and armies, they must (we think of it with pain) they will in a little time, issue in the total dissolution of the union between Mother Country and the colonies, to the infinite loss of the former and regret of the latter."

== Legacy ==
As of 2019, the Turner estate, located at the intersection of Route 14 and Route 53 on Washington St. in Pembroke, is the subject of an archaeological survey by the Fiske Center for Archaeological Research at the University of Massachusetts Boston.

Massachusetts Representative Josh S.Cutler (D-6th Plymouth) passed a Proclamation in the Massachusetts House of Representatives declaring December 28, 2018 as Pembroke Resolves Day, honoring John Turner's authorship of the Pembroke Resolves.
