= Massachusetts Constitutional Convention of 1778 =

The Constitutional Convention of 1778 was the first constitutional convention held in Massachusetts to draft a new state constitution following the state's declaration of independence in 1776. The convention that drafted the proposed constitution was composed of the elected members of the Massachusetts Provincial Congress and the Governor's Council meeting as a single body. The document drafted by this convention was approved in February 1778, and submitted to the voters of the state for ratification, the first constitution to be submitted for such a vote. It was soundly rejected by voters, leading to a second convention in 1779, whose proposed constitution was accepted.
