= John Pigeon =

American merchant (1725–1778)

- Born: March 17, 1725; Boston, Massachusetts
- Died: February 5, 1778 (aged 52); Brookfield, Massachusetts
- Occupation: Merchant
- Known for: Serving as commissary general of the Massachusetts Provincial Congress in 1775

John Pigeon (March 17, 1725 – February 5, 1778) was a merchant, a member of the Massachusetts Provincial Congress, and Massachusetts Commissary General during the American Revolution. Born in Boston he became a successful merchant and insurer before moving to Newton. In the lead up to the American Revolutionary War Pigeon was elected to head a committee of correspondence and to serve on the Massachusetts Provincial Congress. He became commissary of stores to the congress in February 1775 and in may became commissary general to the army established by the congress. The role ended when the army came under the control of the Continental Congress in July. Pigeon afterwards returned to Newton where he played a role in supporting the cause of independence and in ensuring the supply of gunpowder to patriot forces.

== Biography ==
John Pigeon was born in Boston, Massachusetts to Henry and Walter (née Ross) Pigeon on March 17, 1725. On October 26, 1752, he married Jane Dumaresq in Christ Church. The couple had two sons and one daughter.

Pigeon was called "one of the relatively few Anglican Whigs in Boston" in a biography of his son. The same biography notes that Pigeon served as a senior warden, a position he appears to have secured in 1763. Around this same time, the prosperous merchant entered the insurance business. Evidence of his Pigeon's success could be seen not only in his extensive newspaper advertisements for a variety of goods for sale, but also in his generosity to his church. At one point, records show that he loaned Christ Church £500 for construction purposes. By the late 1760s, it appears Pigeon was ready to retire to the country life, as his advertisements reported he was rarely in Boston and he eventually bought houses and land in Newton, Massachusetts.

On January 6, 1774, less than one month after the Boston Tea Party, the Newton freeholders appointed John Pigeon to head a committee of correspondence. By September 1774, Pigeon was chosen by the selectmen to serve as a representative to the Massachusetts Provincial Congress that would meet in October. On November 2, 1774, he was appointed to serve as clerk of the committee of safety under the chairman, John Hancock. It has been suggested that Pigeon's role in the committee and "familiarity Boston's Christ Church may have helped [Robert Newman and Paul Revere] devise the famous 18 April signal" that alerted patriot forces to the incoming British forces.

According to town records dated January 2, 1775, Pigeon donated two pieces of field artillery to the city which was received with thanks. These guns, kept in Newton Centre, would fire on April 19 as a signal to the local minute-men, warning of the advance of British troops on Lexington and Concord.

Continuing his work with the Provincial Congress, John Pigeon was elected to serve as commissary of stores on February 22, 1775. On May 19, 1775, the position of commissary general was created, and Pigeon became the first appointee to act "as a commissary for the army of this colony." Records show that Pigeon was overwhelmed with the role, as he offered to resign by the following month. At his request, a committee was appointed to assist with the work, and he requested both deputy commissaries and additional supervisors to the main camps. By July 1775, the Continental Congress took over the army and appointed a new commissary general for the entire army. Though out of the role as commissary general, the detailed records he left in his ledger are credited by researchers for helping document new information on the Siege of Boston.

Upon the end of his service as commissary general, Pigeon returned to Newton and continued service for the patriot cause. On March 4, 1776, he was asked to serve on a committee to promote and expand the manufacture of saltpetre to ensure ample supply of gunpowder. For his service before and during the Revolutionary War, Pigeon was described in a local history as "a zealous, liberal and energetic friend of the independence of the colonies."

Though his assets and property were located in Newton, Pigeon died in Brookfield, Massachusetts on February 5, 1778.

More than 40 acres (16 ha) of John Pigeon's property, eventually transferred to his son Henry and later sold outside of the family, was eventually sold in 1818 to the city of Newton for purposes of establishing a poorhouse.
