= Massachusetts Government Act =

Act of the Parliament of Great Britain

Massachusetts Government Act 1774
- Act of Parliament
- Parliament of Great Britain
- Long title: An Act for the Better Regulating the Government of the Province of the Massachusetts Bay, in New England.
- Citation: 14 Geo. 3. c. 45
- Introduced by: Lord North, MP; Prime Minister, Chancellor of the Exchequer & Leader of the House of Commons (Commons)
- Territorial extent: Great Britain; Province of Massachusetts Bay

Dates
- Royal assent: 20 May 1774
- Commencement: 1 July 1774 (Note: Section 1.)
- Repealed: 20 November 1777
Other legislation
Amended by	Prohibitory Act 1776
Repealed by	Province of Massachusetts Bay Act 1778
Relates to	Intolerable Acts

Status: Repealed

Text of statute as originally enacted

The Massachusetts Government Act (14 Geo. 3. c. 45) was an act of the Parliament of Great Britain, receiving royal assent on 20 May 1774. The act effectively abrogated the 1691 charter of the Province of Massachusetts Bay and gave its royally-appointed governor wide-ranging powers. The colonists declared that it altered, by parliamentary fiat, the basic structure of colonial government, and vowed to block its implementation. The act was a major step to the start of the American Revolution in 1775.

== Background ==
The act is one of the Intolerable Acts (also known as the Repressive Acts and the Coercive Acts), which were designed to suppress dissent and restore order in Massachusetts. In the wake of the Boston Tea Party, the British Parliament launched a legislative offensive against Massachusetts to control its errant behavior. British officials believed that their inability to control Massachusetts was partly rooted in the highly-independent nature of its local government. On May 2, 1774, Lord North, speaking as the head of the ministry, called on Parliament to adopt the Act on the grounds that the whole colony was "in a distempered state of disturbance and opposition to the laws of the mother country".

== Provisions ==
The act abrogated the colony's charter and provided for a greater amount of royal control. Massachusetts had been unique among the colonies in its ability to elect members of its executive council. The act took away that right and instead gave the king the sole power to appoint and dismiss the council. Additionally, many civil offices that had been chosen by election were now to be appointed by the royal governor. Town meetings were forbidden without consent of the governor. As Lord North explained to Parliament, the purpose of the act was "to take the executive power from the hands of the democratic part of government".

== Governor ==
Power was centralized in the hands of the royal governor, and historic rights to self-government were abrogated. The act provided that local officials were no longer to be elected:

[The] governor, to nominate and appoint... and also to remove, without the consent of the council, all judges of the inferior courts of common pleas, commissioners of Oyer and Terminer, the attorney general, provosts, marshals, justices of the peace, and other officers... and nominate and appoint the sheriffs without the consent of the council.

Most important was the provision regarding town meetings, the key instrument of local rule:

whereas a great abuse has been made of the power of calling such meetings, and the inhabitants have, contrary to the design of their institution, been misled to treat upon matters of the most general concern, and to pass many dangerous and unwarrantable resolves: for remedy whereof, be it enacted... no meeting shall be called... without the leave of the governor, [apart from one annual election meeting].

== Implementation ==
When Governor Thomas Gage invoked the act in October 1774 to dissolve the provincial assembly, its Patriot leaders responded by setting up an alternative government that actually controlled everything outside Boston. They argued that the new act had nullified the contract between the king and the people, who ignored Gage's order for new elections and set up the Massachusetts Provincial Congress. It acted as the province's government (later, beginning in 1776, the state's government) until the 1780 adoption of the Massachusetts State Constitution. The governor had control only in Boston, where his soldiers were based.

Parliament repealed the act in 1778 as part of attempts to reach a diplomatic end to the ongoing American Revolutionary War.

== Subsequent developments ==
The whole act was repealed by section 1 of the Prohibitory Act 1776 (18 Geo. 3. c. 11).

== See also ==
- Colonial government in the Thirteen Colonies

== Bibliography ==
- "Massachusetts Government Act; May 20, 1774". The Avalon Project. Yale Law School. 2008.
- Sosin, Jack M (1963). "The Massachusetts Acts of 1774: Coercive or Preventive?". Huntington Library Quarterly. 26 (3): 235–252. doi:10.2307/3816653. ISSN 0018-7895. JSTOR 3816653.
- York, Neil L (2011). "Imperial Impotence: Treason in 1774 Massachusetts". Law and History Review. 29 (3): 657–701. doi:10.1017/S0738248011000307. ISSN 0738-2480. JSTOR 23064102.
