= Massacre Day =

Massacre Day was a holiday in Boston, Massachusetts, from 1771 to 1783. It was held on March 5, the anniversary of the 1770 Boston Massacre.

== History ==
Each year, a featured speaker would deliver an oration to commemorate the massacre. The speech would subsequently be printed. James Lovell delivered the first speech in 1771. Dr. Joseph Warren delivered the Massacre Day oration in 1772 and 1775, expounding on conflicts with Native Americans and "the same almighty being who protected your pious and venerable forefathers, who enabled them to turn a barren wilderness into a fruitful field, who so often made bare his arms for their salvation, will still be mindful of you their offspring." Benjamin Church was the featured speaker in 1773, followed the next year by John Hancock. In emotional language, the early speeches reminded listeners of the occupation of Boston and the 1770 massacre while touching upon themes such as the dangers of standing armies in times of peace and opposition to the policies of the British parliament that the speakers believed violated the rights of the colonists.

The final observance of Massacre Day was in 1783. With the end of the American Revolutionary War and the securing of American independence, the Boston Board of Selectmen thought it was appropriate to replace the holiday with Independence Day, held on July 4 in honor of the Declaration of Independence. The final oration was delivered by the Rev. Dr. Thomas Welch and focused on the dangers of armies being garrisoned in cities.

== See also ==
- Evacuation Day (Massachusetts)
- Patriot's Day
- Bunker Hill Day § Commemorations
