= Benjamin Church (physician) =

British spy in the American Revolutionary War (1734–1778)

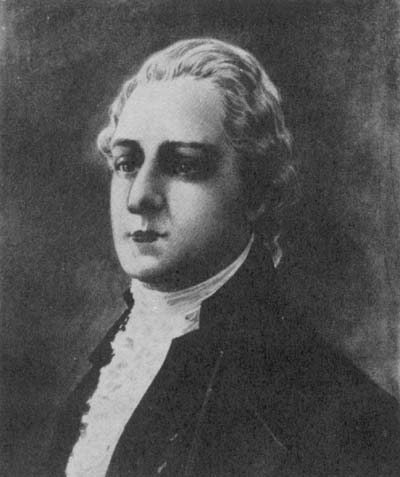
- Posthumous portrait of Benjamin Church

Committee of Safety
- In office October 7, 1774 – July 19, 1775
- Constituency: Boston

Deputy to the Provincial Congress
- In office October 7, 1774 – July 19, 1775
- Constituency: Boston

Personal details
- Born: August 24, 1734 Newport, Colony of Rhode Island
- Died: 1778 (aged 43–44)
- Other political affiliations: Sons of Liberty
- Spouse: Hannah Hill (m. 1754)
- Education: Harvard College
- Occupation: Doctor

Military service
- Allegiance: Massachusetts Bay; United Colonies; Kingdom of Great Britain
- Branch/service: Continental Army: Medical Service; British Army: Spy
- Rank: Chief Physician & Director General

Benjamin Church (August 24, 1734 – 1778) was effectively the first Surgeon General of the United States Army, serving as the "Chief Physician & Director General" of the Medical Service of the Continental Army from July 27, 1775, to October 17, 1775. He was also active in Boston's Sons of Liberty movement in the years before the war. However, early in the American Revolution, Church was also sending secret information to General Thomas Gage, the British commander, and when one of his letters into Boston was intercepted, he was tried and convicted of "communicating with the enemy". He was jailed but eventually released, likely dying somewhere in the Caribbean Sea in 1778.

== Biography ==
=== Family and education ===
Church was born in Newport, Colony of Rhode Island, the son of Benjamin Church, a merchant of Boston and deacon of the Hollis Street Church conducted by the Rev. Mather Byles. His great-grandfather, Colonel Benjamin Church, took a prominent part in the war with the Narragansett Indians and led the force which hunted King Philip to his death on August 12, 1676. Church (the third Benjamin Church) was a Mayflower descendant through his great-great-grandmother Elizabeth Warren Church, who was the daughter of Richard Warren, one of the Mayflower passengers. Benjamin's sister Alice married Boston printer John Fleeming.

The third Benjamin attended the Boston Latin School and graduated from Harvard College in 1754. He studied medicine with Joseph Pynchon, later continuing his studies in London. While there, he married Hannah Hill of Ross, Herefordshire. Returning to Boston he built up a reputation as a talented physician and a skillful surgeon. Church performed cataract surgery, and is also remembered for treating the eye ailments of John Adams. By 1769, he had acquired ownership over a slave named John Quamino, who later purchased his freedom with the earnings from a lottery ticket.

=== Political ambiguities ===
With growing friction between the colonies and Great Britain, Church supported the Whig cause vigorously with his pen. There is evidence that during this period he was variously considered as an ardent Patriot and as a secret Tory sympathizer. He examined the body of Crispus Attucks and treated some of the wounded in the Boston Massacre on March 5, 1770. In 1773, he delivered the annual Massacre Day oration, To Commemorate the Bloody Tragedy of the Fifth of March 1770, which marked him as an orator of high order.

In 1774, Church was elected a delegate to the Massachusetts Provincial Congress and later made a member of its Committee of Safety, which was in charge of preparing for armed conflict. Around the same time, Gen. Gage began receiving detailed intelligence on the Provincial Congress's activities. On February 21, 1775, the Provincial Congress appointed Church and Joseph Warren a committee to make an inventory of medical supplies necessary for the army and, on March 7, voted them the sum of five hundred pounds for the purchase of such supplies.

On May 8, 1775, after the Revolutionary War had begun, Church became a member of an examining board for surgeons for the army. A June 19 resolution ordered "that Dr. Church, Dr. Taylor, and Dr. Whiting be a committee to consider what method is proper to take to supply the hospitals with surgeons and that the same gentlemen be a committee to provide medicine and other necessaries for hospitals." As the chairman of a subcommittee of the Committee of Safety, he signed a report on May 12 which recommended a system of defensive works on Prospect Hill and Bunker Hill. Colleagues noted, however, that he had insisted on entering Boston soon after the Battle of Lexington and Concord, and while there he was seen in conference with British General Thomas Gage; he claimed to have been arrested and released.

=== Director General ===
In May, Church went to Philadelphia, Pennsylvania, to consult the Continental Congress about the defense of Massachusetts colony. On July 27, that body authorized the establishment of a Medical Department of the Army with a Director General and Chief Physician who would be head of both the Hospital Department of the first Army Hospital and of the first headquarters of regimental surgeons (located in the Henry Vassall House, Cambridge, MA). In the meantime, on July 2, General George Washington had arrived at Cambridge to take command of the colonial forces, and Church was one of the committee appointed to receive him.

Church had difficulty administering his department, and the regimental surgeons. A storm of complaints poured into Army headquarters, and Washington was compelled to order an investigation of the Medical Service. In his own defense, Church complained that rivals were jealous of his position and reportedly asked for permission to leave the Army. In the meantime, an incident arose which brought him before an Army court martial on October 4, 1775.

=== "Criminal correspondence" and court martial ===
In July 1775, Church had sent a cipher letter addressed to a Major Cane, a British officer in Boston, through a former mistress. The letter was intercepted by another of the woman's ex-lovers, and was sent to Washington in September. When two teams of gentlemen decoded it, they found it contained an account of the American forces before Boston, though no disclosures of great importance. It did, however, declare Church's devotion to the Crown, and it asked for directions for continuing the correspondence.

The matter was placed before a court of inquiry made up of general officers, Washington presiding, to whom Church admitted the authorship of the letter, but explained that it was written with the object of impressing the enemy with the strength and position of the colonial forces in order to prevent an attack while the Continental army was still short of ammunition and in hopes of aiding to bring about an end to hostilities. The court considered that Church had carried on a criminal correspondence with the enemy and recommended that the matter be referred to the Continental Congress for its action. The report of Washington to the President of Congress stated:

I have now a painful though necessary duty to perform, respecting Doctor Church, the Director of the Hospital. About a week ago, Mr. Secretary Ward, of Providence, sent up one Wainwood, an inhabitant of Newport, to me with a letter directed to Major Cane in Boston, in occult letters, which he said had been left with Wainwood some time ago by a woman who was kept by Doctor Church. She had before pressed Wainwood to take her to Captain Wallace, Mr. Dudley, the Collector, or George Rowe, which he declined. She gave him the letter with strict injunctions to deliver it to either of these gentleman. He, suspecting some improper correspondence, kept the letter and after some time opened it, but not being able to read it, laid it up, where it remained until he received an obscure letter from the woman, expressing an anxiety as to the original letter. He then communicated the whole matter to Mr. Ward, who sent him up with the papers to me. I immediately secured the woman, but for a long time she was proof against every threat and persuasion to discover the author. However she was at length brought to a confession and named Doctor Church. I then immediately secured him and all his papers. Upon the first examination he readily acknowledged the letter and said that it was designed for his brother, etc. The army and country are exceedingly irritated.

Church was briefly incarcerated in a room of the Henry Vassall House in Cambridge, where his carved name can be seen today.

The Massachusetts Provincial Congress arraigned Church on November 2. Despite an eloquent appeal in his own defense, he was unanimously expelled as a member of the House due to other "coded documents" of his being found in the trial proceedings that Congress regarded as proving his guilt. The Continental Congress on October 17, 1775, elected John Morgan "in the room of" Church, and on November 7 passed the following resolution:

That Doctor Church be close confined in some secure jail in the Colony of Connecticut, without use of pen, ink and paper, and that no person be allowed to converse with him except in the presence and hearing of a magistrate of the town or the sheriff of the county where he is confined, and in the English language, until further orders from this or a future Congress.

In accordance with this resolution, Church was confined at Norwich, Connecticut. Becoming ill, he was released from jail in January 1776, and was permitted considerable movement under guard. On May 13, he returned to Massachusetts under bond. He remained imprisoned until 1778, and was named in the Massachusetts Banishment Act of that year. Shortly thereafter he sailed from Boston, presumably for Martinique, but the vessel on which he took passage was never heard from again.

== Assessment ==
When scholars were able to open General Gage's files early in the 20th century, they discovered earlier letters with significant intelligence about the American forces that could only have come from Church. The files included notes that had been entrusted to him to carry into and out of Boston. Until then, historians had had difficulty estimating the degree of Church's guilt. It is now clear that he was supplying the British military with information in early 1775.

== Subsequent events ==
Church's wife and family were able to make their way to London where she was pensioned by the British government.

Church remained imprisoned until 1778, although being briefly released reportedly for reasons of health. Popular outrage led him to return voluntarily to prison for his own safety. Finally he was permitted to take ship to Martinique in the Caribbean. His fate remains unknown, though his father in a will dated 1780 indicates that it was not known then whether Church was dead or alive.

== Popular culture ==
- In the video game Assassin's Creed III, Church is portrayed as a member of the antagonistic Templars, and secretly joins the service of George Washington in order to influence him and his army. However, after losing faith in the Templar cause, he betrays his Order by secretly spying for the British and, after being exposed and disgraced, attempts to flee to England aboard the fictional man o'war HMS Welcome with supplies stolen from Washington's army. He is intercepted by the Assassin Connor Kenway and his father, Templar Grand Master Haytham Kenway; the Welcome is boarded and a defiant Church is beaten severely by Haytham before Connor stabs him to death and retrieves the supplies from a nearby island. He was voiced by the late Harry Standjofski.
- Church appears as a character in the novel Thieftaker by D. B. Jackson in which he examines the titular character.

== See also ==
- Intelligence in the American Revolutionary War
- Intelligence operations in the American Revolutionary War
- List of people who disappeared mysteriously at sea
