= Massachusetts Charter =

Document establishing the Province of Massachusetts Bay

Massachusetts Bay Charter
The charter granted by Their Majeſties King William and Queen Mary to the inhabitants of the province of the Maſſachuſetts-Bay, in New England
- Royal Coat of Arms of King William III and Queen Mary II
- Type: Royal Charter, Land Grant
- Context: British colonization of the Americas; Glorious Revolution; Dissolution of the Dominion of New England
- Signed: October 7, 1691
- Location: Westminster
- Expiration: October 25, 1780
- Signatories: Sir George Hutchins; Sir William Rawlinson; Sir John Trevor
- Language: English

The Massachusetts Charter of 1691 was a charter that formally established the Province of Massachusetts Bay. Issued by the government of William III and Mary II, the corulers of the Kingdom of England, the charter defined the government of the colony, whose lands were drawn from those previously belonging to the Massachusetts Bay Colony, Plymouth Colony, and portions of the Province of New York. The territorial claims embodied in the charter also encompassed all of present-day Maine (some of which had been claimed by the Massachusetts Bay Colony), New Brunswick, and Nova Scotia.

The charter was approved by William and Mary on October 7, 1691, and established English rule of the colony by appointing a governor, deputy governor, and secretary, to be elected by members of the council. It took away many of its rights of self-government that had previously been enjoyed by Massachusetts and Plymouth authorities, transitioning the power in Boston from elected to royally appointed governors. William and Mary appointed Sir William Phips as the new governor. The charter established freedom of worship for Christians (not including Roman Catholics, referred to in the charter as "Papists") and removed religious restrictions on voting. The charter reserved the right of free fishery in Massachusetts to English subjects.

Towns across the colony grew in status as a result of the charter.

== History ==
With the Glorious Revolution and the 1689 Boston revolt, the Dominion of New England fell apart. The dominion had been an attempt by the Crown to consolidate some North American colonies into one entity and consisted of the Massachusetts Bay Colony, Province of New Hampshire, Plymouth Colony, Colony of Rhode Island and Providence Plantations, Connecticut Colony, Province of New York, and Province of New Jersey. With the breakup of the dominion, the Crown consolidated colonies around New England, specifically the Massachusetts Bay Colony, the Plymouth Colony, and territories such as Martha's Vineyard and Nantucket. With the dissolution of the dominion, many colonies were concerned about their future status of annexation by other colonies. For instance, the Plymouth Colony was originally meant to be transferred to the Colony of New York, but the colonial leaders insisted that they become part of the Massachusetts Bay Colony instead.

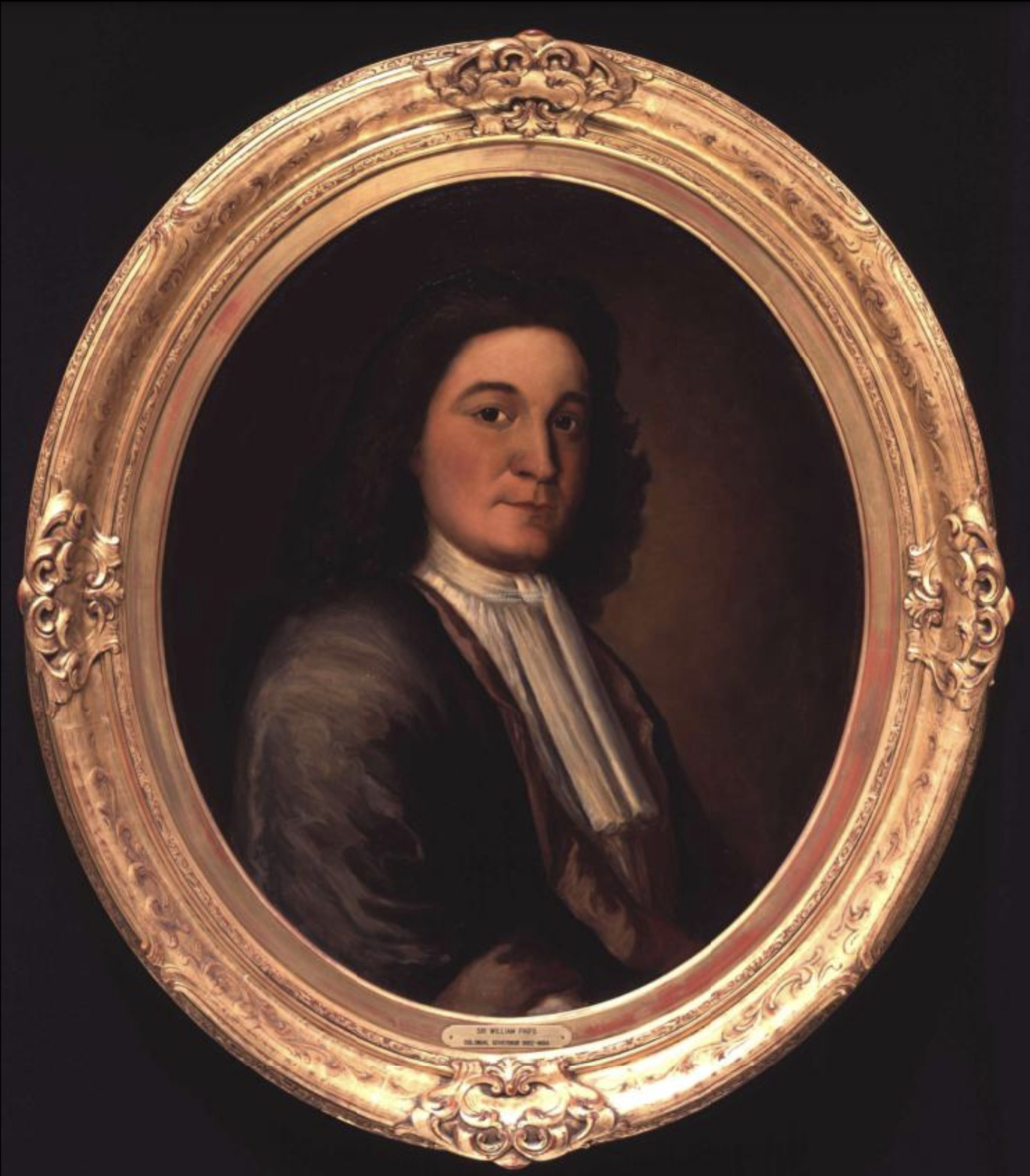
Portrait of Sir William Phips, who brought the Massachusetts Charter to New England from London

A draft of the charter was drawn up by the Attorney-General that allowed the Royal Governor to be chosen by the Crown, but the Governor's Council, the deputy governor, and the lower house of the General Court were to be elected by the colonists. These proposals were dismissed by the Privy Council on the grounds it gave too much control to the colonists and diminished the rightful authority of the Crown. In 1692, William Phips arrived in Boston with a copy of the new charter that was written by the Privy Council, although many in Massachusetts Bay objected to their not being able to return to their original 1629 charter (other colonies were allowed to return to their original charters). Despite opposition from many colonial leaders, when Phips arrived, he assembled the General Court, and the majority of members approved the charter and declared a day of prayer and thanksgiving.

== Effects ==
Other than an increase in land under control of the General Court in Boston were other "constitutional" changes. The religious requirement that had existed for suffrage was changed to a property requirement, which widened the margin of those men able to vote. The lower house of the General Court was to remain intact and allowed to continue to pass governmental rulings, with the condition that the Royal Governor had veto power. The upper house of the legislature was to be codified as the Governor's Council, instead of the previous "Board of assistants." The councilors were to be elected by the General Court with the Governor's assent. The General Court was to be given control of most Provincial affairs, aside from admiralty and commercial rulings, areas that were to remain under the control of Royal Officers appointed by the monarchy. The Governor was given control of the militia, but the House of Representatives had to consent to any officers receiving commission. The General Court was also given authority of the treasury, which included the Governor's as well as all royal officer's pay. With a friction existing between the General Court and the Governor, the Royal Governor was limited in power and authority in most matters to that of a head of state, rather than a head of government.

With the passage of what came to be known as the Intolerable Acts by the Parliament of England, many colonists became dissatisfied with the governmental arrangement. The political tension culminated in the Boston Tea Party, which resulted in the cancellation and dissolution of the General Court by Thomas Gage. The members of the General Court cited the 1691 Charter as their constitutional authority and did not recognize the actions of Gage as legitimate. The delegates then met and formed the Massachusetts Provincial Congress in 1774. The Provincial Congress became the revolutionary government of the Province of Massachusetts Bay, with the 1691 charter acting as the de facto constitution of Massachusetts Bay until the formulation and passage of the Constitution of Massachusetts in 1780.

== See also ==
- Charter of the Massachusetts Bay Company
- Mayflower Compact
- Massachusetts Body of Liberties
- Constitution of Massachusetts
