= Province of Massachusetts Bay =

British colony in North America from 1691 to 1776

- 1691–1780
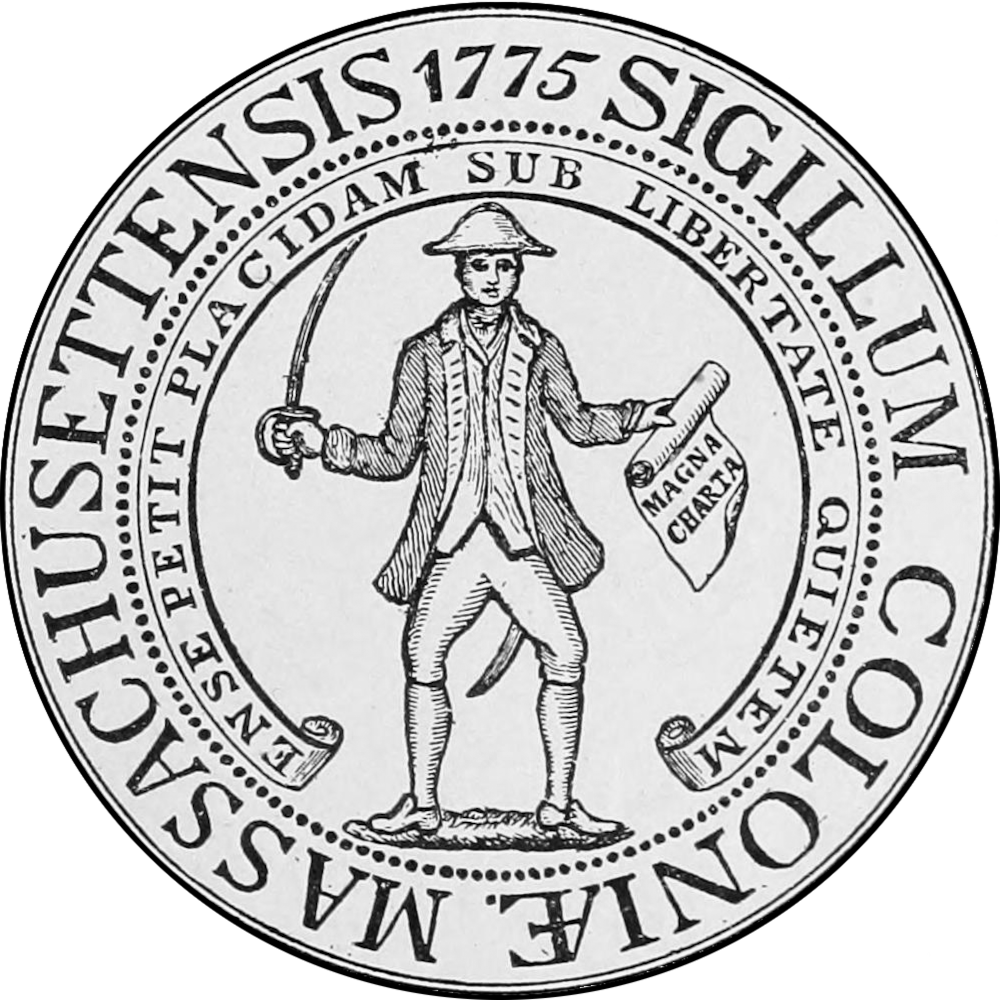
- Flag Royal coat of arms (1691–1774) Seal of the Provincial Congress (1774–1780)
- Anthem: God Save the King (1745–1774)
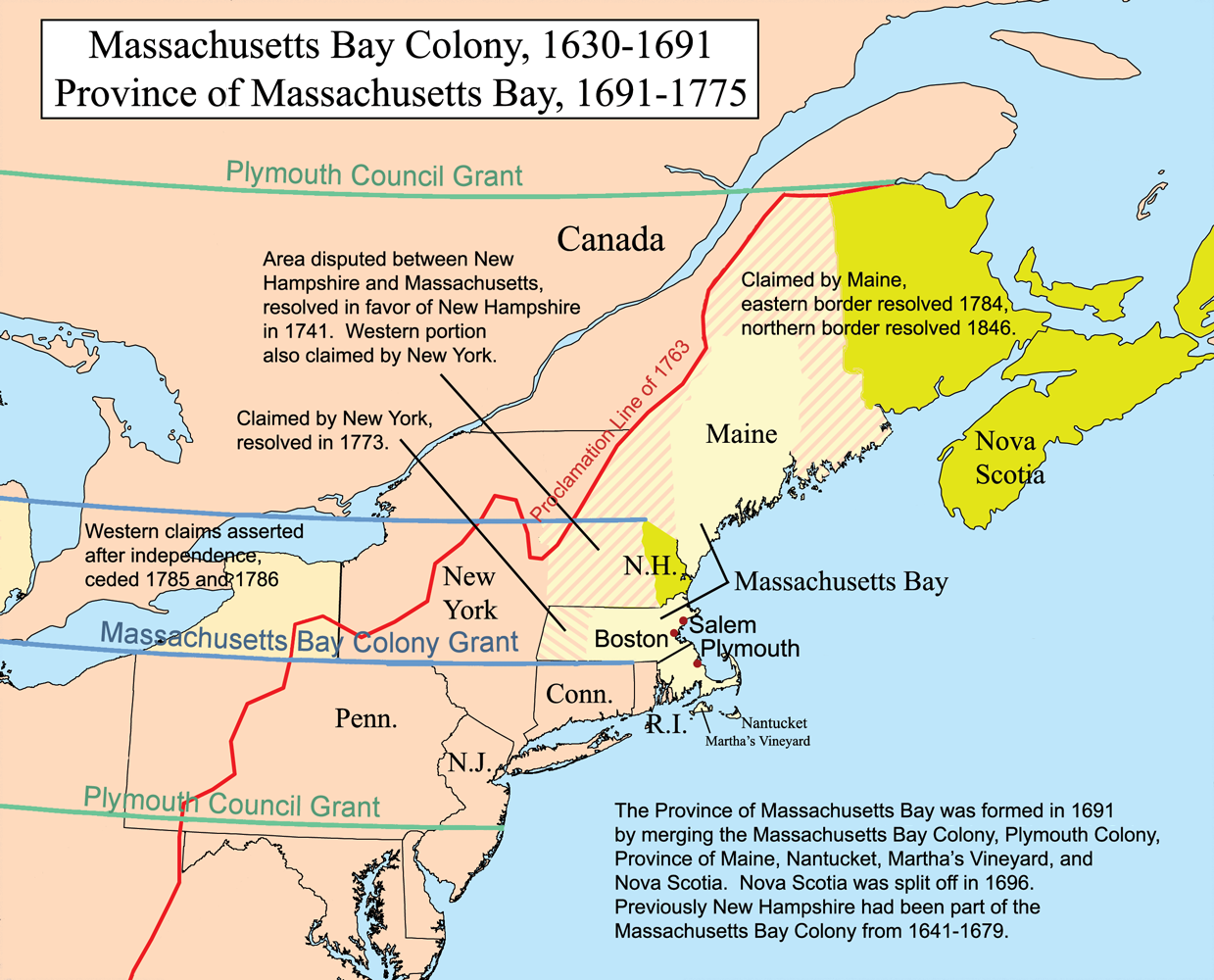
- Map depicting the colonial claims related to the province
- Capital: Boston
- Common languages: English, Massachusett, Mi'kmaq
- Religion: Congregationalism
- Government: Self-governing colony (1691–1774); Crown colony (1774); Provisional government (1774–1780)
- Monarch
  - 1691–1694: William III & Mary II
  - 1760–1776: George III
- Governor
  - 1692–1694: William Phips
  - 1774–1775: Thomas Gage
- President of the Congress
  - 1774–1775: John Hancock
  - 1775: Joseph Warren
  - 1775–1780: James Warren
- Legislature: Great and General Court (1691–1774); Massachusetts Provincial Congress (1774–1780)
- Historical era: British colonization of the Americas; American Revolution
  - Massachusetts Charter issued: October 7, 1691
  - Massachusetts Government Act: May 20, 1774
  - Provincial Congress established: October 4, 1774
  - Massachusetts Constitution adopted: October 25, 1780
- Currency: Massachusetts pound, Spanish dollar, US Dollar
Preceded by
Plymouth Colony
Massachusetts Bay Colony
Province of Maine
Acadia
Territory of Sagadahock
Succeeded by
Massachusetts
Nova Scotia
- Today part of: Canada; United States

The Province of Massachusetts Bay was a colony in New England which became one of the thirteen original states of the United States. It was chartered on October 7, 1691, by William III and Mary II, the joint monarchs of the kingdoms of England, Scotland, and Ireland, and was based on the merging of several earlier British colonies in New England. The charter took effect on May 14, 1692, and included the Massachusetts Bay Colony, the Plymouth Colony, the Province of Maine, the Territory of Sagadahock, Martha's Vineyard, Nantucket, Nova Scotia, and New Brunswick; the Commonwealth of Massachusetts is the direct successor. Maine has been a separate state since 1820, and Nova Scotia and New Brunswick are now Canadian provinces, having been part of the colony only until 1697.

The name Massachusetts comes from the Massachusett Indians, an Algonquian tribe. It has been translated as "at the great hill", "at the place of large hills", or "at the range of hills", referencing the Blue Hills and Great Blue Hill, respectively.

== History ==
Historical population
Year	Pop.	±%
1700	55,941	—
1710	62,390	+11.5%
1720	91,008	+45.9%
1730	114,116	+25.4%
1740	151,613	+32.9%
1750	188,000	+24.0%
1760	220,600	+17.3%
1770	266,565	+20.8%
1780	317,760	+19.2%
Source: 1700–1760; 1770–1780 including District of Maine

Colonial settlement of the shores of Massachusetts Bay began in 1620 with the founding of the Plymouth Colony. Other attempts at colonization took place throughout the 1620s, but expansion of English settlements only began on a large scale with the founding of the Massachusetts Bay Colony in 1628 and the arrival of the first large group of Puritan settlers in 1630. Over the next ten years, there was a major migration of Puritans to the area, leading to the founding of a number of new colonies in New England. By the 1680s, the number of New England colonies had stabilized at five: the Connecticut Colony, the Colony of Rhode Island and Providence Plantations, and the Province of New Hampshire all bordered the area surrounding Massachusetts Bay and Plymouth. Massachusetts Bay, however, was the most populous and economically significant, hosting a sizable merchant fleet.

The colonies had struggles with some of the Indigenous inhabitants. The Pequot tribe was virtually destroyed in the Pequot War during the 1630s, and King Philip's War in the 1670s decimated the Narragansetts in southern New England. King Philip's War was also very costly to the colonists of New England, putting a halt to expansion for several years.

Massachusetts and Plymouth were both somewhat politically independent from England in their early days, but this situation changed after the restoration of Charles II to the English throne in 1660. Charles sought closer oversight of the colonies, and he tried to introduce and enforce economic control over their activities. The Navigation Acts passed in the 1660s were widely disliked in Massachusetts, where merchants often found themselves trapped and at odds with the rules. Charles II also viewed Massachusetts' issuing of coins as a treasonous act. However, many colonial governments did not enforce the acts themselves, particularly Massachusetts, and tensions grew when Charles revoked the first Massachusetts Charter in 1684.

In 1686, Charles II's successor James II formed the Dominion of New England which ultimately created a single political unit out of the British territories from Delaware Bay to Penobscot Bay. Dominion governor Edmund Andros was highly unpopular in the colonies, but he was especially hated in Massachusetts where he angered virtually everyone by rigidly enforcing the Navigation Acts, vacating land titles, appropriating a Puritan meeting house as a site to host services for the Church of England, and restricting town meetings, among other sundry complaints. One of his final acts as governor was raiding a French baron's estate in Acadia, which precipitated King William's War. James was deposed in the 1688 Glorious Revolution, whereupon Massachusetts political leaders rose up against Andros, arresting him and other English authorities in April 1689. This led to the collapse of the Dominion, as the other colonies then quickly reasserted their old forms of government.

The Plymouth colony never had a royal charter, so its governance had always been on a somewhat precarious footing. The Massachusetts colonial government was re-established but it no longer had a valid charter, and some opponents of the old Puritan rule refused to pay taxes and engaged in other forms of protest. Provincial agents traveled to London where Increase Mather was representing the old colony leaders, and he petitioned William III and Mary II to restore the old colonial charter. The king refused, however, when he learned that this might result in a return to the religious rule. Instead, the Lords of Trade combined the colonies of Plymouth and Massachusetts Bay into the Province of Massachusetts Bay. They issued a charter for the Province on October 7, 1691, and appointed William Phips as its governor.

== Provincial charter ==
The new charter differed from the old one in several important ways. One of the principal changes was inaugurated over Mather's objection, changing the voting eligibility requirements from religious qualifications to land ownership. The effect of this change has been a subject of debate among historians, but there is significant consensus that it greatly enlarged the number of men eligible to vote. The new rules required prospective voters to own £40 worth of property or real estate that yielded at least £2 per year in rent; Benjamin Labaree estimates that this included about three-quarters of the adult male population at the time. The charter also guaranteed freedom of worship, but only for non-Catholic Christians.

The second major change was that senior officials of the government were appointed by the crown instead of being elected, including governor, lieutenant governor, and judges. The legislative assembly (or General Court) continued to be elected, however, and was responsible for choosing members of the Governor's Council. The governor had veto power over laws passed by the General Court, as well as over appointments to the council. These rules differed in important ways from the royal charters enjoyed by the other New England colonies. The most important were that the General Court now possessed the powers of appropriation, and that the council was locally chosen and not appointed by either the governor or the Crown. These significantly weakened the governor's power, which became important later in provincial history.

The province's territory was also greatly expanded. Beyond that administered by Massachusetts Bay and Plymouth colonies were added the Province of Maine (now western Maine), the Territory of Sagadahock (being administered as Cornwall County, Province of New York, now eastern Maine), Dukes County in the Province of New York (Nantucket, Martha's Vineyard, and the Elizabeth Islands), and Acadia (then encompassing Nova Scotia and New Brunswick). The province included the French territory of Acadia because it was created during King William's War. England returned the territory to France in the Treaty of Ryswick at the end of the war in 1697.

Notably, due to the petitions of Samuel Allen and the heirs of Robert Tufton Mason, the Province of New Hampshire was not re-combined with Massachusetts. After the fall of the Dominion in 1689, provincial leaders such as Richard Waldron had tried working towards reincorporation of New Hampshire into Massachusetts as it was before King Charles II separated it in 1679.

== Colonial era ==
In the aftermath of the revolt against Andros, colonial defenses had been withdrawn from the frontiers, which were then repeatedly raided by French and Indigenous forces from Canada and Acadia. Queen Anne's War broke out in 1702 and lasted until 1713. Massachusetts Governor Joseph Dudley organized the colonial defenses, and there were fewer raids than previously. Dudley also organized expeditions in 1704 and 1707 against Acadia, a haven for French privateers, and he requested support from London for more ambitious efforts against New France. In 1709, Massachusetts raised troops for an expedition against Canada that was called off; troops were again raised in 1710, when the Acadian capital of Port Royal was finally captured.

Because of these wars, the colony had issued paper currency whose value was constantly in decline, leading to financial crises. This led to proposals to create a bank that would issue notes backed by real estate, but Governor Dudley and his successor Samuel Shute both opposed the idea. Dudley, Shute, and later governors fruitlessly attempted to convince the general court to fix salaries for crown-appointed officials. The conflict over salary reached a peak during the brief administration of William Burnet. He held the provincial assembly in session for six months, relocating it twice, in an unsuccessful attempt to force the issue.

In the early 1720s, the Indigenous Abenaki people of northern New England resumed raiding frontier communities, encouraged by French intriguers but also concerned over English encroachment on their lands. This violence was eventually put down by Acting Governor William Dummer in Dummer's War, and many Abenakis retreated from northern New England into Canada after the conflict.

In the 1730s, Governor Jonathan Belcher disputed the power of the legislature to direct appropriations, vetoing bills that did not give him the freedom to disburse funds as he saw fit, and this meant that the provincial treasury was often empty. Belcher was, however, permitted by the Board of Trade to accept annual grants from the legislature in lieu of a fixed salary. The currency crisis flared up again during his administration, resulting in a revival of the land bank proposal which Belcher opposed. His opponents intrigued in London to have him removed and the bank was established, but its existence was short-lived, for an act of Parliament forcibly dissolved it. This turned a number of important colonists against crown and Parliament, including the father of American Revolutionary War political leader Samuel Adams.

The next 20 years were dominated by war. King George's War broke out in 1744, and Governor William Shirley rallied troops from around New England for an assault on the French fortress at Louisbourg which succeeded in 1745. Louisbourg was returned to France at the end of the war in 1748, however, much to the annoyance of New Englanders. Governor Shirley was relatively popular, in part because he managed to avoid or finesse the more contentious issues which his predecessors had raised. The French and Indian War broke out in 1754, and Shirley was raised to the highest military command by the death of General Edward Braddock in 1755. He was unable to manage the large-scale logistics that the war demanded, however, and was recalled in 1757. His successor Thomas Pownall oversaw the remainder of the war, which ended in 1760.

== American Revolution ==
The 1760s and early 1770s were marked by a rising tide of colonial frustration with London's policies and with the governors sent to implement and enforce them. Both Francis Bernard and Thomas Hutchinson, the last two nonmilitary governors, were widely disliked over issues large and small, notably Parliament's attempts to impose taxes on the colonies without representation. Hutchinson was a Massachusetts native who served for many years as lieutenant governor, yet he authorized quartering British Army troops in Boston, which eventually precipitated the Boston Massacre on March 5, 1770. By this time, Samuel Adams, Paul Revere, John Hancock, and others were actively opposing crown policies.

Parliament passed the Townshend Acts in 1767 and 1768, and the Massachusetts General Court authorized a circular letter denouncing them as unconstitutional. Royal Governor Francis Bernard demanded that the General Court rescind the letter but they refused, so he dissolved it, which led to widespread violence and rioting throughout Boston. Royal officers fled to Castle William and the Crown authorized more troops to be sent to Massachusetts. The Sons of Liberty stated that they were prepared to take up armed resistance to the Royal Authorities, while more conservative elements of society desired a peaceful political solution.

Boston citizens resolved at a town meeting to have the towns of Massachusetts assemble in a convention, and delegates met at Faneuil Hall for six days in September, with Thomas Cushing serving as chairman. Many Patriot leaders were calling for armed resistance by this time, but the more moderate factions of the convention won out and military action was voted down.

=== Boston Tea Party ===
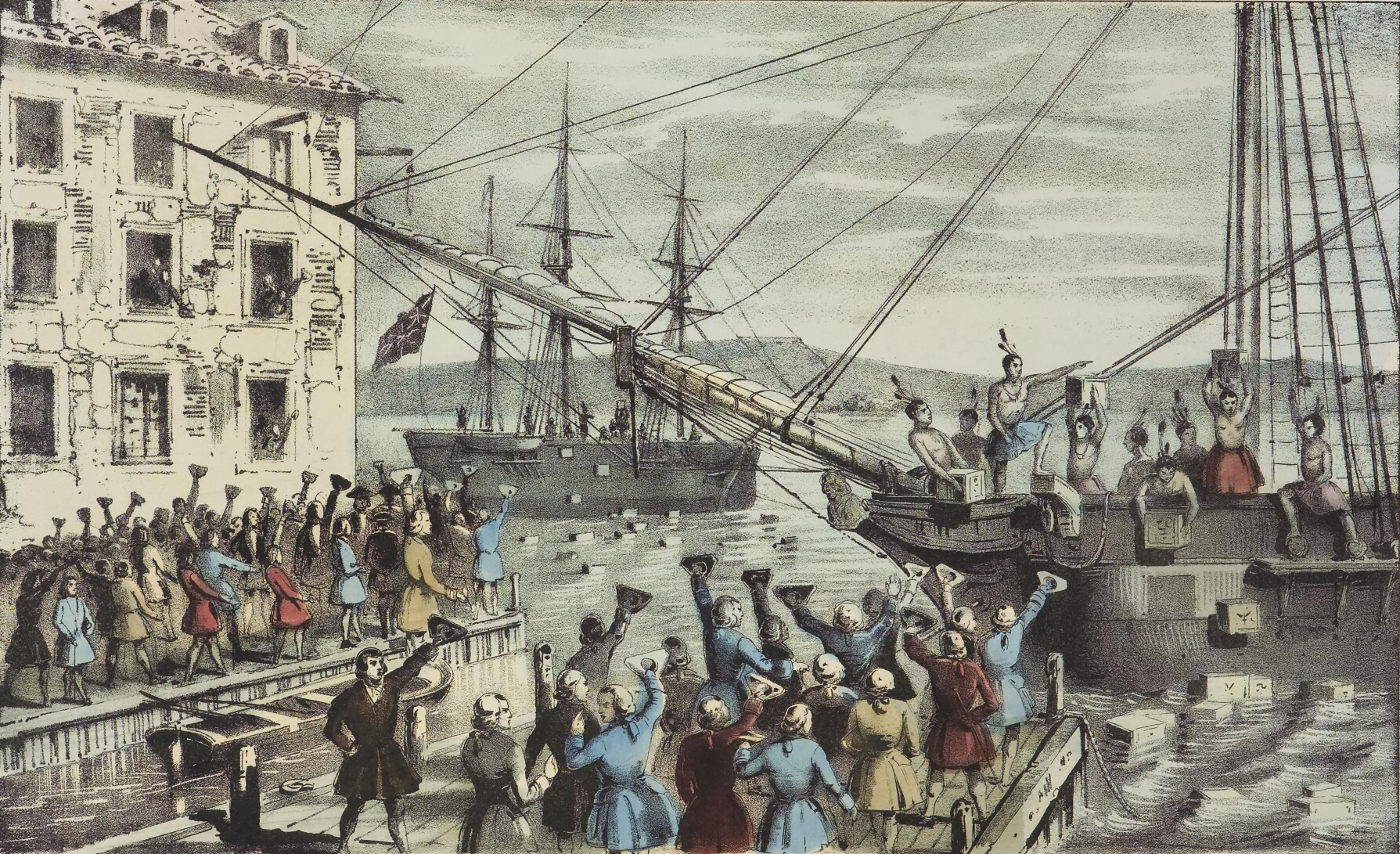
A 1773 lithograph of the Boston Tea Party

The Sons of Liberty organized a meeting at the Old South Meeting House in Boston in 1773 in defiance of the Tea Act; thousands of people attended, and Samuel Adams organized a protest at Boston Harbor. Colonists stormed ships in the harbor and dumped the cargo of tea into the water, and the protest came to be known as the Boston Tea Party. General Thomas Gage replaced Hutchinson as royal governor in May 1774. He was well received at first, but his reputation rapidly became worse with the Patriots as he began to implement the Intolerable Acts, which included the Massachusetts Government Act, dissolved the legislature, and closed the port of Boston until reparations were paid for the dumped tea. The port closure did great damage to the Massachusetts economy and led to a wave of sympathetic assistance from other colonies.

The Intolerable Acts only increased the crisis in New England, as Boston colonists insisted that their constitutional rights were being destroyed. The New England colonies had democratic control of their own governments, dating back to the founding of Plymouth Colony in 1620. The General Court lacked executive authority and authority over the militia, yet it still held significant power. The colonists had control over the treasury and spending and could pass laws. Anything passed by the assembly was subject to veto by the Royal Governor, but the General Court held control over spending and could withhold the pay of the Royal officials as leverage. This resulted in the Royal Governor being little more than a figurehead.

The royal government of the Province of Massachusetts Bay existed until early October 1774, when members of the General Court met in contravention of the Massachusetts Government Act and established the Massachusetts Provincial Congress, which became the de facto government. Governor Gage continued an essentially military authority in Boston, but the provincial congress governed the rest of Massachusetts.

=== American Revolutionary War ===
War finally erupted in April 1775 at Lexington and Concord, which started the American Revolutionary War and the Siege of Boston. The British evacuated Boston on March 17, 1776, ending the siege and bringing the city under Patriot control.

On May 1, 1776, citing open rebellion and lack of satisfaction of grievances, the General Assembly adopted a resolution changing the style of commissions and writs to be in the name of "The Government and People of Massachusetts Bay in New England" instead of in the name of the king, as was tradition. Henry Barton Dawson of the New York Historical society wrote in 1862 that this was a "Massachusetts Declaration of Independence", though that was not explicit in the text. Dawson admitted "I may have attributed a greater degree of importance to these instruments than they really merit".

In the United States Declaration of Independence on July 4, 1776, the Thirteen Colonies - including Massachusetts Bay - severed all ties with the United Kingdom.

=== Provincial Congress ===
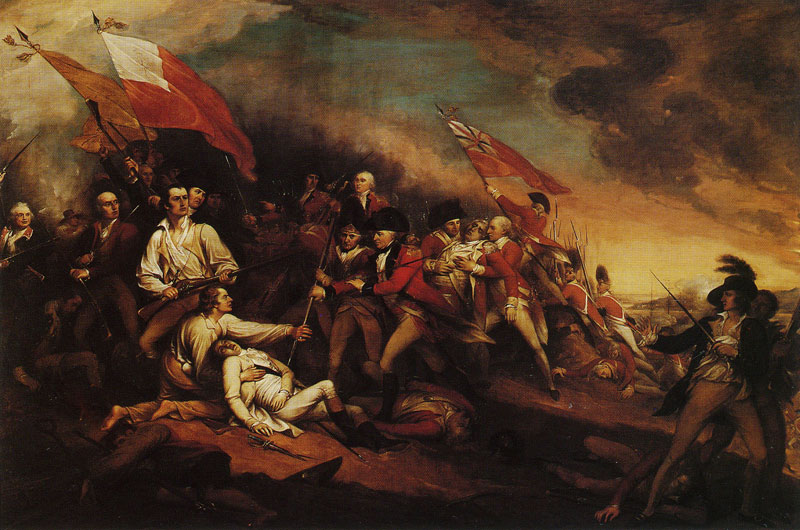
John Trumbull's 1834 portrait of Joseph Warren's death at the Battle of Bunker Hill

Passage of the Massachusetts Government Act resulted in the dissolution of the General Court, so the colonists held conventions throughout Massachusetts. These conventions were organized by county and had delegates from each town. Each convention drafted resolutions which were to be sent to the Royal Governor in Boston; these differed from county to county, yet they had many similar themes and sentiments. The delegates insisted on reinstatement of their constitutional government, which had existed since the Mayflower Compact of 1620 and was reiterated in the Charter of the Massachusetts Bay Company and the Massachusetts Charter. They declared their allegiance to King George III, but they stated that they would be absolved of that allegiance if he did not restore their constitutional rights and privileges. They declared that they would resist with force if those rights were not restored, and this included the total boycott of British goods, the disruption of local courts, and the kidnapping of royal officials.

Delegates from all the counties of Massachusetts met in Salem in October 1774 to reform their dissolved assembly. This new congress was to be the resumption of their constitutional government and a repudiation of the royal one in Boston. The congress selected John Hancock as its first president (then called chairman) and Benjamin Lincoln as clerk, and they installed judges, tax collectors, constables, and other officials. They also assumed control of the militia and instructed all towns in Massachusetts to train troops and elect new officers. An executive standing committee and a Committee of Safety were also instituted to govern when Congress was not in session.

The Provincial Congress went through different formations in its six years of existence, with shifting structures of authority and types of governance. The executive standing committee was replaced in the Second Congress with a renewed Committee of Safety which acted as the de facto governmental authority, in charge of the militia and governance in between sessions. The third Congress brought a return to legislative supremacy and a decrease in power of the executive. Joseph Warren was elected as the congress' second president and James Warren as its third.

=== Forming the Commonwealth ===
Calls for a constitutional convention began when the Provincial Congress was declared in 1774. With the pressures of the war and political uncertainty these efforts were postponed. Berkshire County in the far western part of Massachusetts Bay was exceptionally vocal in its desire to form a new constitution. In a dispatch to the Provincial Congress the delegates of Pittsfield rejected not only the royal colonial authorities but also the legitimacy of the previous charters with which the Provincial Congress claimed its legitimacy. The letter stated that the only political legitimacy a state or constitution could find would be with the people of a province. With Massachusetts Bay declaring independence from the Kingdom of Great Britain in May 1776 the push for a newly codified constitution increased.

In September 1776 the General Court petitioned the towns of Massachusetts Bay to put forth a vote on whether or not a convention should be called. In 1777 it was agreed that a convention would be formed to draft a new constitution. The General Court, which consisted of the Governor's Council and House of Representatives, decided to form a committee which would be tasked to write a constitution. In the winter of 1778 the General Court decided that the draft formulated from the constitutional committee would be put before the electorate of Massachusetts Bay and it would need to be accepted by 2/3rds of voters.

The first draft of the convention was rejected. In this first draft the state would consist of a legislature called the General Court which had two houses, a House of Representatives and an indirectly elected senate that would also serve as a governor's council. The Governor would not have the power of veto and would need to have any action confirmed by the Senate. There were some progressive elements of the constitution however, the Senate would be apportioned based on population and the House would no longer have a property requirement. Also a point of contention was that there was no Bill of Rights. When the vote was put before the populace it was rejected by an 83% to 17% margin.

In 1779 another question was put to the electorate. This time the people were asked if they favored another convention, apportioned by population, to meet and formulate a new draft of the constitution. The question passed by a 72% to 28% margin. This next convention met from September 1, 1779, to June 16, 1780. At the time the war was not going well for the Patriot forces. The Penobscot Expedition had ended in failure, and the Kingdom of France had yet to send its larger contingent of military support. Even amidst the political uncertainty the convention was assembled with 312 members.

John Adams wrote the draft of the new constitution and the convention accepted it with minimal amendments. The draft was then put to the various town meetings of the province. The town meetings were to decide on the constitution in pieces, rather than as a whole, and add any changes they thought were necessary. The Adams version was then accepted by the convention on June 15, 1780. In elections held in October 1780, John Hancock was elected the first Governor of Massachusetts along with representatives to the commonwealth's first General Court.

== Politics ==
=== Provincial politics ===
The politics of the province were dominated by three major factions, according to Thomas Hutchinson, who wrote the first major history of colonial Massachusetts. This is in distinction to most of the other colonies, where there were two factions. Expansionists believed strongly in the growth of the colony and in a vigorous defense against French and Indian incursions; they were exemplified in Massachusetts by people such as Thomas Hancock, uncle to John Hancock, and James Otis, Sr. This faction became a vital force in the Patriot movements preceding the revolution. Nonexpansionists were more circumspect, preferring to rely on a strong relationship with the mother country; they were exemplified by Hutchinson and the Oliver family of Boston. This faction became the Loyalists in the revolutionary era.

The third force in Massachusetts politics was a populist faction made possible by the structure of the provincial legislature, in which rural and lower class communities held a larger number of votes than in other provinces. Its early leaders included the Cookes (Elisha Senior and Junior) of Maine, while later leaders included revolutionary firebrand Samuel Adams. Religion did not play a major role in these divisions, although nonexpansionists tended to be Anglican while expansionists were mainly middle-of-the road Congregationalist. Populists generally held either conservative Puritan views or the revivalist views of the First Great Awakening. Throughout the provincial history, these factions made and broke alliances as conditions and circumstances dictated.

The populist faction had concerns that sometimes prompted it to support one of the other parties. Its rural character meant that they sided with the expansionists when there were troubles on the frontier. They also tended to side with the expansionists on the recurring problems with the local money, whose inflation tended to favor their ability to repay debts in depreciated currency. These ties became stronger in the 1760s as the conflict grew with Parliament.

The nonexpansionists were composed principally of a wealthy merchant class in Boston. They had allies in the wealthy farming communities in the more developed eastern portions of the province, and in the province's major ports. These alliances often rivaled the populist party in power in the provincial legislature. They favored stronger regulation from the mother country and opposed the inflationist issuance of colonial currency.

Expansionists mainly came from two disparate groups. The first was a portion of the eastern merchant class, represented by the Hancocks and Otises, who harbored views of the growth of the colony and held relatively liberal religious views. They were joined by wealthy landowners in the Connecticut River valley, whose needs for defense and growth were directly tied to property development. These two groups agreed on defense and an expansionist vision, although they disagreed on the currency issue; the westerners sided with the nonexpansionists in their desire for a standards-based currency.

=== Local politics ===
The province significantly expanded its geographical reach, principally in the 18th century. There were 83 towns in 1695; this had grown to 186 by 1765. Most of the towns in 1695 were within one day's travel of Boston, but this changed as townships sprang up in Worcester County and the Berkshires on land that had been under Indian control prior to King Philip's War.

The character of local politics changed as the province prospered and grew. Unity of community during the earlier colonial period gave way to subdivision of larger towns. Dedham, for example, was split into six towns, and Newburyport was separated from Newbury in 1764.

Town meetings also became more important in local political life. As towns grew, the townspeople became more assertive in managing their affairs. Town selectmen had previously wielded significant power, but they lost some of their influence to the town meetings and to the appointment of paid town employees, such as tax assessors, constables, and treasurers.

== Geography ==
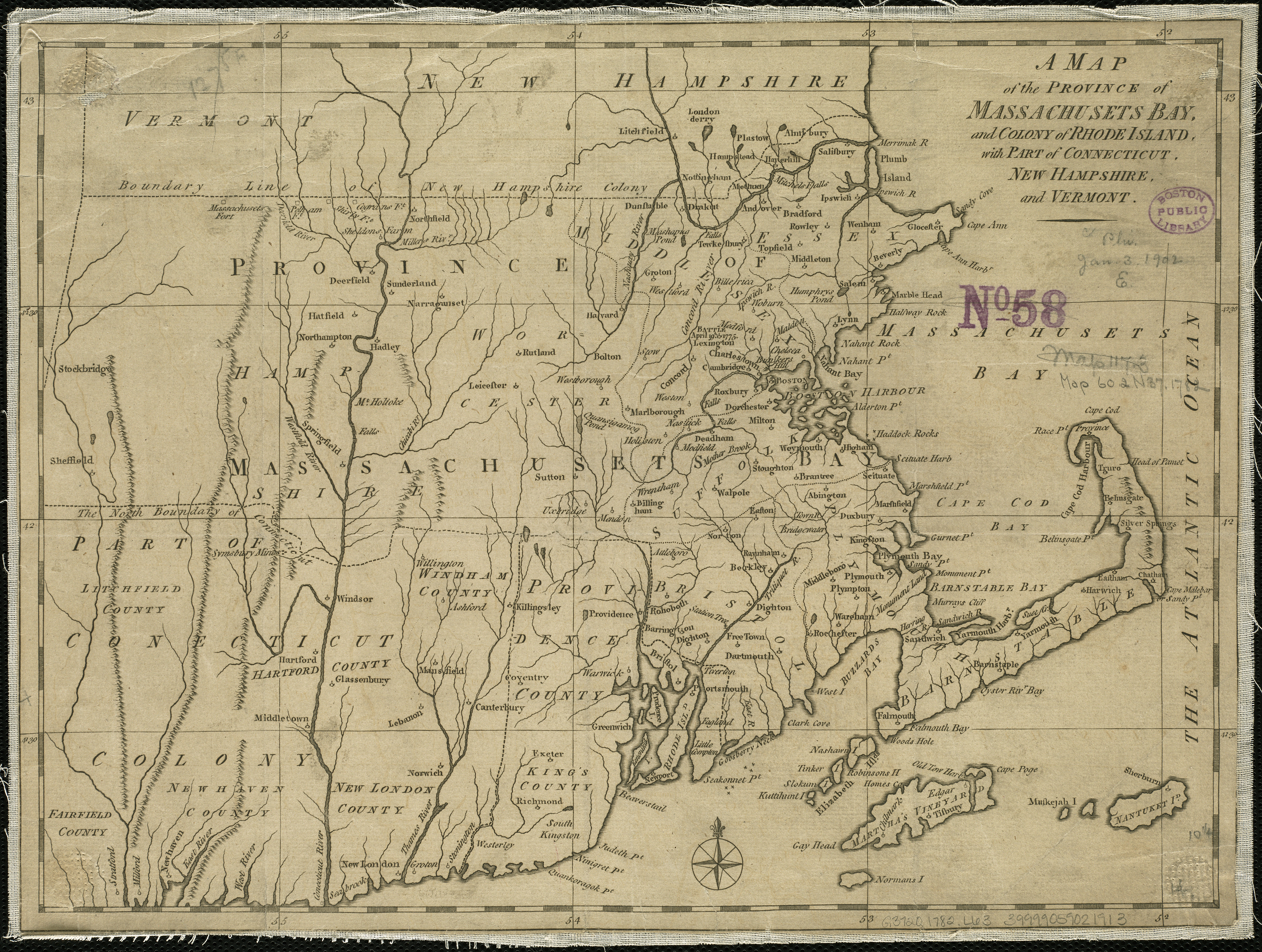
Map of the province of Massachusetts Bay and Colony of Rhode Island, 1782

The boundaries of the province changed in both major and minor ways during its existence. There was very thin soil land, and a rocky terrain. Nova Scotia, then including New Brunswick, was occupied by English forces at the time of the charter's issuance, but was separated in 1697 when the territory, called Acadia by the French, was formally returned to France by the 1697 Treaty of Ryswick. Nova Scotia became a separate province in 1710, following the British conquest of Acadia in Queen Anne's War. Maine was not separated until after American independence, when it attained statehood in 1820.

The borders of the province with the neighboring provinces underwent some adjustment. Its principal predecessor colonies, Massachusetts Bay and Plymouth, had established boundaries with New Hampshire, Rhode Island, and Connecticut, but these underwent changes during the provincial period. The boundary with New Hampshire was of some controversy, since the original boundary definition in colonial charters (three miles north of the Merrimack River) had been made on the assumption that the river flowed predominantly west. This issue was resolved by King George II in 1741, when he ruled that the border between the two provinces follows what is now the border between the two states.

Surveys in the 1690s suggested that the original boundary line with Connecticut and Rhode Island had been incorrectly surveyed. In the early 18th century joint surveys determined that the line was south of where it should be. In 1713 Massachusetts set aside a plot of land (called the "Equivalent Lands") to compensate Connecticut for this error. These lands were auctioned off, and the proceeds were used by Connecticut to fund Yale College. The boundary with Rhode Island was also found to require adjustment, and in 1746 territories on the eastern shore of Narragansett Bay (present-day Barrington, Bristol, Tiverton and Little Compton) were ceded to Rhode Island. The borders between Massachusetts and its southern neighbors were not fixed into their modern form until the 19th century, requiring significant legal action in the case of the Rhode Island borders. The western border with New York was agreed in 1773, but not surveyed until 1788.

The province of Massachusetts Bay also laid a claim to what is now Western New York as part of the province's sea-to-sea grant. The 1780s Treaty of Hartford saw Massachusetts relinquish that claim in exchange for the right to sell it off to developers.

== See also ==
- American Revolution
- History of Massachusetts
- Historical outline of Massachusetts
- List of colonial governors of Massachusetts
