= Charter of the Massachusetts Bay Company =

1628 English royal charter

The Charter granted to the Company of Massachusetts Bay in New England
- Royal Arms of Charles I of England
- Type: Royal charter, land grant, joint-stock company
- Context: British colonization of the Americas; Puritan migration to New England (1620-1640)
- Signed: March 4, 1628
- Location: Westminster
- Expiration: 1684
- Signatories: Privy Council of England
- Parties: Massachusetts Bay Company; Kingdom of England
- Language: English

The Charter of the Massachusetts Bay Company was an English royal charter which formally incorporated the joint-stock company for the colonization of Massachusetts Bay. The charter, granted by Charles I of England in 1628, defined the regulations of the company, the land it would be granted, as well as the rights and privileges of the colonists.

== History ==
After the failure of the Dorchester Company in founding a settlement on Cape Ann, the settlers and shareholders of the company wished to form another colonial settlement, this time further south.

The colony was to be settled between the Charles River and the Merrimack River in New England. The Massachusetts Bay Company, like other colonial joint-stock companies, was to be a corporate entity as well as a governmental one. The first settlers of the colony were Puritans who sought to create a society based on their religious beliefs unfettered from the Royal Anglican government of the Kingdom of England. The settlers were to be shareholders, with all those wishing to emigrate to New England required to buy shares. This agreement was formulated in Cambridge and came to be known as the Cambridge Agreement.

Unlike other colonial companies whose presiding members resided and met in England, the governors and other colonial officials moved to New England as well. The government consisted of a Governor, Deputy Governor, a council of assistants who would provide legal counsel and jurisprudence, and a General Court of delegates elected from each town.

Voting rights in the colony were to be for only men of the Puritan church. Once settled in what is now Boston, the delegates formed a quasi-democratic and theocratic state based on the Laws of Moses.

As Puritan Studies scholar Abram Van Engen has noted, this charter "is one of the most important, underexamined, and least-taught texts in the Puritan literary canon."

The charter served as the constitution of the colony. It was revoked by an English court in 1684, but continued to serve as a de facto constitution until the creation of the Dominion of New England in 1686. Following the 1689 Boston revolt and collapse of the dominion, it again served as the governing document until the issuance of the royal charter for the Province of Massachusetts Bay in 1692.

== See also ==
- Massachusetts Charter
- Mayflower Compact
- Massachusetts Body of Liberties
