= Massachusetts Constitutional Convention of 1779–1780 =

The Constitutional Convention of 1779–1780 was the second constitutional convention held in Massachusetts to draft a new state constitution following the state's declaration of independence in 1776. The convention that drafted the proposed constitution was composed of delegates specifically elected for the purpose, unlike the previous year's convention, which had been composed of legislators. The convention's proposal was principally drafted by John Adams, and was published in early March 1780. After an extended process of ratification debates involving town meetings, the convention approved a modified version of the March proposal on June 15, 1780, although the vote to do so was not without some controversy. The new Massachusetts State Constitution then went into effect, and the convention on June 16 issued a call to elect a governor and General Court under its terms before it finally adjourned.

The state constitution adopted by the convention provided no mechanisms for amendment other than the calling of another convention. This was changed by the next constitutional convention, held in 1820 after the separation of Maine from the state precipitated a constitutional crisis. That convention ratified the constitution's first nine amendments.

A 1916 investigation by Harvard historian Samuel Eliot Morison found that vote totals had been manufactured, and that the Constitution had not in fact been ratified by the required two thirds of voters.

== Members of the Convention ==
Members of the Convention include Jason Haven and John Sprague, both of Dedham. John Adams and John Bacon were also members. Brigadier-General Ebenezer Learned served as Chairman.
