= Constitution of Massachusetts =

American state constitution

Constitution of the Commonwealth of Massachusetts
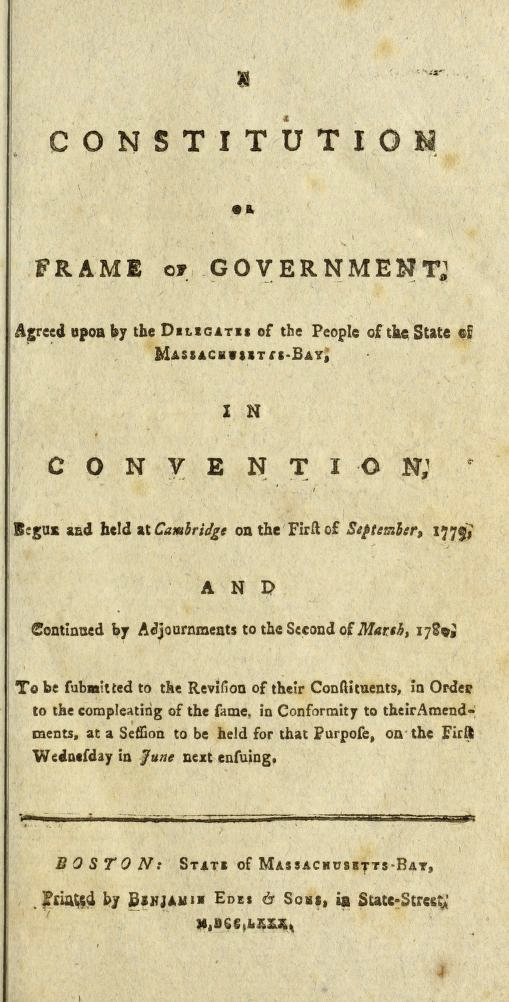
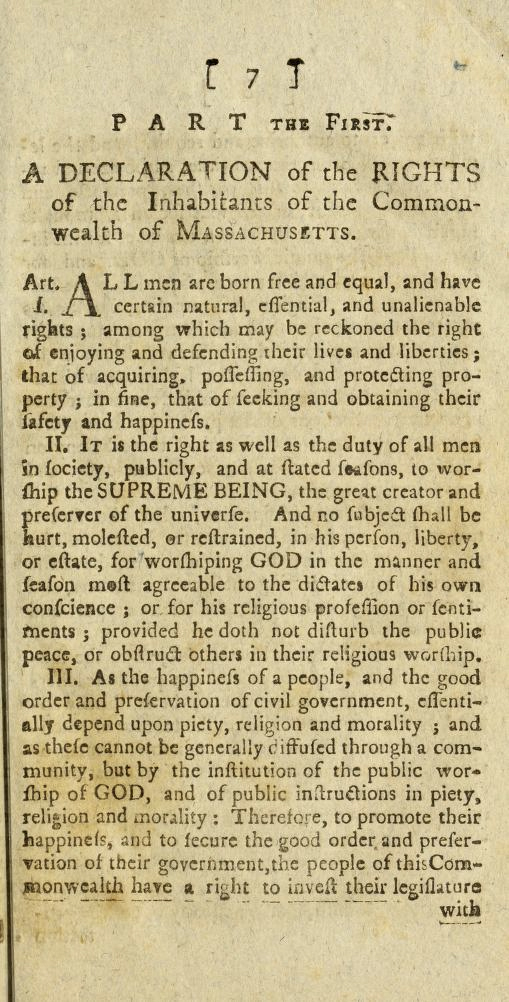
- The title page and first articles, the Declaration of Rights, in the first published edition of the 1780 Constitution

Overview
- Jurisdiction: Commonwealth of Massachusetts
- Subordinate to: Constitution of the United States
- Created: October 30, 1779
- Presented: June 15, 1780
- Ratified: October 25, 1780
- System: Single executive

Government structure
- Branches: 3
- Chambers: Two (Massachusetts General Court): Massachusetts Senate; Massachusetts House of Representatives
- Executive: Governor of Massachusetts
- Judiciary: Supreme, Appeals, Trial

History
- First legislature: October 25, 1780
- First executive: October 25, 1780
- First court: October 25, 1780
- Amendments: 121
- Last amended: November 8, 2022
- Commissioned by: Massachusetts Provincial Congress
- Author: John Adams
- Supersedes: Massachusetts Charter

Full text
- Constitution of the Commonwealth of Massachusetts (1780) at Wikisource

The Constitution of the Commonwealth of Massachusetts is the fundamental governing document of the Commonwealth of Massachusetts, one of the 50 individual states that make up the United States of America. It consists of a preamble, declaration of rights, description of the principles and framework of government, and articles of amendment.

Created by the Massachusetts Constitutional Convention of 1779, the document was primarily authored by American founding father and future president John Adams. Following its approval by convention delegates, it was approved by voters on June 15, 1780, and became effective October 25 of the same year.

The Massachusetts Constitution was unique in being structured with chapters, sections and articles, as opposed to being a list of provisions. It served as a model for the U.S. Constitution, drafted seven years later, both structurally and substantively, and also influenced later revisions of many other state constitutions. Although the Constitution did not expressly prohibit slavery, its declaration of rights was interpreted by the courts to effectively banish the practice of enslavement in the Commonwealth by 1783, only three years after its adoption.

The Massachusetts Constitution is among the oldest functioning written constitutions in continuous effect in the world, predated only by sections of the Constitution of San Marino and Magna Carta. It was also the first constitution in history to be created by a convention called for that purpose, rather than by a legislative body.

It has been amended 121 times as of 2026.

== History ==
In the spring of 1775, Adams took the position that each state should call a special convention to write a constitution and then submit it to a popular vote. He told the Continental Congress that:

We must realize the theories of the Wisest Writers and invite the People, to erect the whole Building with their own hands upon the broadest foundation. That this could be done only by conventions of representatives chosen by the People. ... Congress ought now to recommend to the People of every Colony to call such Conventions immediately and set up Governments of their own, under their own Authority; for the People were the Source of all Authority and the Original of all Power.

The legislative body of Massachusetts, known as the Massachusetts General Court, instead drafted its own version of a constitution and submitted it to the voters, who rejected it in 1778. That version did not provide for the separation of powers, nor did it include a statement of individual rights. The General Court then organized the election of delegates from each town to participate in a convention that would draft a constitution and submit their work to a popular vote with the understanding that its adoption would require approval by two-thirds of the voters. The constitutional convention met in Cambridge in September 1779.

The convention sat from September 1 to October 30, 1779. Its 312 members chose a committee of thirty members to prepare a new constitution and declaration of rights. That committee asked Adams to draft a declaration of rights. It appointed a subcommittee of James Bowdoin, Samuel Adams, and John Adams to draft the constitution and that trio delegated the drafting to John Adams alone. He later wrote that he constituted a "sub-sub committee of one". An article on religion was referred to members of the clergy, which resulted in a form of religious establishment entirely unlike that later adopted at the federal level. Adams advocated for an end to that establishment when revisions to the constitution were considered in 1820, and his views were adopted in 1832.

Adams's draft declaration of rights read in part: "All men are born equally free and independent ..." Before being adopted by the constitutional convention it was revised to read: "All men are born free and equal ..." At the insistence of Adams, the document referred to the state as a "commonwealth".

Male voters 21 years or older ratified the constitution and declaration of rights at the convention on June 15, 1780, and it became effective on October 25, 1780.

== Preamble ==
The preamble of the constitution provided a model that was drawn on when the United States Constitution was composed a few years later, including some phrases near the end. It reads:

The end of the institution, maintenance, and administration of government, is to secure the existence of the body politic, to protect it, and to furnish the individuals who compose it with the power of enjoying in safety and tranquillity their natural rights, and the blessings of life: and whenever these great objects are not obtained, the people have a right to alter the government, and to take measures necessary for their safety, prosperity and happiness.

The body politic is formed by a voluntary association of individuals: it is a social compact, by which the whole people covenants with each citizen, and each citizen with the whole people, that all shall be governed by certain laws for the common good. It is the duty of the people, therefore, in framing a constitution of government, to provide for an equitable mode of making laws, as well as for an impartial interpretation, and a faithful execution of them; that every man may, at all times, find his security in them.

We, therefore, the people of Massachusetts, acknowledging, with grateful hearts, the goodness of the great Legislator of the universe, in affording us, in the course of His providence, an opportunity, deliberately and peaceably, without fraud, violence or surprise, of entering into an original, explicit, and solemn compact with each other; and of forming a new constitution of civil government, for ourselves and posterity; and devoutly imploring His direction in so interesting a design, do agree upon, ordain and establish the following Declaration of Rights, and Frame of Government, as the Constitution of the Commonwealth of Massachusetts.

== Declaration of Rights ==
"Part the First: A Declaration of the Rights of the Inhabitants of the Commonwealth of Massachusetts" consists of thirty articles. The first states:

Article I. All men are born free and equal and have certain natural, essential, and unalienable rights; among which may be reckoned the right of enjoying and defending their lives and liberties; that of acquiring, possessing, and protecting property; in fine, that of seeking and obtaining their safety and happiness.

This article was the subject of a landmark case in 1781 before a Massachusetts court sitting in Great Barrington, Brom and Bett v. Ashley. Elizabeth Freeman (whose slave name was "Bett"), a black slave owned by Colonel John Ashley, sued for her freedom based on this article. The jury agreed that slavery was inconsistent with the Massachusetts Constitution and awarded Freeman £5 in damages and her freedom. A few years later, Quock Walker, a black slave, sued his master for false imprisonment; the jury found for Walker and awarded him damages of £50. His master was then subject to criminal prosecution for assault and battery against Walker and was found guilty by a jury, which imposed a fine of 40/- (£2). In this manner, slavery lost any legal protection in Massachusetts, making it a tortious act under the law, effectively abolishing it within the Commonwealth.

In 1976 by amendment Article CVI, this article was amended to change the word "men" to "people". That amendment also added an additional sentence: "Equality under the law shall not be denied or abridged because of sex, race, color, creed or national origin."

This article was also the basis for the 2003 Supreme Judicial Court's ruling in Goodridge v. Department of Public Health required the Commonwealth to extend marriage rights to same-sex couples on an equal basis with different-sex couples.

The next several Articles within the "Part the First" in the original 1780 Constitution of Massachusetts called upon the people of the Commonwealth as being their "right as well as the duty of all men" (Article II) to a strong religious conviction and belief.

Article II. It is the right as well as the duty of all men in society, publicly and at stated seasons, to worship the Supreme Being, the great Creator, and Preserver of the universe. And no subject shall be hurt, molested, or restrained, in his person, liberty, or estate, for worshipping God in the manner and season most agreeable to the dictates of his conscience, or for his religious profession or sentiments, provided he doth not disturb the public peace or obstruct others in their religious worship.

Article III continued by noting that "the happiness of a people" and "preservation of civil government" is explicitly tied to religion and morality. This article established the possibility of "town religions" by allowing the state legislature, though Massachusetts cannot declare or recognize a state religion, to require towns to pay for the upkeep of a Protestant church out of local tax funds, with the town to determine by majority vote the denomination it would support as its parish church.

From 1780 to 1824 these democratically selected parish churches were considered the only churches with full legal rights, as "voluntary" churches ran against the Federalist ideal of a commonwealth. Until 1822 all residents of a town were required to belong to the parish church. In that year they were allowed to attend a neighboring town's church instead, and in 1824 full religious freedom was granted. However, the parishes remained beneficiaries of local taxes and were unable to expel dissident parishioners, since as residents they were members of the parish until they declared otherwise. Soon both dissident churches and the majority Congregational Church increasingly recognized that this system was contrary to the voluntary nature of religious worship. This section of the constitution was amended by bipartisan consensus in 1834 at the same time that several blue laws were repealed.

Article III. As the happiness of a people and the good order and preservation of civil government essentially depend upon piety, religion, and morality, and as these cannot be generally diffused through a community but by the institution of the public worship of God and of the public instructions in piety, religion, and morality: Therefore, To promote their happiness and to secure the good order and preservation of their government, the people of this commonwealth have a right to invest their legislature with power to authorize and require, and the legislature shall, from time to time, authorize and require, the several towns, parishes, precincts, and other bodies-politic or religious societies to make suitable provision, at their own expense, for the institution of the public worship of God and for the support and maintenance of public Protestant teachers of piety, religion, and morality in all cases where such provision shall not be made voluntarily.

And the people of this commonwealth have also a right to and do, invest their legislature with authority to enjoin upon all the subject an attendance upon the instructions of the public teachers aforesaid, at stated times and seasons, if there be any on whose instructions they can conscientiously and conveniently attend.

Provided, notwithstanding, That the several towns, parishes, precincts, and other bodies-politic, or religious societies, shall at all times have the exclusive right and electing their public teachers and of contracting with them for their support and maintenance.

And all moneys paid by the subject to the support of public worship and of public teachers aforesaid shall if he require it, be uniformly applied to the support of the public teacher or teachers of his religious sect or denomination, provided there be any on whose instructions he attends; otherwise it may be paid toward the support of the teacher or teachers of the parish or precinct in which the said sums of money are raised.

And every denomination of Christians, demeaning themselves peaceably and as good subjects of the commonwealth, shall be equally under the protection of the law; and no subordination of any sect or denomination to another shall ever be established by law.

== Frame of Government ==
Part II, Chapter I, Section I

The opening of the "Part the Second" lays down the official name of the State of Massachusetts.

The people, inhabiting the territory formerly called the Province of Massachusetts Bay, do hereby solemnly and mutually agree with each other, to form themselves into a free, sovereign, and independent body politic, or state by the name of THE COMMONWEALTH OF MASSACHUSETTS.

The first three articles in Chapter I, Section I, of the Massachusetts Constitution establishes the three primary branches of government; an executive, a bicameral legislature, and an independent judiciary. The design of this system, unique at the time, was created to ensure the proper separation of power between the different entities. The framers of the state constitution intended by this means to prevent the abuse of power by any one branch.

Article I. The department of legislation shall be formed by two branches, a Senate and House of Representatives: each of which shall have a negative on the other.

Article II. No bill or resolve of the senate or house of representatives shall become a law, and have force as such, until it shall have been laid before the governor for his revisal...

Article III. The general court shall forever have full power and authority to erect and constitute judicatories and courts of record, or other courts, to be held in the name of the commonwealth...

=== Removal – impeachment ===
Massachusetts allows impeachment of government officials through the legislature. They can also disqualify convicted officials from ever holding any place within the commonwealth.

== Articles of Amendment ==
There are 121 Articles of Amendment that have been added to the Massachusetts Constitution. The most recent one places a 4% marginal tax on income over $1,000,000 and was approved by a vote of 52% to 48% in 2022.

The amendment process is governed by the 48th Article of Amendment to the Constitution, which establishes an indirect initiative process that requires action by the state legislature, followed by a referendum.

For an amendment to be placed before the voters as a referendum, a state constitutional convention, a joint meeting of both houses of the legislature sitting as one body, in each of two successive two-year legislative sessions, must provide the required number of votes, which varies according to how the proposed amendment comes before the convention.

If it is a legislative amendment proposed by a legislator, the threshold is 50% of the members. If it is an initiative amendment put forward by petition, the threshold is 25% of the members. In both cases, the calculation of the votes is based on the number of seats in the constitutional convention, not the members present or seated.

The number of certified signatures required on the petitions is 3% of the total vote cast for all candidates for governor (excluding blanks) at the immediately preceding state election.

== Constitutional conventions ==
The state has held four constitutional conventions of elected delegates (as opposed to those that are special sessions of the legislature):

- Massachusetts Constitutional Convention of 1779–1780, drew up the original document
- Massachusetts Constitutional Convention of 1820–1821, submitted a number of articles to a popular vote, resulting in the adoption of the first nine amendments and the rejection of a number of other proposals
- Massachusetts Constitutional Convention of 1853
- Massachusetts Constitutional Convention of 1917–1919

== See also ==
- Mayflower Compact (1620)
- Massachusetts Charter
- Charter of the Massachusetts Bay Company
- Initiative petition, the Bay State's specific legal term for a public method for Massachusetts residents to affect Constitutional law, for example, Proposition 2½
- Massachusetts Body of Liberties (1641)
- Instrument of Government (1653)
- Law of Massachusetts
- State constitution (United States)
