= List of members of the colonial Massachusetts House of Representatives =

This is a list of members of the Massachusetts House of Representatives during the colonial era. For members of the Massachusetts House after the ratification of the Massachusetts Constitution in 1780, see Category:Members of the Massachusetts House of Representatives.

== A ==
- John Adams
- Samuel Adams
- Isaac Addington
- Humphrey Atherton
- Peter Atherton

== B ==
- Simon Bradstreet
- William Brattle
- William Bond (Massachusetts politician)
- James Bowdoin
- Nathaniel Byfield

== C ==
- John Chandler (sheriff)
- John Cogswell
- James Converse
- Elisha Cooke Sr.
- Elisha Cooke Jr.
- George Cooke (Massachusetts politician)
- Jonathan Corwin
- Thomas Cushing
- Thomas Cushing II
- John Cutt

== D ==
- Tristram Dalton
- Richard Dana (lawyer)
- Thomas Danforth
- Daniel Denison
- Thomas Drury (1668)
- Joseph Dwight

== E ==
- Joseph Ellis Jr.

== F ==
- William Fairfield (Massachusetts politician)
- Anthony Fisher (Massachusetts politician)
- Daniel Fisher
- Joshua Fisher (Massachusetts politician)

== G ==
- Daniel Gookin
- Nathaniel Gorham
- Stephen Greenleaf
- Jeremiah Gridley
- John Grout

== H ==
- Robert Hale (doctor)
- John Hancock
- Thomas Hastings (colonist)
- William Hathorne
- Joseph Hawley (Massachusetts politician)
- Joseph Hills (Massachusetts)
- Christopher Hussey (died 1686)
- Thomas Hutchinson (governor)

== J ==
- Nehemiah Jewett

== L ==
- John Leavitt
- John Leverett
- Benjamin Lincoln
- Samuel Livermore (1768–1769)

== M ==
- Richard Martyn

== O ==
- Thomas Oakes (representative)
- Andrew Oliver
- Azor Orne
- James Otis Sr.
- James Otis Jr.

== P ==
- Robert Treat Paine
- Joseph Parsons Jr.
- William Pepperell
- William Phillips Sr.

== Q ==
- Edmund Quincy (1628-1698)
- John Quincy

== R ==
- Edmund Rice (colonist)
- Thomas Rice (1654)
- Thomas Rice (1734)
- John Richards
- John Rowe (merchant)
- Timothy Ruggles
- Isaac Royall Jr.

== S ==
- John Saffin
- Thomas Savage
- Robert Sedgwick
- Joseph Sherman (Massachusetts Bay Colony)

== T ==
- Josiah Taft

== W ==
- Richard Waldron
- Samuel White (Massachusetts politician)

== See also ==
- Massachusetts Charter
- Boston Board of Selectmen
- List of colonial governors of Massachusetts
