= Thomas Oakes =

Thomas Oakes may refer to:

- Thomas Oakes (engineer) (died 1823), Chief Engineer of the Schuylkill Navigation Company in the early 19th century
- Thomas Oakes (footballer) (1874–?), English footballer of the 1890s
- Thomas Oakes (representative) (1644–1719), Speaker of the Massachusetts House of Representatives from 1705 to 1706
- Thomas Fletcher Oakes (1843–1919), President of the Northern Pacific Railroad in the late 19th century
