= Atherton Trading Company =

The Atherton Trading Company also known as the Atherton Syndicate was formed in 1659; with Humphrey Atherton and John Winthrop the Younger, Governor of Connecticut at the helm. This partnership of merchants and investors included Simon Bradstreet, Daniel Denison, Elisha Hutchinson, Richard Smith, Thomas Smith and Boston traders; John Tinker, Amos Richardson and William Hudson. Edward Hutchinson joined and by 1661, Plymouth investors included Josiah Winslow, John Brown and Thomas Willet. Their land speculation in the Narragansett area of Rhode Island was at the expense of the Native American inhabitants.

Critics from the Colony of Rhode Island alleged that Humphrey Atherton had kept one signatory, the younger brother of Narragansett Indian sachem Pessicus (also known as Maussup), drunk for several days and took him to Boston in order to secure Atherton’s and his partners perceived "rights" to the land at little expense.

The company obtained a large tract of land north of Kingston, 5,000 acres (2,000 ha) of land on Boston Neck, above Wickford. The Commissioners of the New England Confederation were opposed to the dissenters in Rhode Island, and colluded with the Atherton Trading Company by imposing a heavy fine on the Niantic for an infraction by certain members of their tribe. This event became known as the Atherton Purchase.

“Atherton played a key role in fighting and removing Indians from land he later owned”

The company acquired title after the Native American inhabitants defaulted on the loan. The purchase violated the jurisdiction of Rhode Island.

In 1660, commissioners of the New England Confederation, of whom John Winthrop, Jr. was one, transferred ownership of the mortgage of Pessicus's land to the Atherton Trading Company for 735 fathoms of Wampum. The company then foreclosed on the mortgage. The land included the Narragansett property within the bounds of the Colony of Rhode Island. Rhode Island found this transference of land to be illegal and prevented the resale for several years.

The list of proprietors dated Oct 13, 1660 also included Thomas Willett, later to be the first Mayor of New York City. The conflicting purchase claims were settled in 1679, after Humphrey Atherton’s death. His son Jonathan Atherton pushed the case on October 8, 1674 for continued support from the Connecticut Colony, seeking mutual interest to reassure the company’s rights to the land if the Connecticut Colony bolstered their claim to land to the east of Stonington, Connecticut. Jonathan Atherton sold his shares in 1676 to John Saffin and Thomas Dean and all his rights to Narragansett Neck.

The company, which by then had changed its name to "Proprietors of the Narragansett Country," eventually did sell 5,000 acres (20 km^{2}) of the land to Huguenot immigrants who began a colony there called Frenchtown. The Huguenots lost the land when, in 1688, a Royal Commission determined the Atherton claim to be illegal. However the dispute remained ongoing in 1708.

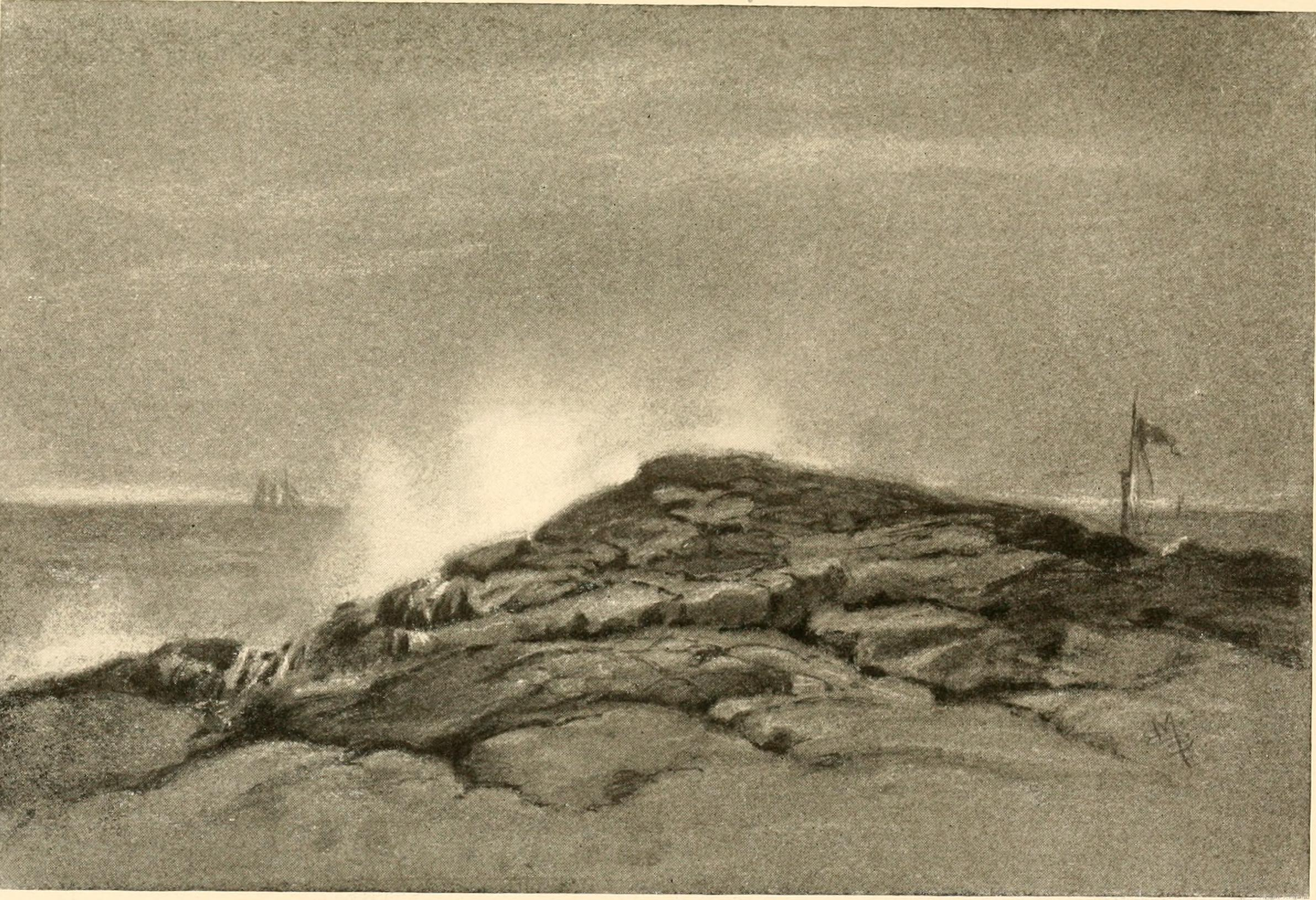
An illustration of Narragansett Bay published in 1904. Miss Caroline Hazard referred to the Atherton Trading Company as speculation enterprise of absentee landlords

== Neighboring land speculation ==
John Hull, along with other Boston Merchants acquired a land grant in 1657, south of Wickford, known as the Pettaquamscutt Purchase, (later South Kingstown) from the Indian sachems in 1657. Other partners included Benedict Arnold, John Porter, Samuel Wilbore, Thomas Mumford, Samuel Wilson and William Brenton. This preceded the Atherton Trading Company. It too was declared illegal by the Royal Commission of 1688.

Some documents refer to there being an overlap with the two claims.
