= Francis Brinley =

English-born landowner, philanthropist and militia officer (1690–1765)

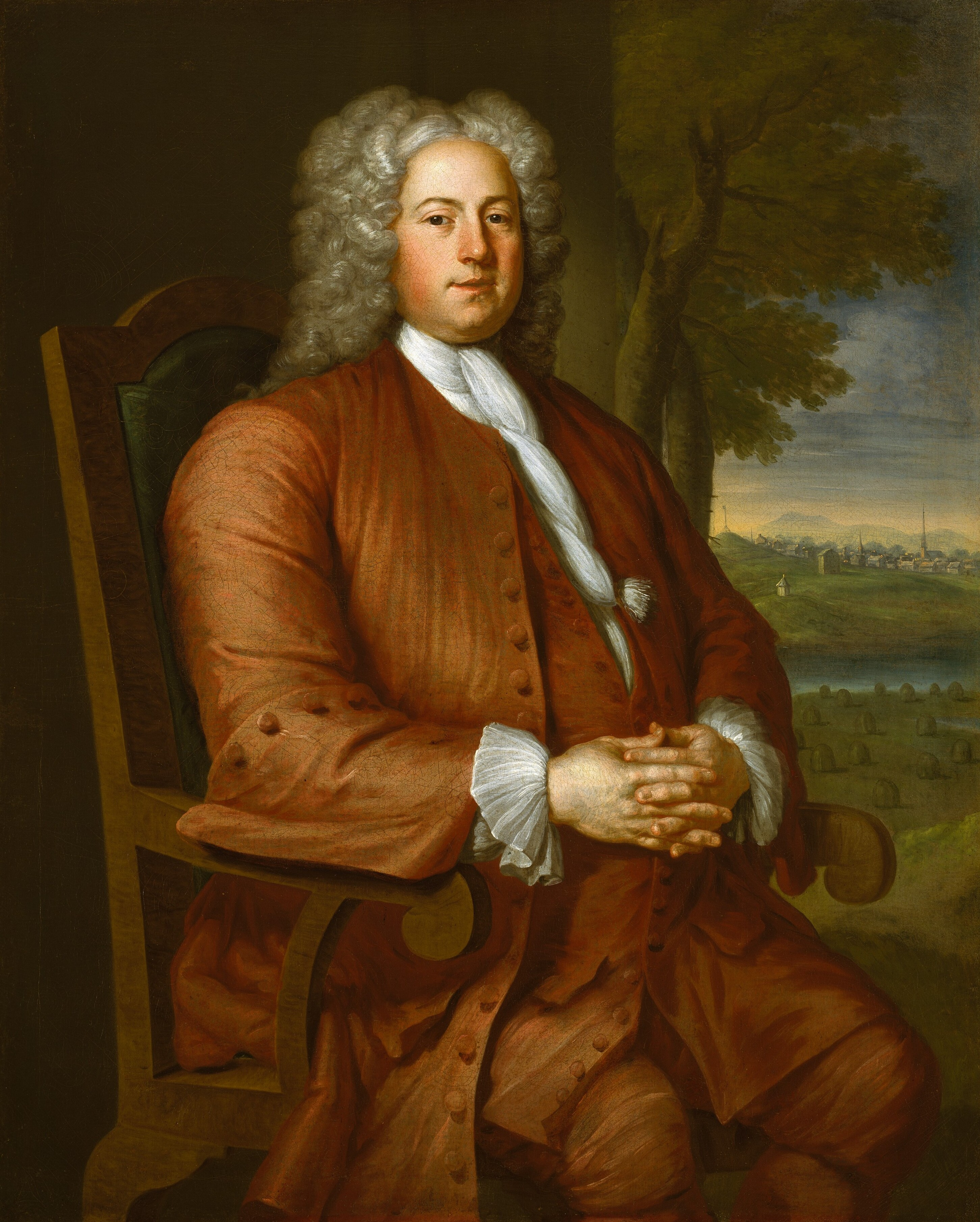
- Portrait by John Smibert, 1729
- Born: 1690; London, England
- Died: November 27, 1765 (aged 74–75); London, England
- Education: Eton College
- Occupations: Landowner, government official and military officer
- Spouse: Deborah Lyde (m. 1718)
- Children: 7
- Military career
- Allegiance: Massachusetts
- Branch: Massachusetts Militia
- Service years: 1754–1763
- Rank: Colonel
- Conflicts: French and Indian War

Colonel Francis Brinley (c. 1690 – November 27, 1765) was an English-born landowner, philanthropist and militia officer best known for being the subject of a John Smibert portrait which is currently owned by the Metropolitan Museum of Art. Though he was born and died in England, Brinley spent most of his life in the British Province of Massachusetts Bay as a prosperous landholder who became involved with several colonization projects throughout the colony.

Born in 1690 in London to American colonists who had moved back to England, Brinley spent the first two decades of his life in Europe before moving back to North America in order to inherit the estate of his grandfather in Massachusetts. In 1719, his grandfather died and left his estate to Brinley, who settled down in Massachusetts and constructed a large colonial mansion for himself known as Datchet House in the Boston neighborhood of Roxbury.

In 1718, Brinley married a wealthy heiress from Boston named Deborah Lyde. Over the following decades, Brinley established himself as a prominent member of the American gentry, acquiring landholdings and slaves along with sponsoring charitable organizations. He also served as an official in the colonial government of Massachusetts, being successively appointed as an assistant-surveyor, a deputy surveyor-general and a justice of the peace.

Brinley also became involved in colonization schemes, buying land in Suffield, Connecticut in 1735 and Framingham, Massachusetts in 1742. Upon the outbreak of the French and Indian War in 1754, he was promoted to the rank of colonel in the colonial militia. Brinley served throughout the entire duration of the war, though he personally never saw combat. After the war's end in 1763, Brinley travelled back to England, dying in London in 1765.

== Early life ==
Francis Brinley was born c. 1690 in London. Both of his parents had been born in England's North American possessions and emigrated to England at some point in time prior to Brinley's birth. Brinley's father was Thomas Brinley, who was born in Newport, Rhode Island; his mother was Catherine Page, who was from Boston, Massachusetts Bay. During his childhood, Brinley was sent to be educated at Eton College.

In 1710, after living in England for two decades, Brinley returned to British North America in the hopes that he might inherit the vast personal fortune of his grandfather, who lived in Massachusetts and was also named Francis (and for whom the younger Brinley was named). When the senior Brinley died in 1719, he left his entire estate in his will and testament to his grandson, which included a sizeable collection of household silverware.

Now in possession of a "considerable fortune", Brinley decided to settle down in Massachusetts as a member of the American gentry. He ordered the construction of a lavish colonial mansion known as Datchet House in the Boston neighborhood of Roxbury using his inheritance, which was "one of the most splendid residences in the colony at that time." One of Brinley's descendants claimed in an 1853 book that the mansion was modeled after an English country house near the Berkshire village of Datchet, which the descendant also claimed the mansion was named after.

== Political career and landholdings ==
In 1718, Brinley married Deborah Lyde, a wealthy and socially influential heiress who was the daughter of a moneyed couple from Boston, Edward Lyde and his wife Catherine. Over the course of their marriage, the couple went on to have seven children together, one of whom, a son, was named Francis after his father. In addition to owning an equivalent amount of wealth as her husband, Deborah maintained connections with aristocratic circles in England, which allowed her to emulate the most recent cultural trends and fashions in Europe, a comparative rarity in North America.

Over the next decades, Brinley established himself as a prominent member of the Massachusetts elite, acquiring extensive landholdings in Suffolk County, including several large hayfields. He also served in several legal and political offices within the colonial government of Massachusetts over the course of his career, serving as an assistant-surveyor and justice of the peace; Brinley was appointed to the latter position by the governor of Massachusetts, William Shirley, on June 27, 1743. Brinley would also go on to serve as a deputy surveyor-general of Massachusetts.

Anglo-Irish philosopher and clergyman George Berkeley made a visit to Britain's North American colonies in 1728. Accompanied by his family, he visited Boston, where his entourage was invited by Brinley to stay at Datchet House for the duration of their stay. Berkeley was attempting to promote the spread of Palladian architecture in British North America, an architectural style that Brinley had ordered his to be built in; historian Margaretta M. Lovell suggested that it was this factor which played a major role in Berkeley's decision to live in Datchet House while staying in Boston.

The next year, Brinley commissioned Scottish-born painter John Smibert, who had accompanied Berkeley to North America, to paint portraits of both himself and his wife and child. Smibert's portrait of Brinley depicted both Queen Anne style furniture that he owned and Brinley's landholdings; the portrait Smibert made of Deborah and her son Francis depicted a small orange tree she owned, an expensive rarity in North America. Lovell argued that given Brinley's wealth and European connections, "[it was] not surprising... that Brinley was one of Smibert's first customers".

Beginning in the 1730s, Brinley started to dabble in colonization projects as well. In 1732, the General Court of Massachusetts issued a land grant consisting of six square miles to a colonist named Christopher Jacob Lawton from Suffield, Connecticut for a sum of money, in line with a boundary agreement negotiated in 1713. Three years later, Lawton divided up the grant and sold a portion of it (consisting of roughly a quarter of what he had purchased in 1732) to Brinley, who subsequently became one of the town proprietors of Suffield alongside Lawton and two other investors.

== Later life and death ==
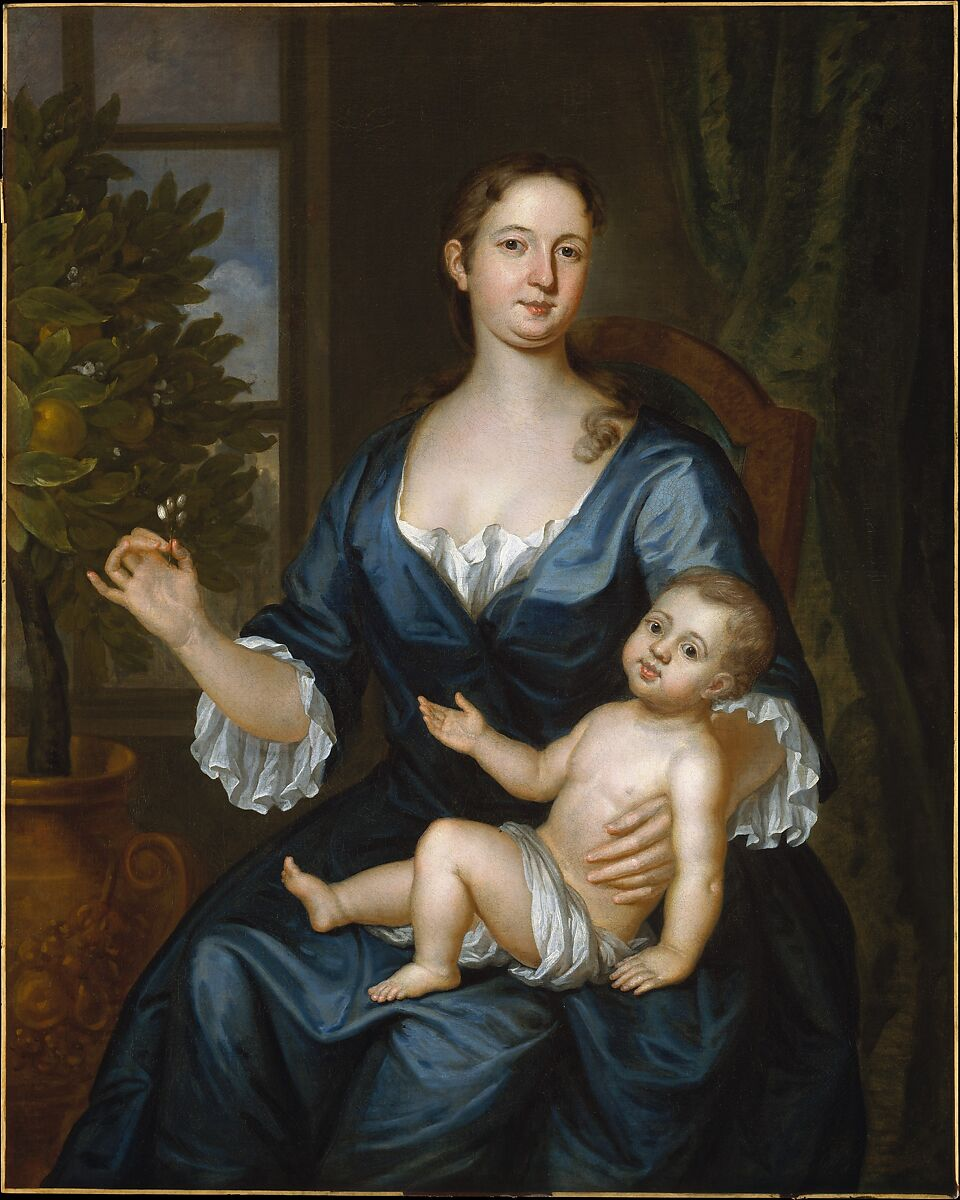
A 1729 portrait of Deborah Brinley and her son Francis by John Smibert

On February 1, 1742, Brinley purchased a land grant in the town of Framingham, Massachusetts from Colonel Joseph Buckminster and his sons Joseph and Thomas for the sum of 8,600 pounds in public credit. The grant consisted of 860 acres of land, 400 of which had been already colonized. Brinley later issued a surety for a colonist named George Craddock, who purchased portions of Brinley's grant and leased it to Anglo-Irish naval officer Sir Peter Warren.

In November 1747, an attempt by Royal Navy officer Charles Knowles to impress a group of sailors into his squadron led to the eruption of a riot in Boston. After Knowles had sent press gangs into the city, an angry mob responded by taking several British naval officers hostage. One hostage, a Captain Erskine, was briefly held at Datchet House under Brinley's care on the 19th of November before being released; the riot subsided after Knowles released the sailors.

Brinley was also commissioned into the provincial militia during his time in Massachusetts. When the French and Indian War between the American colonies of Great Britain and France broke out in 1754, Brinley was promoted to the rank of colonel and appointed as the commander of the Roxbury regiment, a unit of the provincial militia. Brinley continued to serve in the provincial militia throughout the duration of the conflict, though he personally never saw any combat.

Brinley's landholdings in Massachusetts were expanded in 1760, when his fourth son Nathaniel leased a plot of land (referred to by historians as the "Brinley Farm") from a merchant and politician in New York named Oliver De Lancey. Nathaniel also personally purchased between fifteen and twenty Black slaves to work on the leased land as farmers. In 1761, Deborah died at Datchet House, leaving Brinley a widower; he never remarried after her death.

After the French and Indian War ended in 1763, Brinley travelled to England, dying in London on November 27, 1765, the same city in which he had been born. Having accumulated a fortune while in Massachusetts, Brinley left a large estate upon his death, which included several slaves he had acquired and numerous pieces of real estate in Eastern Massachusetts. His mansion at Roxbury continued to stand until 1902, when it was demolished to build a residence for local Catholic clergymen.

== Personal life and legacy ==
As noted by American historian Oswaldo Rodriguez Roque, Brinley "passed [most of] his life rather uneventfully". His personal life and financial activities were supported by Brinley's familial connection to Nathaniel Byfield, an English-born jurist who served as the speaker of the Massachusetts General Court from 1693 to 1694 and was "one of the most important and best-connected men in the colony"; Byfield was the maternal grandfather of Deborah. When Byfield died in 1733, his last will and testament left his estate to Brinley and Deborah, vastly increasing their wealth.

Brinley also engaged in several philanthropic ventures over the course of his life; according to Unitarian clergyman Henry Wilder Foote, he "was of a liberal and hospital nature". In 1724, Brinley became a member of the Boston Episcopal Charitable Society, a charitable organization established to distribute charity to impoverished members of the Church of England living in Boston. He also frequently made large donations to King's Chapel, an independent Christian Unitarian church built in 1754, which like Datchet House was also constructed in the neoclassical style.

After Brinley's death, the paintings he had commissioned from Smibert and the silverware he inherited from his grandfather were eventually acquired by several prominent museums. In 1962, the Metropolitan Museum of Art purchased the portraits of Brinley and his wife from a New York company; the paintings had been in the Brinley family's possession until 1878. Brinley's personal collection of silverware was sold by his descendants in 1878, and was eventually purchased by the Winterthur Museum, Garden and Library estate in Winterthur, New Castle County, Delaware.

Of Brinley's seven children, Thomas went on to play a role during the American Revolution. After graduating from Harvard College in 1744, Thomas settled down in Boston and started working as a merchant. In 1774, his name was included in a petition of merchants to Governor Thomas Hutchinson expressing their loyalty to the British Crown; Thomas also signed a similar petition to British Army general Thomas Gage in 1775. When the American Revolutionary War broke out in 1776, Thomas fled from Boston to England via Nova Scotia as a Loyalist, dying there in 1778.
