= List of speakers of the Massachusetts House of Representatives =

Speaker of the Massachusetts House of Representatives
- Seal of the House of Representatives

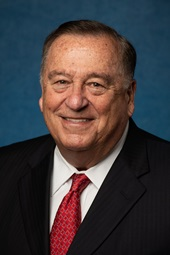
- Incumbent; Ron Mariano since December 30, 2020
- Government of Massachusetts
- Status: Presiding Officer
- Member of: General Court
- Residence: None official
- Seat: State House, Boston, Massachusetts
- Nominator: Political parties through majority house caucus
- Appointer: The House
- Constituting instrument: Constitution of Massachusetts
- Formation: Original Post: May 30, 1644; Current form: October 25, 1780
- Deputy: Speaker pro tempore

This is a list of speakers of the Massachusetts House of Representatives. The Speaker of the House presides over the House of Representatives. The Speaker is elected by the majority party caucus followed by confirmation of the full House through the passage of a House Resolution. As well as presiding over the body, the Speaker is also the chief leader, and controls the flow of legislation. Other House leaders, such as the majority and minority leaders, are elected by their respective party caucuses relative to their party's strength in the House. The current house speaker is Ronald Mariano.

== Colonial period ==
=== House of Deputies of the Massachusetts Bay Colony ===
Speaker	Portrait	Years ↑	Town	Electoral history
William Hathorne		1644–1645	Salem	
George Cooke		1645	Cambridge	
William Hathorne		1646	Salem	
Robert Bridges		1646	Lynn	
Joseph Hills		1647	Mistick Side	
William Hathorne		1648	Salem	
Richard Russell		1648	Charlestown	
Daniel Denison		1649	Ipswich	
William Hathorne		1650	Salem	
Daniel Gookin		1651	Cambridge	
Daniel Denison		1651–1652	Ipswich	
Humphrey Atherton		1653	Springfield	
Richard Russell		1654	Charlestown	
Edward Johnson		1655		
Richard Russell		1656	Charlestown	
William Hathorne		1657	Salem	
Richard Russell		1658	Charlestown	
Thomas Savage		1659–1660		
William Hathorne		1660–1661	Salem	
Thomas Clarke		1662		
John Leverett		1663–1664	Boston	
Thomas Clarke		1665		
Richard Waldron		1666–1668	Cocheco	
Thomas Clarke		1669–1670		
Thomas Savage		1671	Boston	
Thomas Clarke		1672		
Richard Waldron		1673	Cocheco	
Joshua Hubbard		1673–1674		
Richard Waldron		1674–1675	Cocheco	
Peter Bulkeley		1675–1676	Concord	
Thomas Savage		1677–1678	Boston	
Richard Waldron		1679	Cocheco	Town became part of New Hampshire
John Richards		1679–1680	Dorchester	
Daniel Fisher		1680–1682	Dedham	
Elisha Cooke Sr.		1683	Boston	
John Waite		1684	Malden	
Isaac Addington		1685	Boston	
John Saffin		1686	Boston	General Court adjourned May 21, 1686, did not convene until May or June 1689

=== Inter-Charter Period ===
Speaker	Portrait	Years ↑	Town	Electoral history
Thomas Oakes		1689	Boston	
John Bowles		1698–1690	Boston	
Penn Townsend		1690–1691	Salem	
William Bond		1691–1692	Watertown	
Penn Townsend		1692	Salem	

=== Second Charter of the Province of Massachusetts Bay ===
Speaker	Portrait	Years ↑	Town	Electoral history
William Bond		1692–1693	Watertown	
Nathaniel Byfield		1693–1694	Boston	
Nehemiah Jewett		1694–1695	Rowley	
William Bond		1695–1696	Watertown	
Penn Townsend		1696–1697	Salem	
Nathaniel Byfield		1698	Rowley	
James Converse		1699–1700	Woburn	
John Leverett		1700–1701	Boston	
Nehemiah Jewett		1701–1702	Rowley	
James Converse		1702–1705	Woburn	
Thomas Oakes		1705–1707	Boston	
John Burrill		1707	Lynn	
Thomas Oliver		1708–1709	Cambridge	
John Clark		1709–1711	Boston	
John Burrill		1711–1720	Lynn	
Elisha Cooke Jr.		1720		
Timothy Lindall		1720–1721	Boston	
John Clark		1721–1724	Boston	
William Dudley		1724–1729	Roxbury	
John Quincy		1729–1741	Mount Wollaston	
William Fairfield		1741	Wenham	
Thomas Cushing II		1742–1746	Boston	
Thomas Hutchinson		1746–1748	Boston	Resigned when appointed to the Governor's Council
Joseph Dwight		1748–1750	Brookfield	
Thomas Hubbard		1750–1759	Waltham	
Samuel White		May 30, 1759 – May 28, 1760	Taunton	
James Otis Sr.		May 28, 1760 – May 26, 1762	Barnstable	Resigned when appointed to the Governor's Council
Timothy Ruggles		May 26, 1762 – May 25, 1764	Rochester	
Samuel White		May 25, 1764 – June 11, 1764	Taunton	
Thomas Clap pro tem		June 11, 1764 – May 29, 1765		
Samuel White		May 29, 1764 – May 28, 1766	Taunton	
James Otis Jr.		May 28, 1766 – May 28, 1766	Barnstable	
Thomas Cushing		May 28, 1766 – 1774	Boston	

== Massachusetts Provincial Congress of Deputies ==
Speaker	Portrait	Years ↑	Electoral history
John Hancock		1774–1775	Left office to attend the Second Continental Congress where he served as President
Joseph Warren		1775	Died at the Battle of Bunker Hill
James Warren		1775–1780	

== House of Representatives under the Massachusetts Constitution ==
#	Portrait	Speaker	Party	Years ↑	City or Town (District)^{1}	Electoral history
1		Caleb Davis	None	1780–1782	Boston	Resigned
2		Nathaniel Gorham	None	1782–1783	Charlestown	[data missing]
3		Tristram Dalton	None	1783–1784	Newbury	Elected to State Senate
4		Samuel Allyne Otis	None	1784–1785	Barnstable	[data missing]
5		Nathaniel Gorham	None	1785–1786	Charlestown	[data missing]
6		Artemas Ward	None	1786–1787	Shrewsbury	[data missing]
7		James Warren	None	1787–1788	Plymouth	[data missing]
8		Theodore Sedgwick	Pro-Administration	1788–1789	Sheffield	Elected to the U.S. House of Representatives
9		David Cobb	Pro-Administration	1789–1793	Taunton	Elected to the U.S. House of Representatives
10		Edward Robbins	Democratic-Republican	1793–1802	Boston	Elected Lieutenant Governor of Massachusetts
11		John Coffin Jones	Federalist	1802–1803	Boston	[data missing]
12		Harrison Gray Otis	Federalist	1803–1805	Boston	Elected to the State Senate
13		Timothy Bigelow	Federalist	1805–1806	Worcester	Party lost majority
14		Perez Morton	Democratic-Republican	1806–1808	Dorchester	Party lost majority
15		Timothy Bigelow	Federalist	1808–1810	Worcester	Party lost majority
16		Perez Morton	Democratic-Republican	1810–1811	Dorchester	Resigned
17		Joseph Story	Democratic-Republican	1811–1812	Salem	Resigned when appointed Associate Justice of the Supreme Court of the United States
18		Eleazer Ripley	Democratic-Republican	1812	Waterville	Joined United States Army
19		Timothy Bigelow	Federalist	1812–1820	Worcester	[data missing]
20		Elijah H. Mills	Federalist	1820–1821	Northampton	Elected to the U.S. House of Representatives
21		Josiah Quincy III	Federalist	1821–1822	Boston	Resigned to become Judge of Boston Municipal Court
22		Luther Lawrence	Federalist	1822	Lowell	Party lost majority
23		Levi Lincoln Jr.	National Republican	1822–1823	Worcester	Elected Lieutenant Governor of Massachusetts
24		William C. Jarvis	National Republican	1823–1825	Woburn	Party lost majority
25		Timothy Fuller	Democratic-Republican	1825–1826	Cambridgeport	Party lost majority
26		William C. Jarvis	National Republican	1826–1828	Woburn	[data missing]
27		William B. Calhoun	National Republican	1828–1834	Springfield	Elected to the U.S. House of Representatives
28		Julius Rockwell	Whig	1835–1837	Pittsfield	Resigned when appointed commissioner of the Bank of Massachusetts
29		Robert Charles Winthrop	Whig	1838–1840	Boston	Elected to the U.S. House of Representatives
30		George Ashmun	Whig	1841	Blandford	[data missing]
31		Thomas H. Kinnicutt	Whig	1842	Worcester	[data missing]
32		Daniel P. King	Whig	1843	South Danvers	[data missing]
33		Thomas H. Kinnicutt	Whig	1844	Worcester	Resigned
34		Samuel H. Walley Jr.	Whig	1844–1846	Boston	[data missing]
35		Ebenezer Bradbury	Whig	1847	Newburyport	[data missing]
36		Francis Crowninshield	Whig	1848–1849	Boston	[data missing]
37		Ensign H. Kellogg	Whig	1850	Pittsfield	[data missing]
38		Nathaniel Prentice Banks	Democratic	1851–1852	Waltham	Elected to the U.S. House of Representatives
39		George Bliss	Whig	1853	Springfield	[data missing]
40		Otis P. Lord	Whig	1854	Salem	Party lost majority
41		Daniel C. Eddy	Know Nothing	1855	Lowell	[data missing]
42		Charles A. Phelps	Know Nothing	1856–1857	Boston	Elected to the Massachusetts Senate; Party Lost election
43		Julius Rockwell	Republican	1858	Pittsfield	Resigned when appointed to the Massachusetts Superior Court
44		Charles Hale	Republican	1859	Boston	[data missing]
45		John A. Goodwin	Republican	1860–1861	Lowell	[data missing]
46		Alexander Hamilton Bullock	Republican	1862–1865	Worcester	Elected Governor of Massachusetts
47		James M. Stone	Republican	1866–1867	Charlestown	[data missing]
48		Harvey Jewell	Republican	1868–1871	Boston	[data missing]
49		John E. Sanford	Republican	1872–1875	Taunton	[data missing]
50		John Davis Long	Republican	1876–1878	Hingham	Elected Lieutenant Governor of Massachusetts
51		Levi C. Wade	Republican	1879	Newton	[data missing]
52		Charles J. Noyes	Republican	1880–1882	Boston (14th Suffolk)	[data missing]
53		George Augustus Marden	Republican	1883–1884	Lowell	[data missing]
54		John Q. A. Brackett	Republican	January 7, 1885 – 1886	Boston (17th Suffolk)	Elected Lieutenant Governor of Massachusetts
55		Charles J. Noyes	Republican	1887–1888	Boston (14th Suffolk)	[data missing]
56		William Emerson Barrett	Republican	1889–1893	Melrose (11th Middlesex)	Elected to the U.S. House of Representatives
57		George von Lengerke Meyer	Republican	1894–1896	Boston (9th Suffolk)	[data missing]
58		John Lewis Bates	Republican	1897–1899	Boston (1st Suffolk)	Elected Lieutenant Governor of Massachusetts
59		James J. Myers	Republican	1900–1903	Cambridge (1st Middlesex)	Retired
60		Louis A. Frothingham	Republican	1904–1905	Boston (11th Suffolk)	Left House to run for governor
61		John N. Cole	Republican	1906–1908	Andover (8th Essex)	Left House to run for Lieutenant Governor
62		Joseph Walker	Republican	1909–1911	Brookline (2nd Norfolk)	Left House to run for governor
63		Grafton D. Cushing	Republican	1912–1914	Boston (11th Suffolk)	Elected Lieutenant Governor of Massachusetts
64		Channing H. Cox	Republican	1915–1918	Boston (10th Suffolk)	Elected Lieutenant Governor of Massachusetts
65		Joseph E. Warner	Republican	1919–1920	Taunton (4th Bristol)	Lost primary for Lieutenant Governor of Massachusetts to Alvan Fuller
66		Benjamin Loring Young	Republican	1921–1924	Weston (13th Middlesex)	[data missing]
67		John C. Hull	Republican	1925–1928	Leominster (11th Worcester)	Appointed First Securities Director in the wake of The Great Depression (1930–36)
68		Leverett Saltonstall	Republican	1929–1936	Chestnut Hill (5th Middlesex)	Defeated for election as Lieutenant Governor by Francis E. Kelly
69		Horace T. Cahill	Republican	1937–1938	Braintree (6th Norfolk)	Elected Lieutenant Governor of Massachusetts
70		Christian Herter	Republican	1939–1942	Boston (5th Suffolk)	Elected to the U.S. House of Representatives
71		Rudolph King	Republican	1943–1944	Millis (8th Norfolk)	Resigned to run become Registrar of Motor Vehicles
72		Frederick Willis	Republican	1945–1948	Saugus (10th Essex)	Party lost majority
73		Thomas P. O'Neill	Democratic	1949–1952	Cambridge (3rd Middlesex)	Party lost majority; O'Neill elected to U.S. House of Representatives
74		Charles Gibbons	Republican	1953–1954	Stoneham (22nd Middlesex)	Party lost majority
75		Michael F. Skerry	Democratic	1955–1957	Medford (27th Middlesex)	Resigned when appointed Clerk of the Malden District Court
76		John F. Thompson	Democratic	1958–1964	Ludlow (2nd Hampden)	Resigned after being indicted on charges of conspiracy and bribery
77		John Davoren	Democratic	1965–1967	Milford (9th Worcester)	Resigned when appointed Secretary of the Commonwealth
78		Robert H. Quinn	Democratic	1967–1969	Boston (9th Suffolk)	Elected Massachusetts Attorney General
79		David M. Bartley	Democratic	1969–1975	Holyoke (7th Hampden)	Resigned to become President of Holyoke Community College
80		Thomas W. McGee	Democratic	1975–1984	Lynn (20th Essex)	Defeated by Keverian in leadership challenge
81		George Keverian	Democratic	1985–1990	Everett (39th Middlesex)	Retired to run for State Treasurer
82		Charles Flaherty	Democratic	1991 – April 9, 1996	Cambridge (27th Middlesex)	Resigned: pleaded guilty to tax evasion
83		Thomas Finneran	Democratic	April 9, 1996 – September 28, 2004	Mattapan (12th Suffolk)	Resigned after pleading guilty to obstruction of justice
84		Salvatore DiMasi	Democratic	September 28, 2004 – January 27, 2009	Boston (3rd Suffolk)	Resigned: convicted of conspiracy, honest services fraud, and extortion
85		Robert DeLeo	Democratic	January 27, 2009 – December 29, 2020	Winthrop (19th Suffolk)	Resigned to accept position at Northeastern University
86		Ron Mariano	Democratic	December 30, 2020 – present	Quincy (3rd Norfolk)	Current speaker

== See also ==
- List of presidents of the Massachusetts Senate
- List of Massachusetts General Courts
- List of former districts of the Massachusetts House of Representatives

== Notes ==
1. Prior to 1857, representatives were selected by a majority of votes at a town meeting. Since 1857, representatives have been elected by district.

== Sources ==
- "Organization of the Legislature Since 1780". Manual for the General Court. Massachusetts General Court. 2005–2006. pp. 338–350.
