= Nathaniel Byfield =

American jurist and politician (1653–1733)

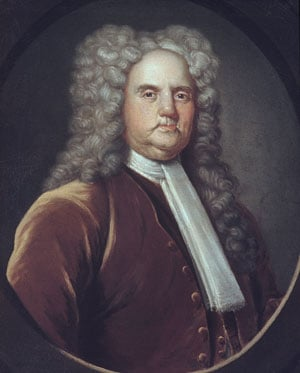
- Portrait, c. 1730

Speaker of the Massachusetts Province House of Representatives
- In office 1693–1694
- Preceded by: William Bond
- Succeeded by: Nehemiah Jewett

Personal details
- Born: c. 1653 Long Ditton, Surrey, England
- Died: 6 June 1733 (aged 79–80) Boston, Province of Massachusetts Bay, British America
- Spouse: Deborah Clarke (m. 1675)
- Children: 5
- Relatives: William Tailer (son-in-law)
- Occupation: Jurist; politician

Nathaniel Byfield (c. 1653 – 6 June 1733) was an English-born Massachusetts jurist and politician who served as Speaker of the Massachusetts General Court (then the Massachusetts Province House of Representatives) from 1693 to 1694.

== Biography ==
Coat of Arms of Nathaniel Byfield

Nathaniel Byfield, first judge of the Court of Vice-Admiralty was born in 1653, at Long Ditton, a suburb in the Borough of Elmbridge in Surrey, England. He was the twenty-first child of Richard Byfield, rector there, and grandson of the vicar of Stratford-on-Avon. His father, as a member of the Westminster Assembly, helped to prepare the Westminster Shorter Catechism. His mother, Sarah Juxon, was, like many early New Englanders, 'nearly related' to an Archbishop of Canterbury, William Juxon.

Byfield arrived in Boston in 1674 as a young man, and the next year married Deborah, daughter of Captain Thomas Clarke. Having been drafted to fight the Indians, he based a claim for exemption on XXIV Deuteronomy 5. At the close of King Philip's War he invested heavily in Rhode Island lands, becoming a settler at Bristol, Rhode Island, and living part of the time at Pappoosquaws Point better known in connection with Nathanael Herreshoff, the famous yacht builder.

Byfield joined the Ancient and Honorable Artillery Company in 1679, was a member of the Massachusetts General Court in 1696 and 1697, and served as speaker in 1698. He was commissioner for forming the excise, and judge of probate for Bristol County, as well as of the Inferior Court of Common Pleas in Bristol and Suffolk. In June 1710, he was suspended from the office of judge of probate "for unmannerly and rude behaviour," but resumed office in December 1715. He was the first judge of the Court of Vice-Admiralty from 9 June 1699, to 20 May 1700, when Wait Winthrop obtained the place. Byfield threatened Winthrop and succeeded, through Governor Dudley, in securing his removal in 1701; he obtained the office for himself in December 1703, holding it until 1715, and a third time from 1728 to 1733.

In earlier years the judge exercised much influence through his political alliance with Dudley and his marriage, in 1718, to Governor Leverett's daughter Sarah, following the death of his first wife. Cotton Mather, in February, 1702 or 1703, received a visit from Governor Dudley, whom Mather advised to allow no people to say that the governor's policies were dictated by Byfield and Leverett. Mather continues: "The Wretch went unto those Men, and told them, that I had advised him, to be no ways advised by them: and inflamed them into an implacable Rage against me."

Byfield was a man of positive traits, dictatorial and overbearing, ambitious and revengeful, yet so sound that no decision of his was ever, upon appeal, reversed by a higher court. He printed and gave away thousands of copies of the Shorter Catechism; he strenuously opposed the witchcraft delusion, gave hundreds of pounds yearly in charity, and devoted his eloquence freely to public affairs.

He died between the hours of one and two of the morning of 6 June 1733, at Boston, and was entombed at Granary Burying Ground. Two of his five children grew to maturity, one the wife of Lieutenant Governor William Tailer, another the wife of Edward Lyde, whose son, Byfield Lyde (son-in-law of Governor Belcher), and daughter, Deborah Brinley, wife of Francis Brinley, were his chief heirs.

At Granary Burying Ground, Byfield rests in Tomb #49 or #50, which is marked by stone bearing the Lyde family crest, along the Tremont Street fence.
