= William Hathorne =

American colonial merchant (c. 1606–1681)

Member of the Council of Assistants
- In office 1662–1679

Speaker of the General Court
- In office 1660–1661
- Preceded by: Thomas Savage
- Succeeded by: Thomas Clarke
- In office 1657–1657
- Preceded by: Richard Russell
- Succeeded by: Richard Russell
- In office 1650–1650
- Preceded by: Daniel Denison
- Succeeded by: Daniel Gookin
- In office 1648–1648
- Preceded by: Joseph Hills
- Succeeded by: Richard Russell
- In office 1646–1646
- Preceded by: George Cooke
- Succeeded by: Robert Bridges
- In office 1644–1645
- Preceded by: None (office established)
- Succeeded by: George Cooke

Member of the General Court for Salem
- In office 1634–1661

Commissioner for Massachusetts Bay
- In office 1644–1644
- In office 1650–1653
- In office 1669–1673

Personal details
- Born: c. 1606 Bray, Berkshire, Kingdom of England
- Died: 10 June 1681 (aged 70-79) Salem, Massachusetts Bay Colony, English Colonial America
- Spouse: Anne Smith
- Relations: Nathaniel Hawthorne (great-great-great grandson)
- Children: 7
- Occupation: Assistant Governor, magistrate, merchant

William Hathorne (c. 1606 – 1681) was a New England politician, judge and merchant who was Commissioner for Massachusetts Bay and Speaker of the General Court. He arrived in America on the ship Arbella, and is the first American ancestor of author Nathaniel Hawthorne (who added the "w" to the spelling of his last name).

== Early life ==
Hathorne was the son of yeoman William Hathorne, of Binfield, Berkshire, and his wife, Sara. The family lived in "substantial", "comfortable circumstances." The elder William, in his will proved in 1651, left all his "lands, buildings and tenements" in Berkshire not to the by then absent eldest son, William, but to a younger son Robert, on condition that Robert give William one hundred pounds. The younger William Hathorne had gone to America in 1630, and rose to prominence there through his own talent and efforts.

== Life in Massachusetts ==
He was a prosperous merchant in Salem, Massachusetts, was admitted as a freeman in 1634, served as a deputy representing Salem for many terms and when the House of Deputies elected a speaker for the first time, he was the one chosen. He served in that capacity for several years thereafter and was Salem's commanding character of the time period.

Hathorne was a zealous advocate of the personal rights of freemen against royal emissaries and agents.

Hathorne served as a magistrate on the highest court, and received a grant of 640 acres for service to the state. He was elected assistant to the governor in 1662 and served until 1679. He was appointed as captain of the Salem military company on May 1, 1646, and led troops to victory in King Philip's War. He was commissioned as a major in 1656.

== Personal life ==
Later, Hathorne married a certain Anne Smith and had at least two children, one of whom, Elizabeth (b. 22 July 1649), married Israel Porter (1643-1706) and was the grandmother of Israel Putnam.

== Influence on Nathaniel Hawthorne ==
William Hathorne was a reflection of the Puritan society in which he lived. Puritans came to Massachusetts to obtain religious freedom for themselves, but had no particular interest in becoming a haven for other faiths. The laws were harsh, with punishments that included fines, deprivation of property, banishment or imprisonment. For example, Hathorne had Quakers whipped in the streets of Salem.

Hathorne's son, Judge John Hathorne, is also a symbol of this period. People believed that witches were real. There was no scientific explanation for individuals' bizarre behavior, so witchcraft appeared to be the logical explanation for people's fits (which experts now suspect may have been the result of ergotism). Nothing caused more fear in the Puritan community than people who appeared to be possessed by the devil. Witchcraft was a major felony. Judge Hathorne is the best known of the witch trial judges, and he became known as the "Hanging Judge" for sentencing witches to death.

Author Nathaniel Hawthorne, who descended from these men, used his ancestors as inspiration for some of his most famous works. He was much interested in colonial history, good vs. evil, and the psychology of Puritan society. His classic novels The Scarlet Letter and The House of the Seven Gables, and the short story "Young Goodman Brown" reflect his studies.

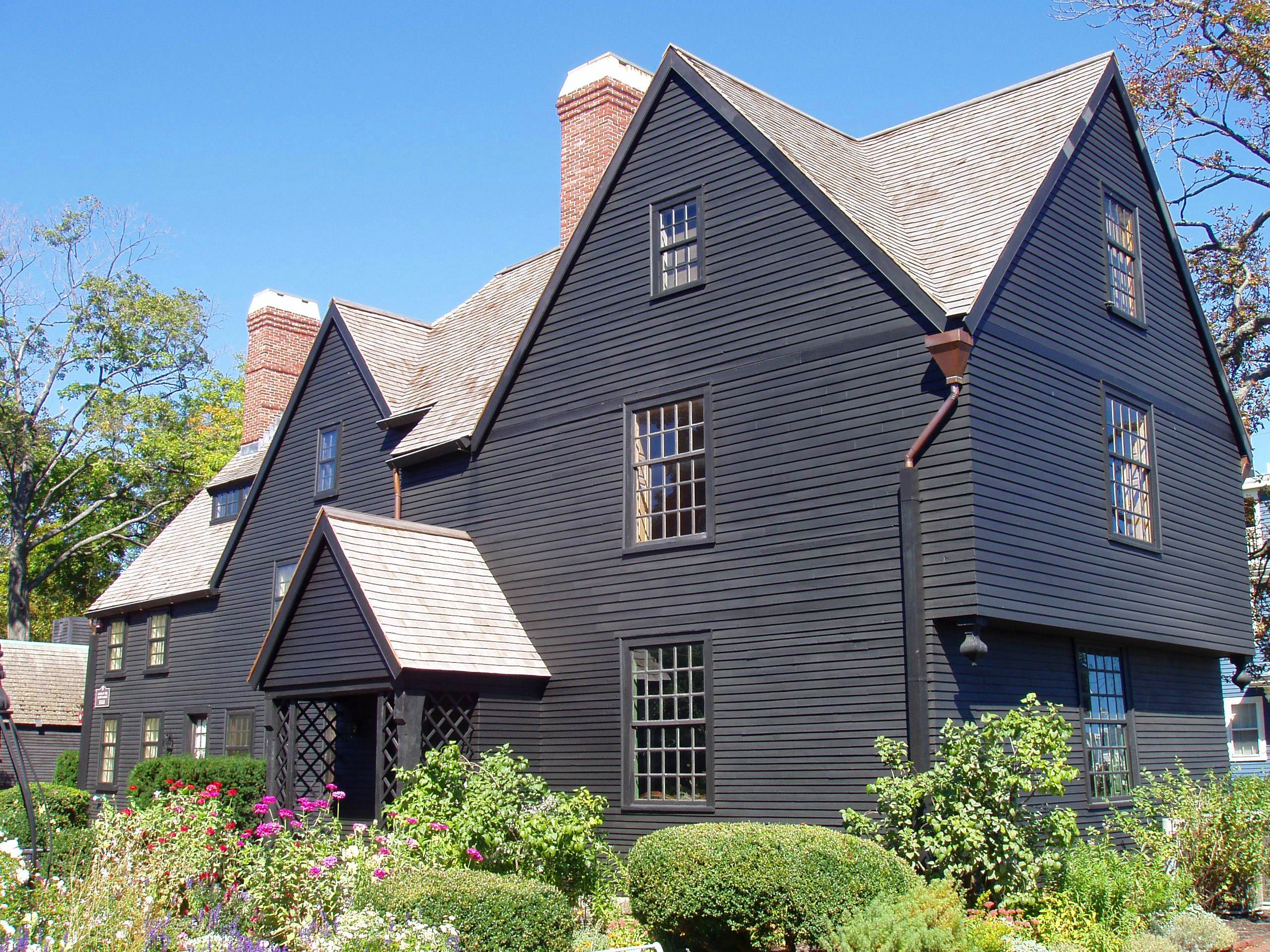
The House of the Seven Gables

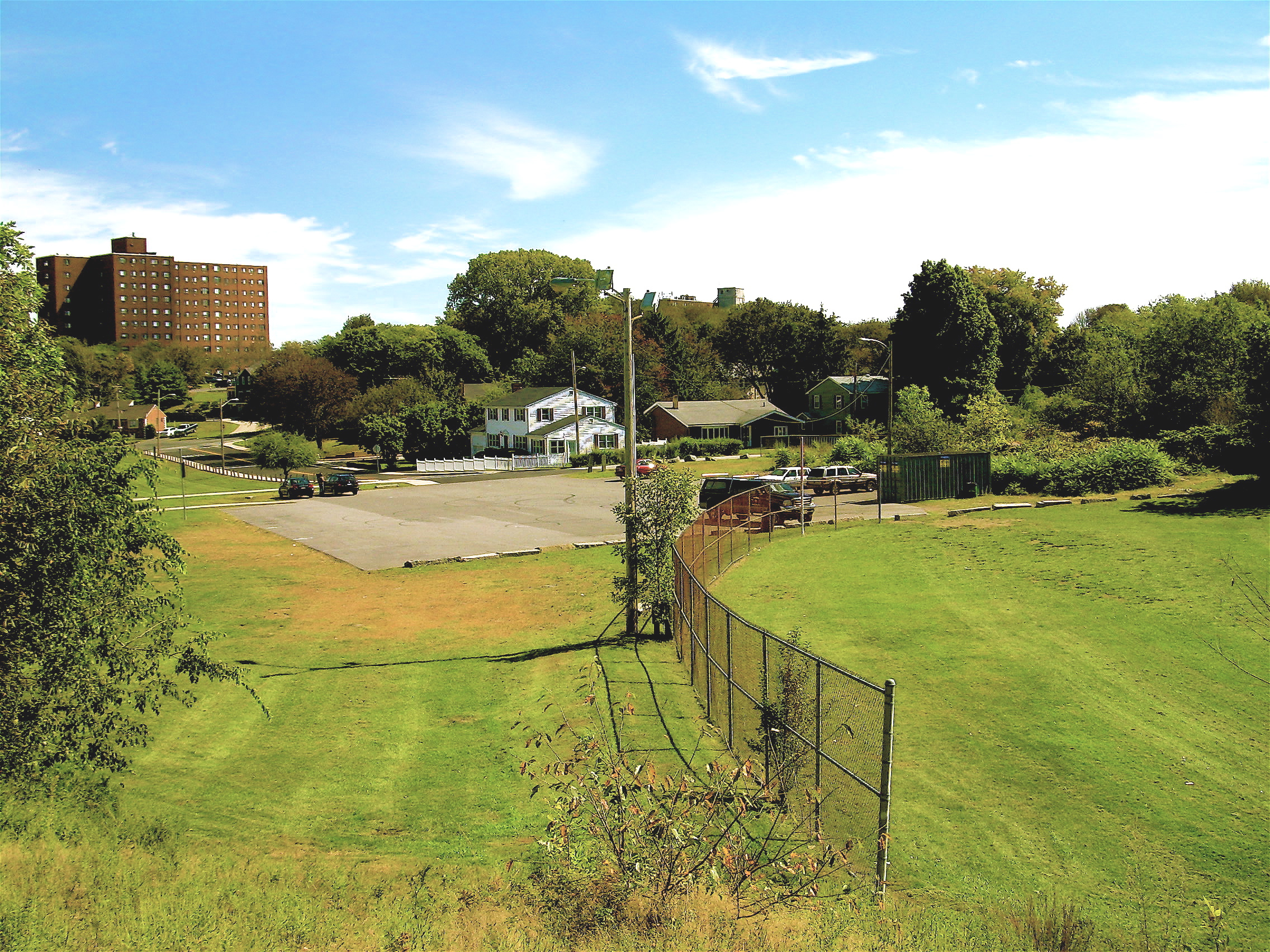
Gallows Hill Park. Popular legend places the execution of the Salem Witches near this site.

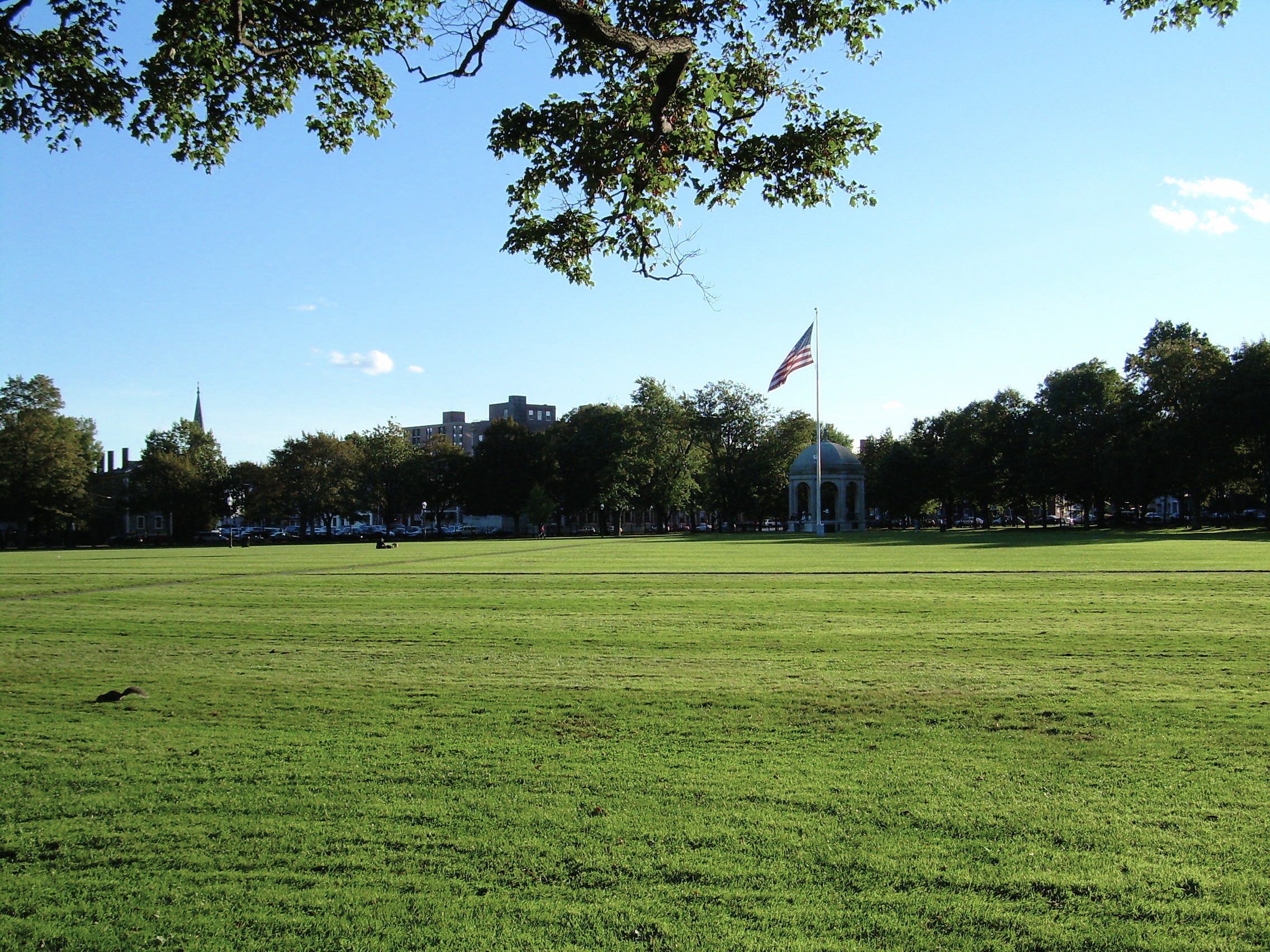
Salem Common in 2006

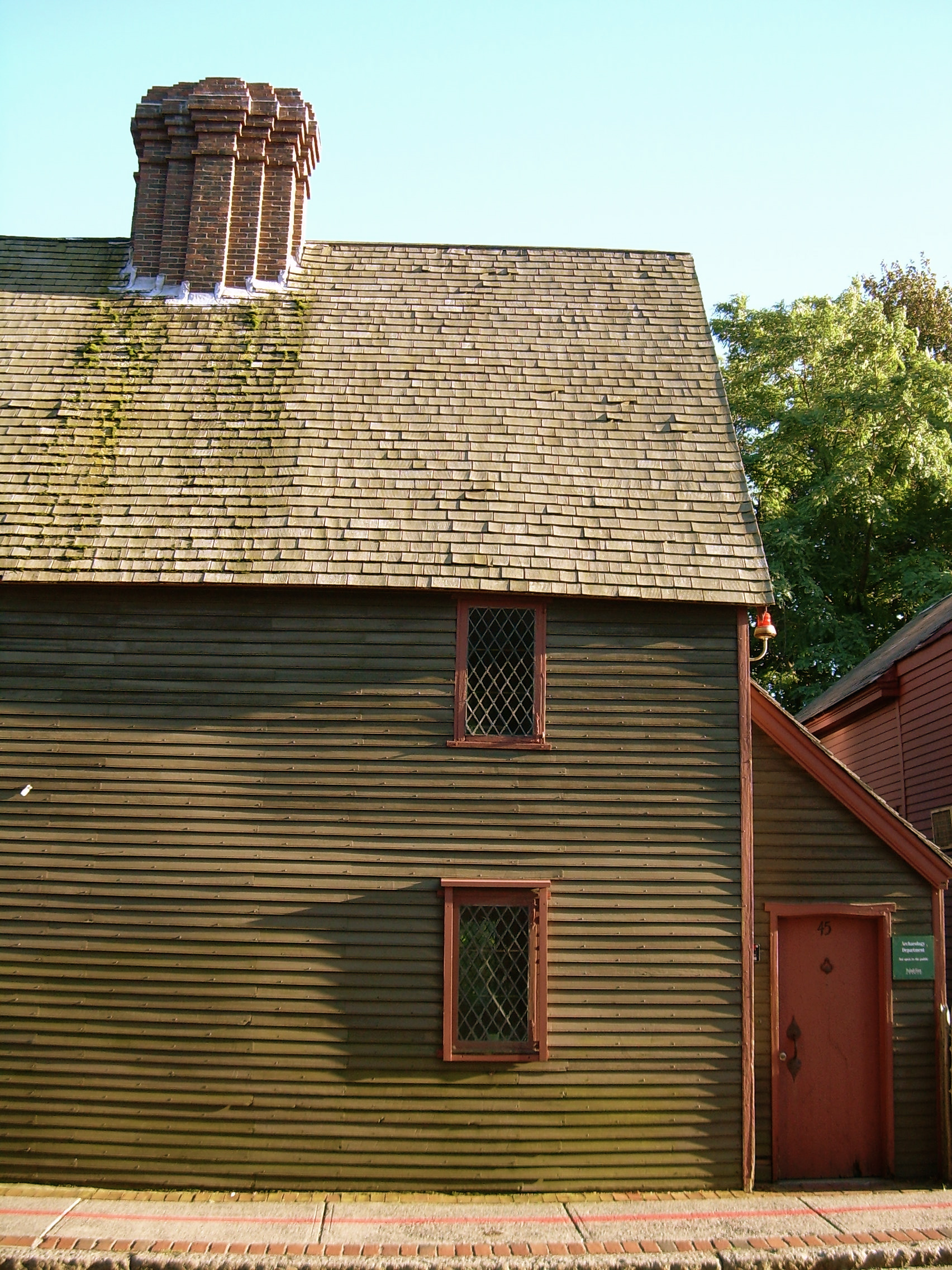
The Pickman House, c. 1664, located on Charter Street and believed to be Salem's oldest surviving building
