= John Smibert =

Scottish-born painter (1688–1751)

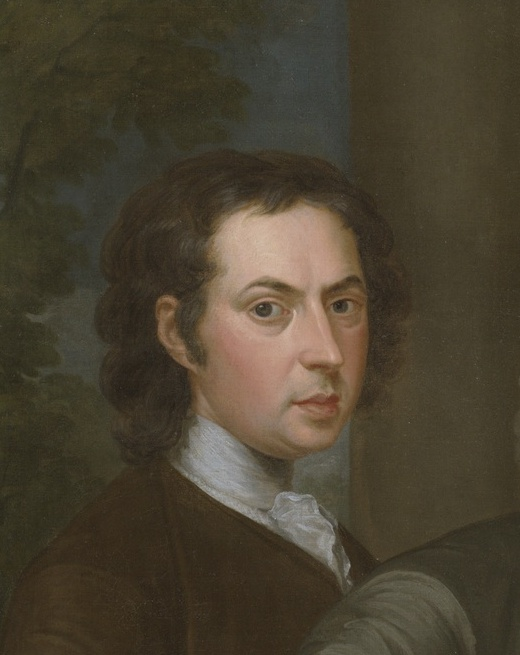
- Self-portrait, c. 1739
- Born: 24 March 1688; Edinburgh, Scotland
- Died: 2 April 1751 (aged 63); Boston, Massachusetts, British America
- Known for: Portrait painting

John Smibert (24 March 1688 – 2 April 1751) was a Scottish-born painter who specialised in portrait painting and was the first academically trained artist to work in the Thirteen Colonies.

== Career ==
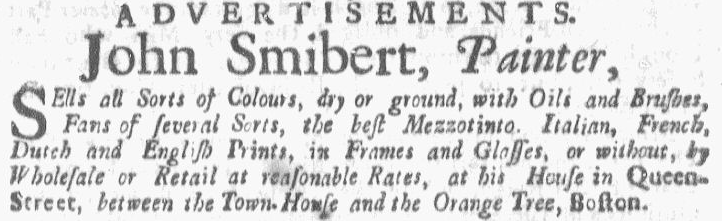
Advertisement for "John Smibert, painter, sells all sorts of colours, dry or ground, with oils and brushes. ... Wholesale or retail at reasonable rates, at his house in Queen-Street, between the Town-House and the orange tree, Boston," 1734

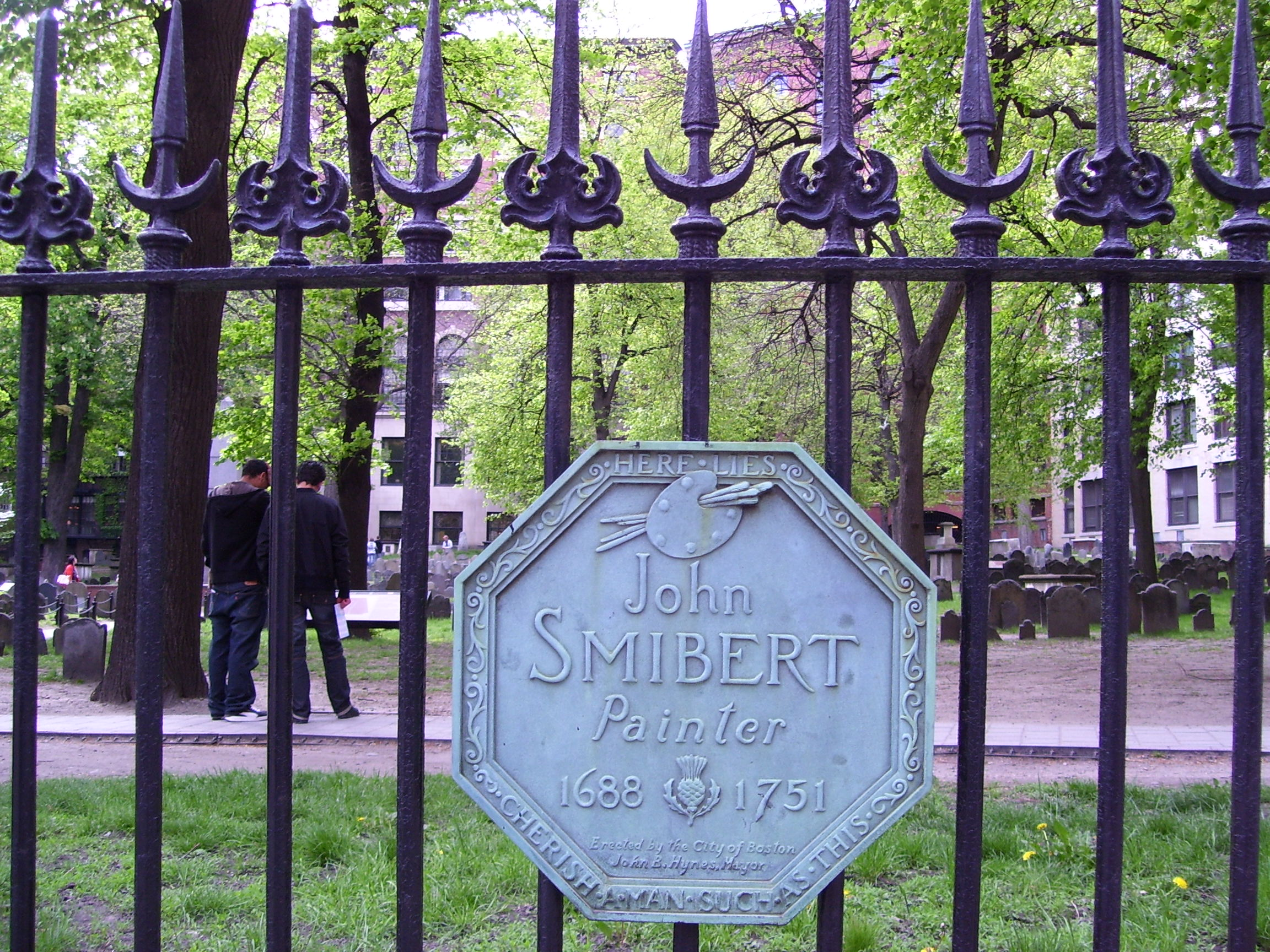
Plaque at Granary Burying Ground commemorating Smibert

Smibert was born in Edinburgh on 24 March 1688, the second youngest of six children of Alison and John Smibert, a litster, or wool dyer. From 1702 to 1709, he was apprenticed to a house painter and plasterer in Edinburgh. On moving to London in 1709 he worked as a coach painter and copyist.

1713-1716, he studied under Sir Godfrey Kneller at the Great Queen Street Academy, then returned to Edinburgh, seeking work as portraitist. Smibert travelled to Italy from 1719 to 1722 to copy old masters, including some in the collection of Cosimo III de' Medici, Grand Duke of Tuscany, and then settled in London where he worked as a portrait painter from 1722 until 1728. Smibert became a member of the Rose and Crown Club and made a sketch for a group portrait of its members, including George Vertue, John Wootton, Thomas Gibson, Bernard Lens III, and others.

Among his London portraits is one of Bishop Berkeley who, in 1728, enticed Smibert to accompany him to America, with the intention of becoming professor of fine arts in the college which Berkeley was planning to found in Bermuda. The college, however, was never established, and Smibert settled in Boston, where he married in 1730. He lived at the corner of Brattle Street and Queen-Street. He belonged to the Scots Charitable Society of Boston.

In 1728, he began painting Dean George Berkeley and His Entourage, also called The Bermuda Group, which became one of the most influential New England portraits. It was commissioned by John Wainright, a patron of George Berkeley, and depicts the members of the planned expedition to Bermuda. The painting, now in the Yale University Art Gallery, includes Berkeley at the right, Wainwright seated at left, and Smibert standing at the far left.

Smibert painted portraits of Jonathan Edwards and Judge Edmund Quincy (in the Museum of Fine Arts in Boston), Mrs Smibert, Peter Faneuil and Governor John Endecott (in the Massachusetts Historical Society), John Lovell (Memorial Hall, Harvard University), and probably one of Sir William Pepperrell; and examples of his works are owned by Harvard and Yale Universities, by Bowdoin College, by the Massachusetts Historical Society, and by the New England Historical and Genealogical Society.

In 1734, Smibert opened a shop where he sold paint, other artist's supplies, and prints. In his studio above the shop, he displayed casts and copies of Old Masters that he had painted in Europe. This collection, which Richard Saunders has termed "America's first art gallery", provided much of the early artistic education for Charles Willson Peale, Gilbert Stuart, and John Trumbull.

Between 1740 and 1742, he served as architect for the original Faneuil Hall, which he designed in the style of an English country market. The hall burned down in 1761 but was restored, and then in 1806 greatly expanded and modified by Charles Bulfinch.

His son Nathaniel was also a painter. Smibert lies in Tomb 62 in the Granary Burying Ground in Boston.

== Gallery ==
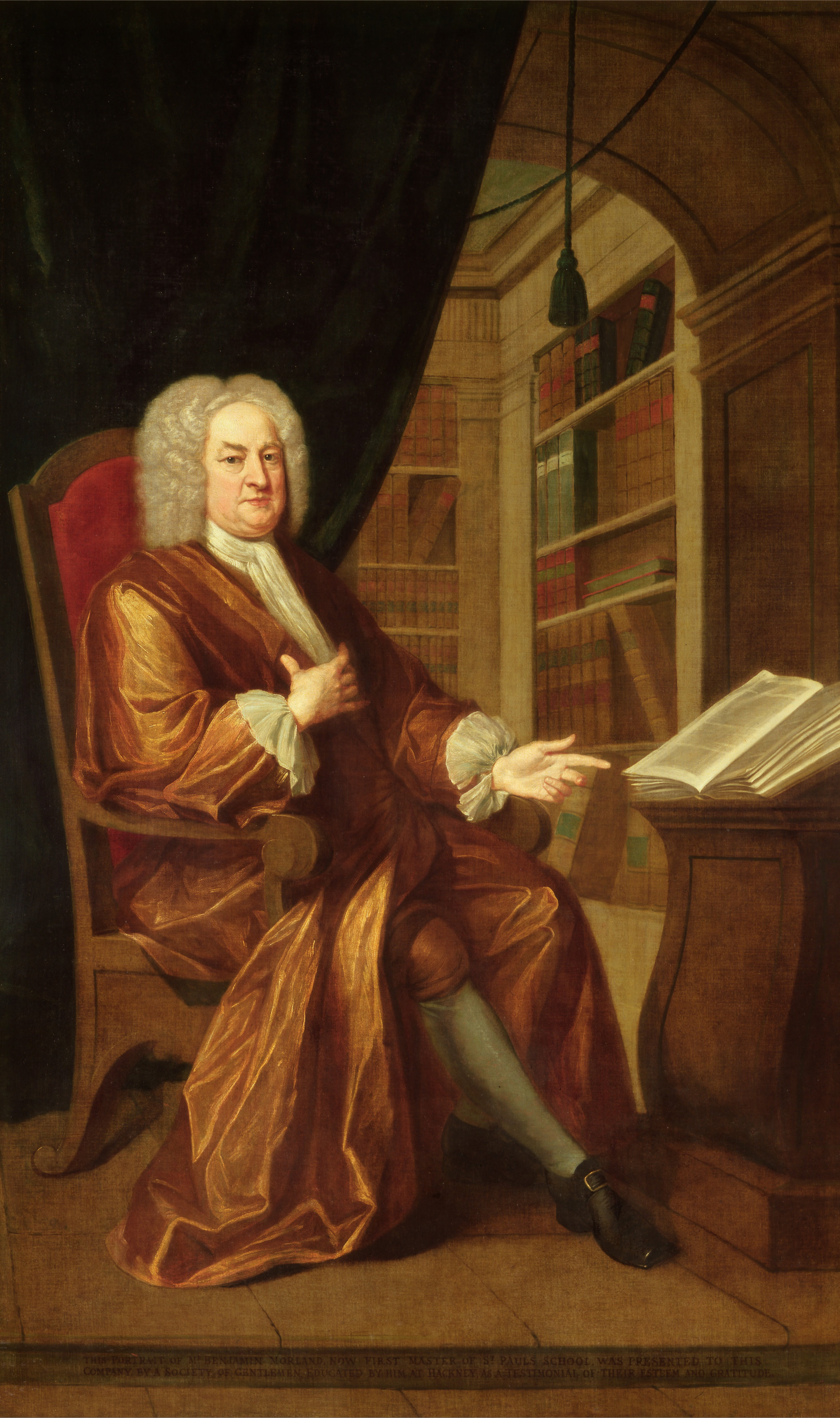
Benjamin Moreland, High Master of St. Paul's School (1724)

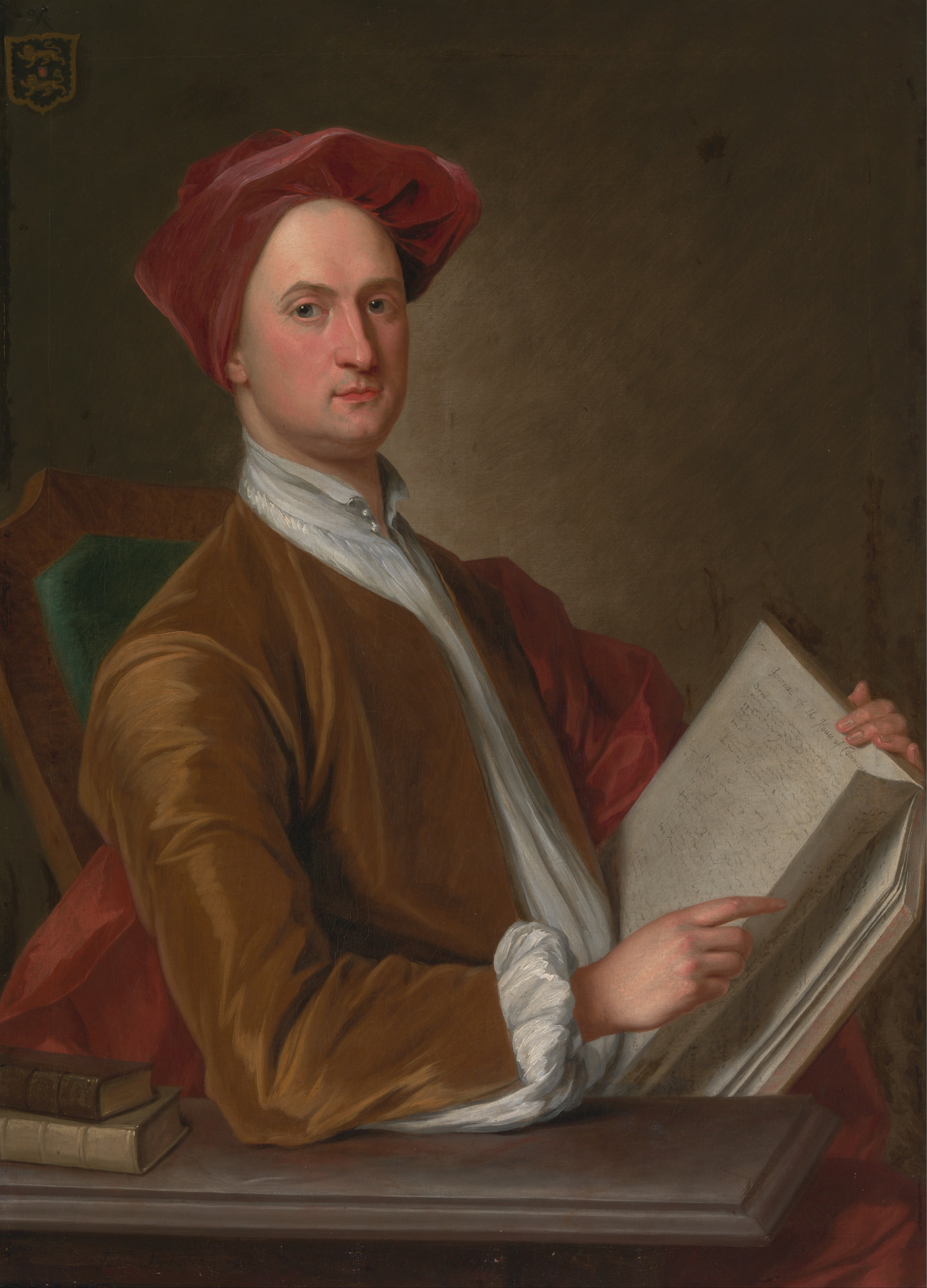
Sir John Rushout, Bt. (1726)

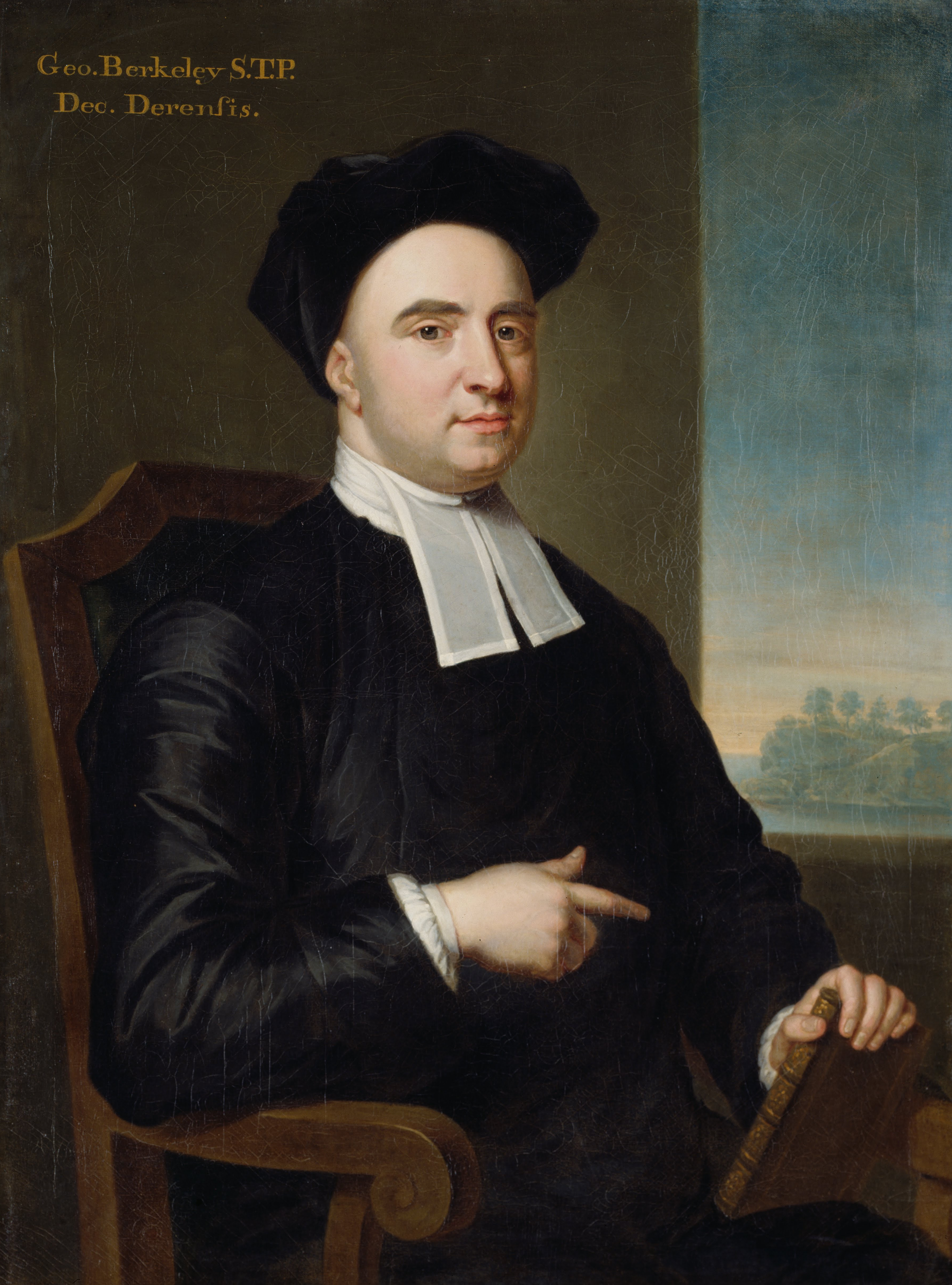
Bishop George Berkeley (1727)

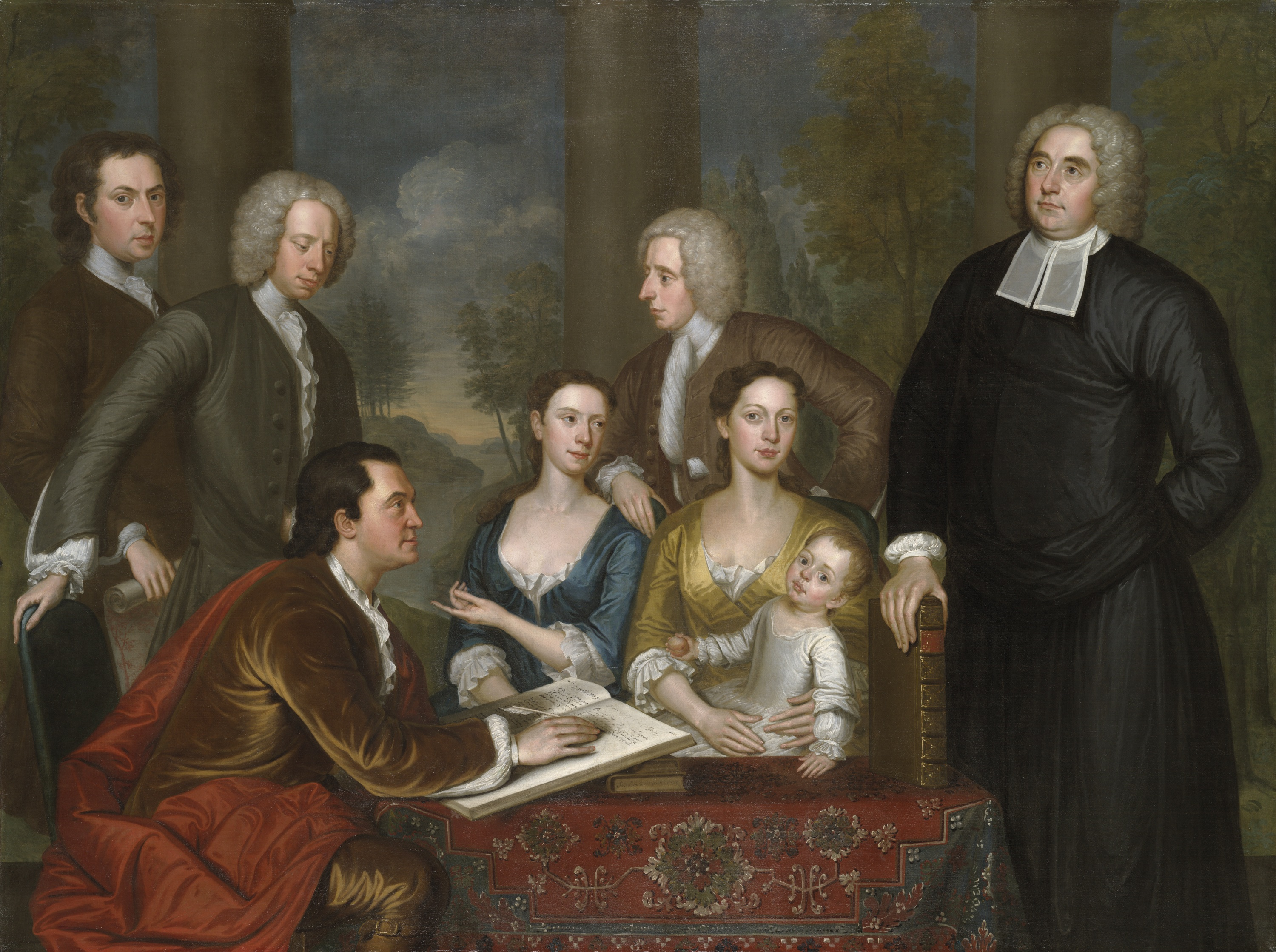
The Bermuda Group (Dean Berkeley and His Entourage) (1728–1739)

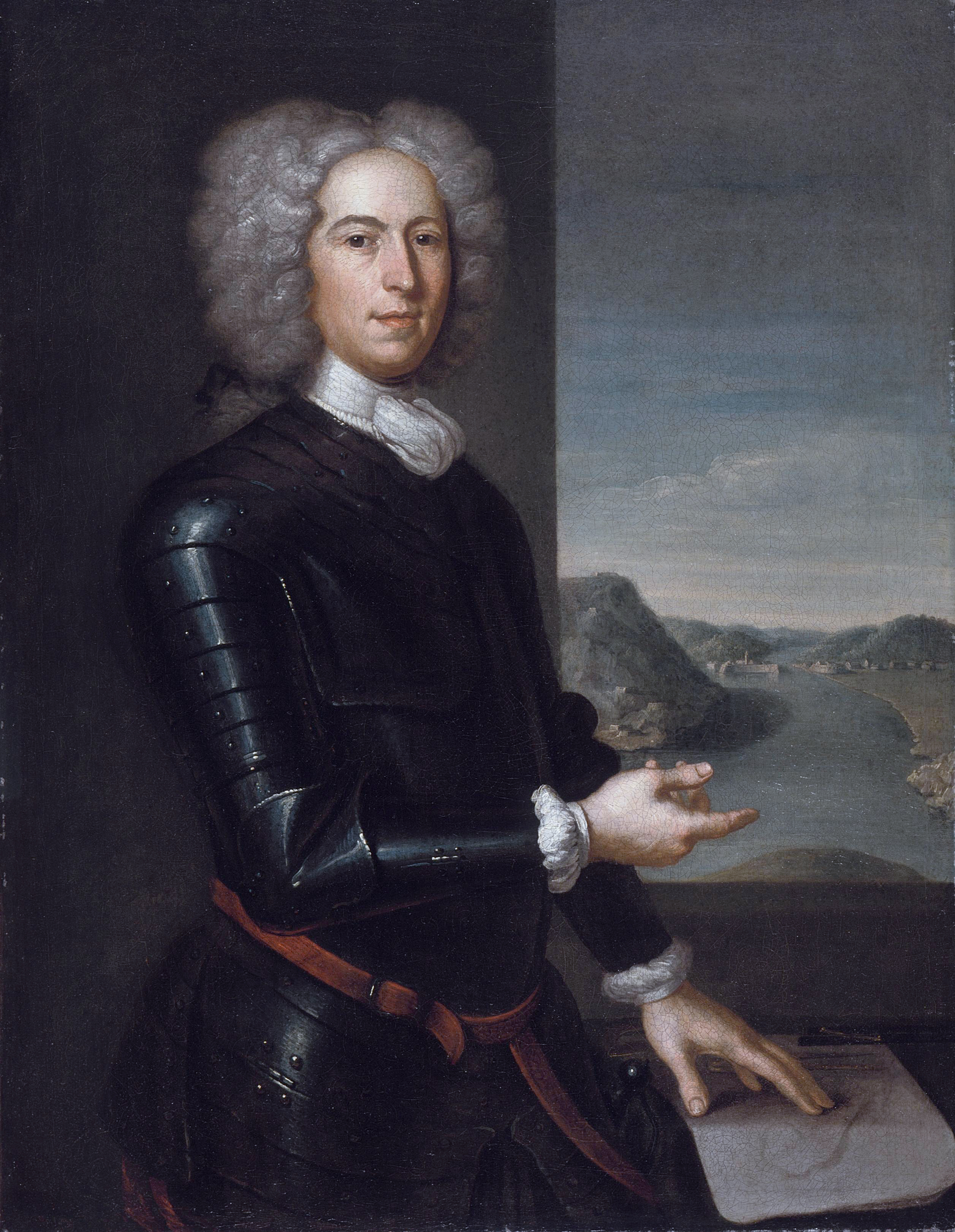
Portrait of Paul Mascarene (1729)

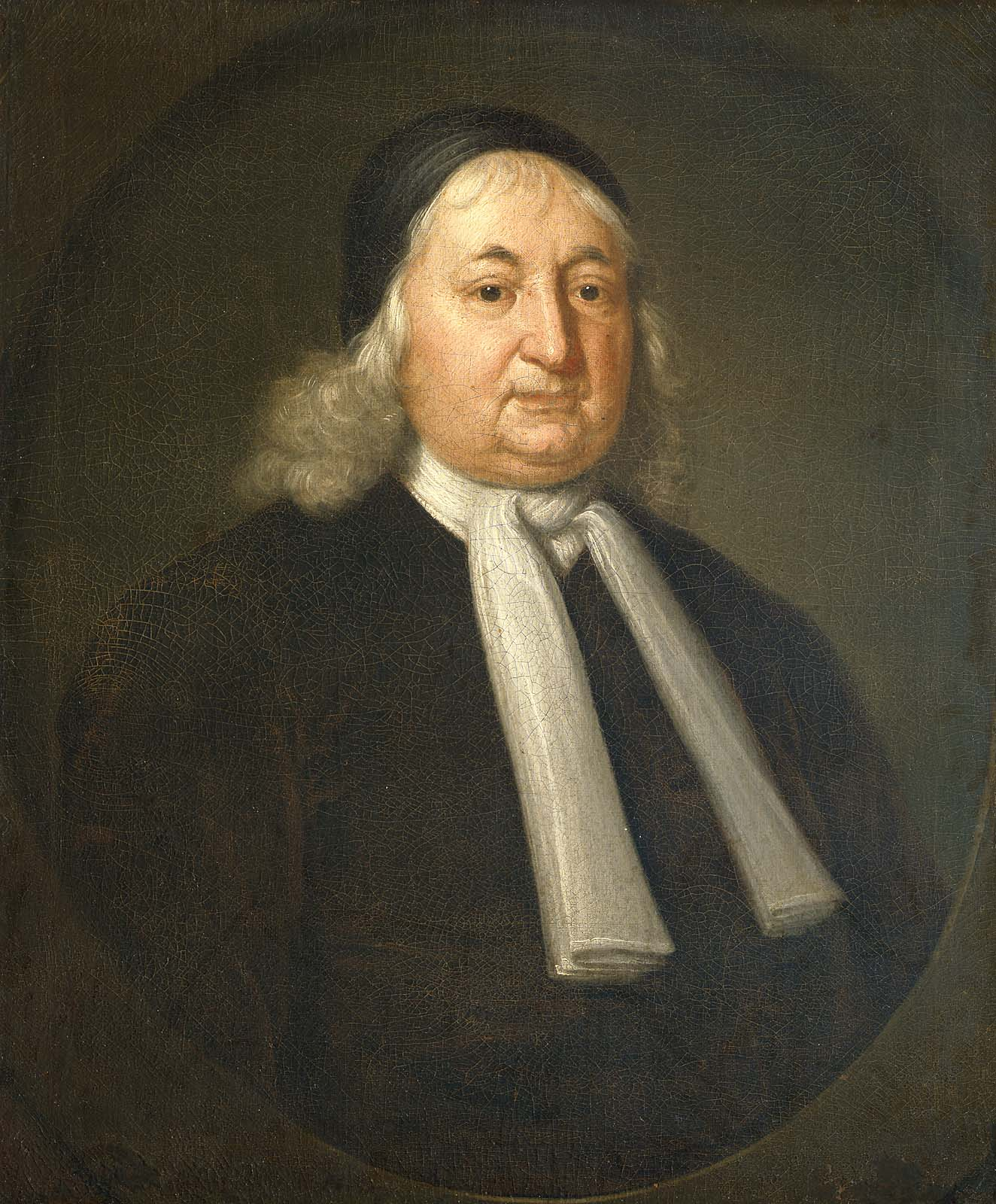
Judge Samuel Sewall (1729)

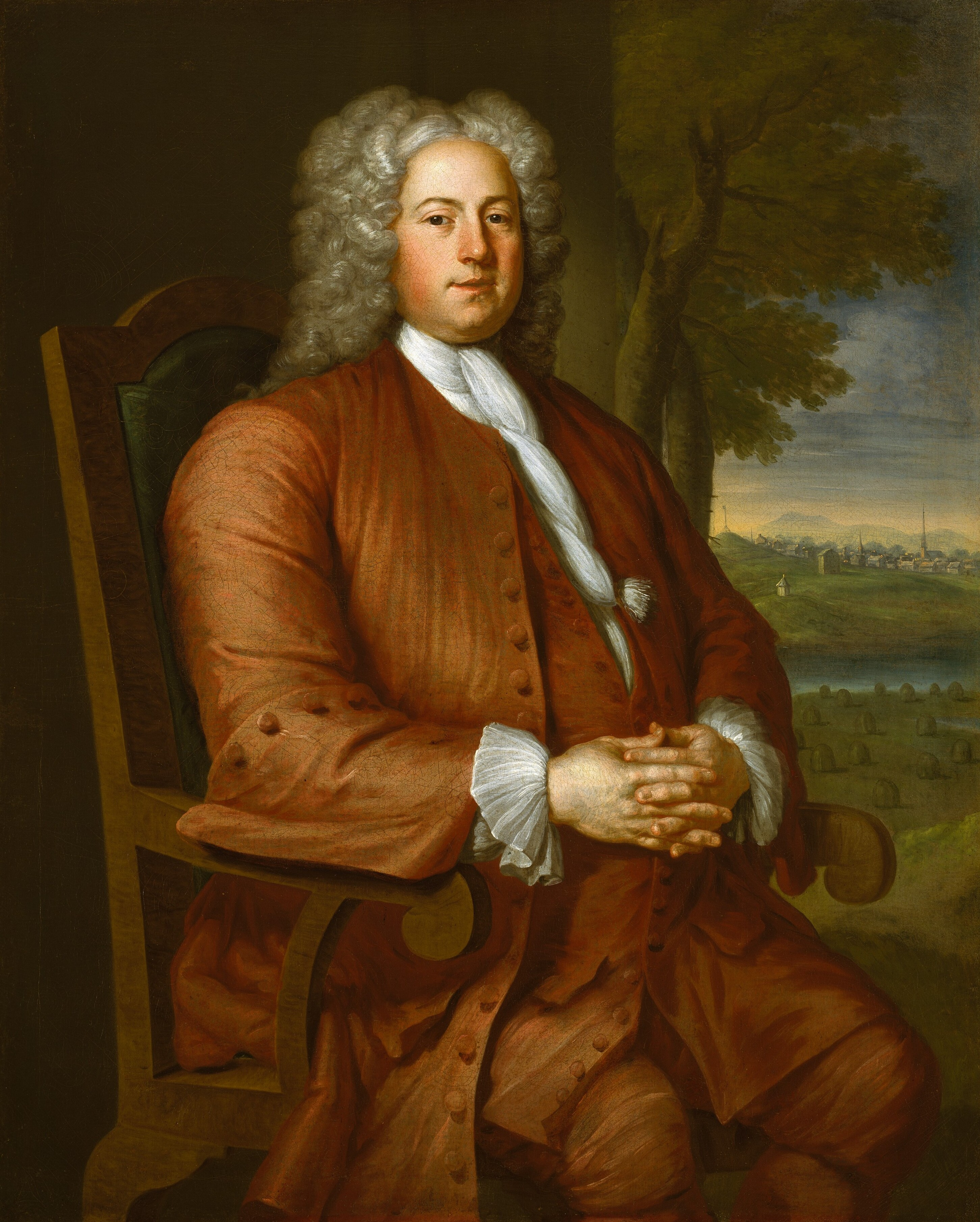
Francis Brinley (c. 1729)

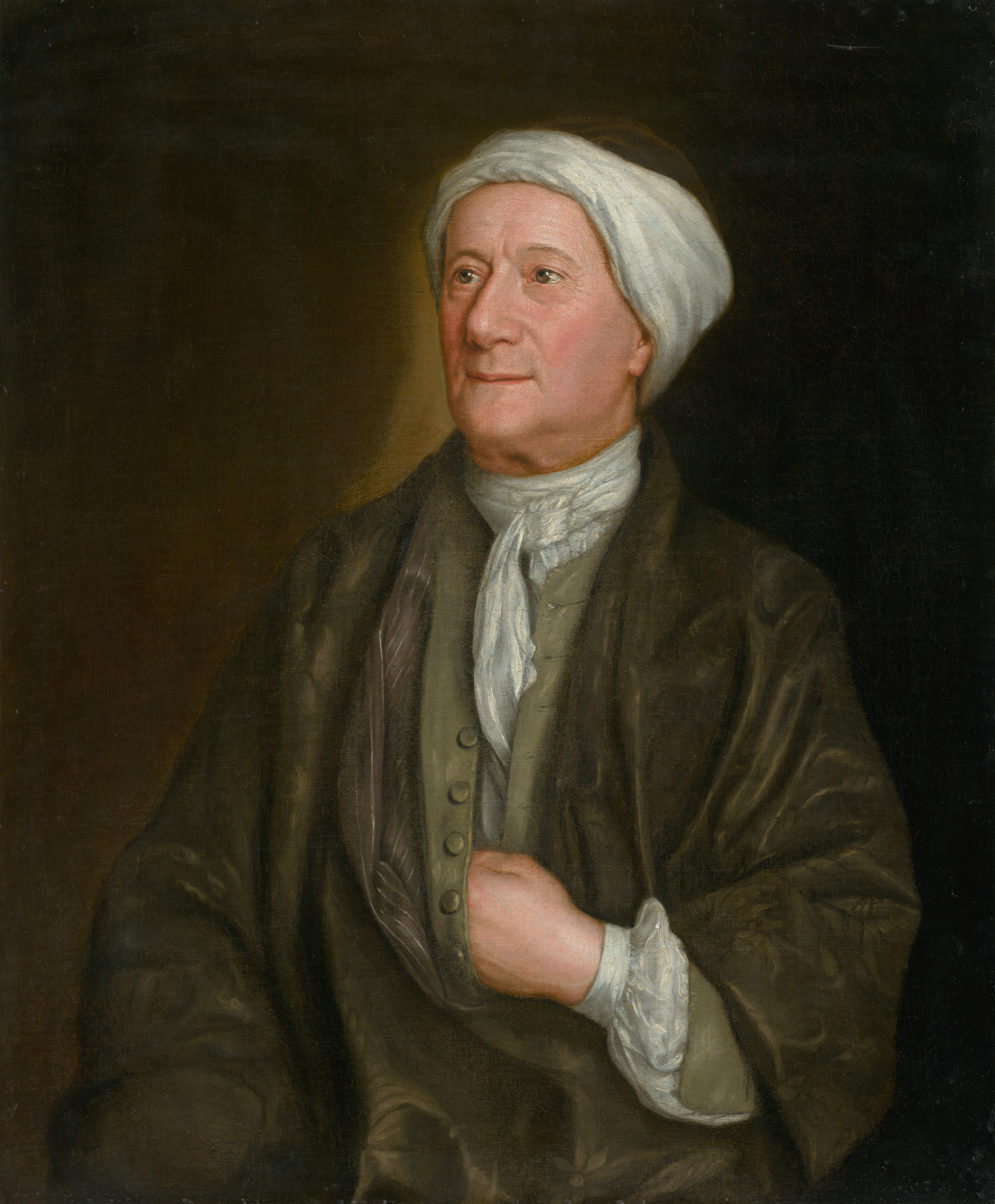
Portrait of a Man in a Dressing Gown (1730)

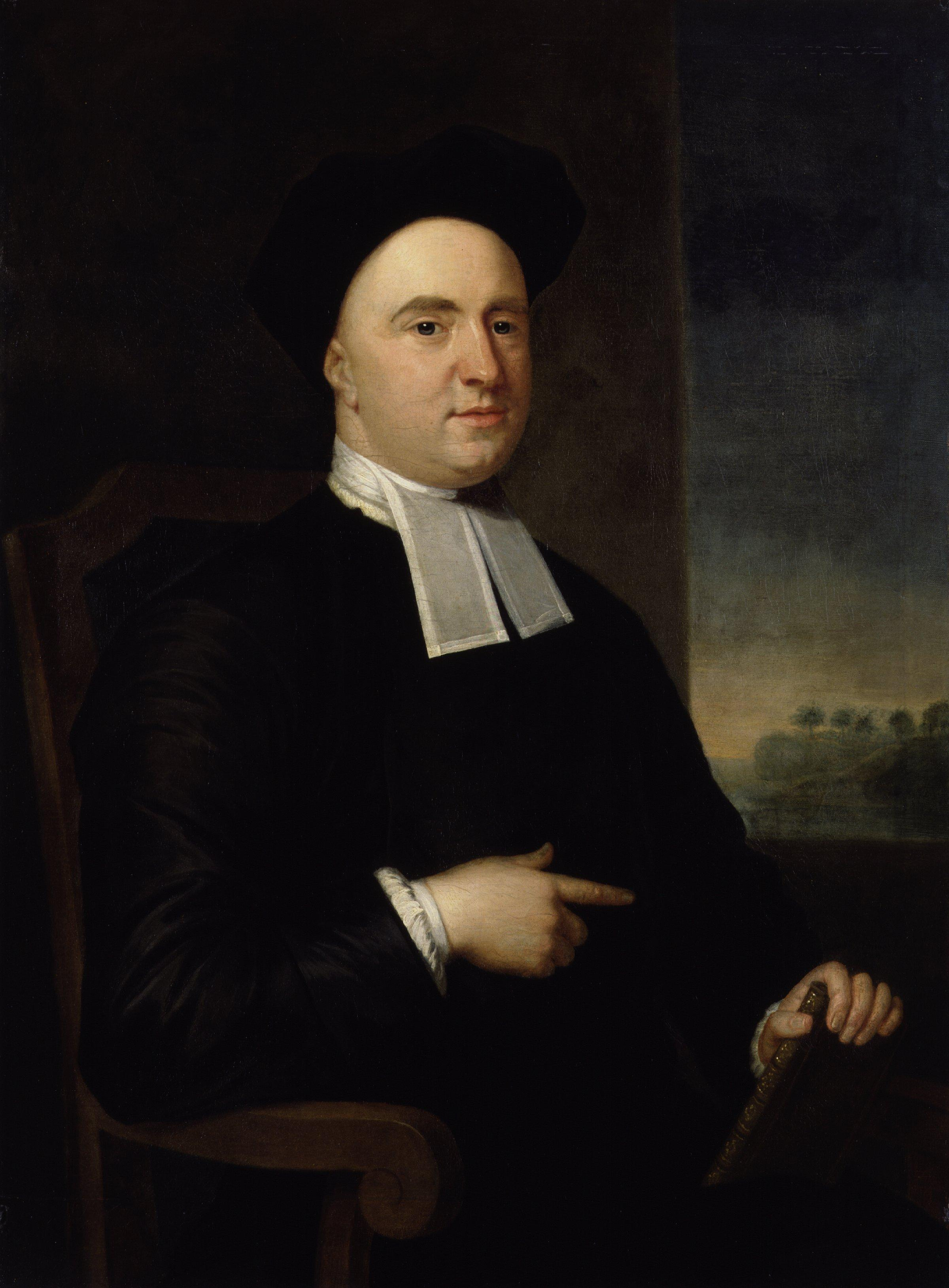
Portrait of George Berkeley (1730)

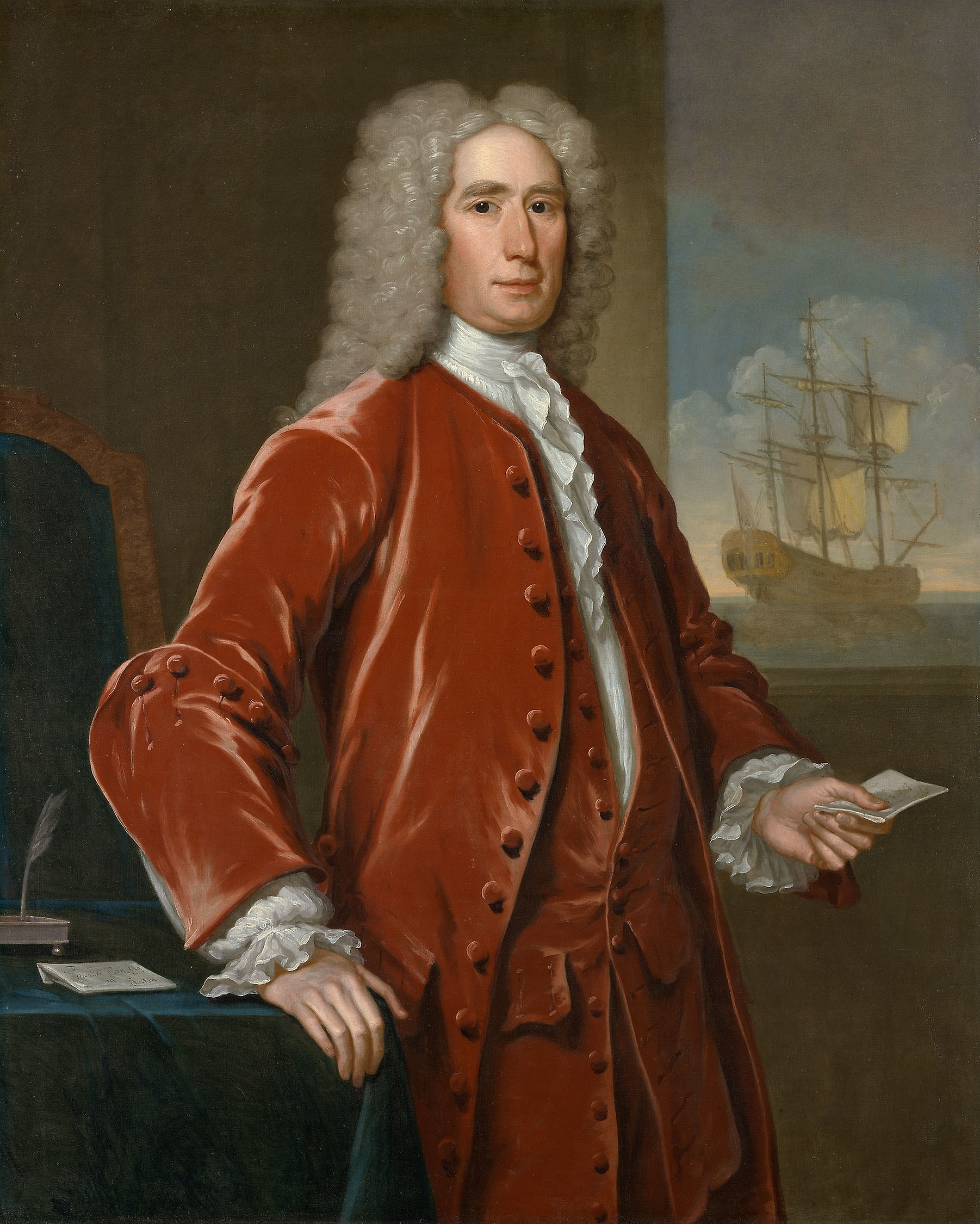
Richard Bill (1733)

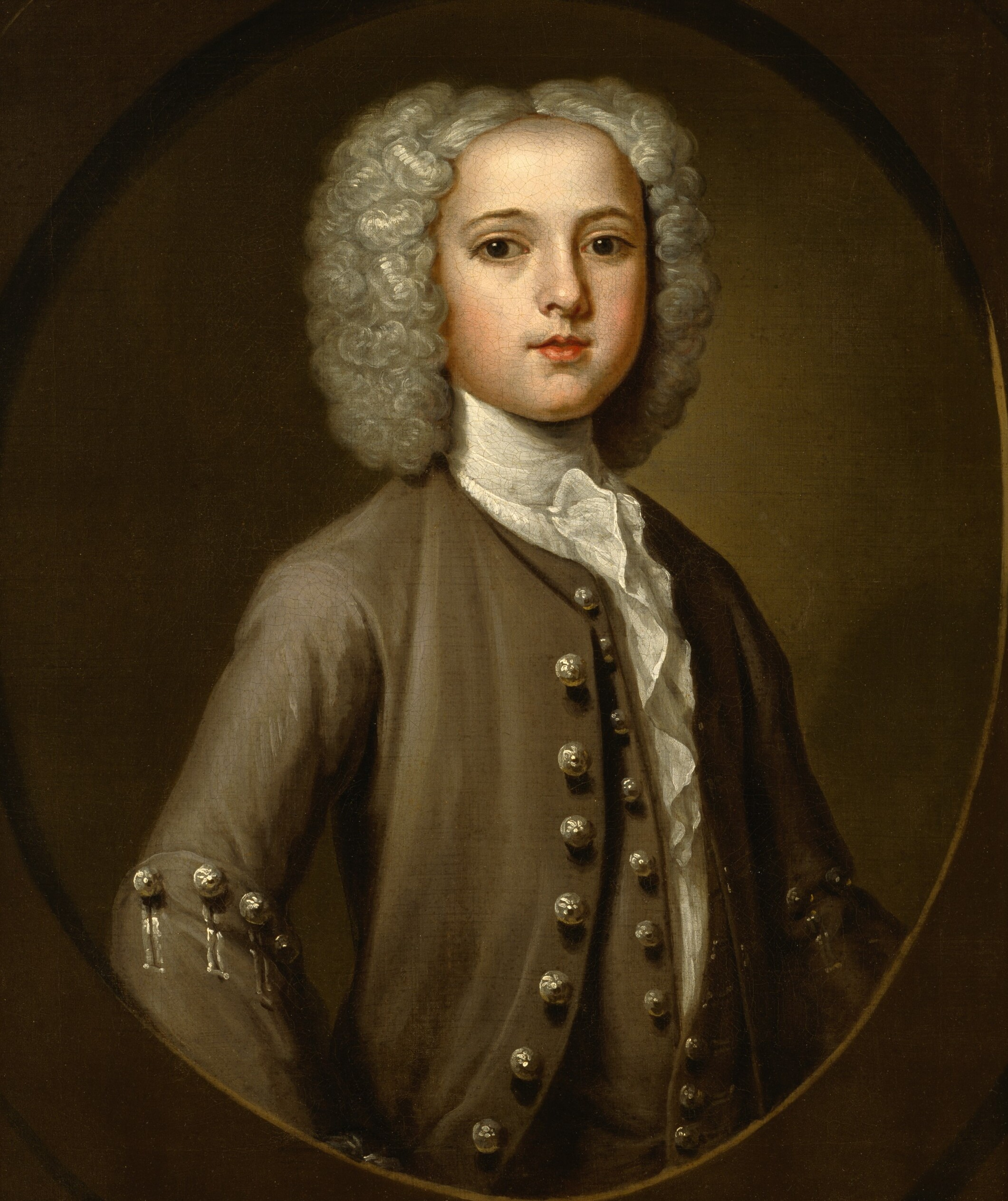
Portrait of Samuel Pemberton (1734)

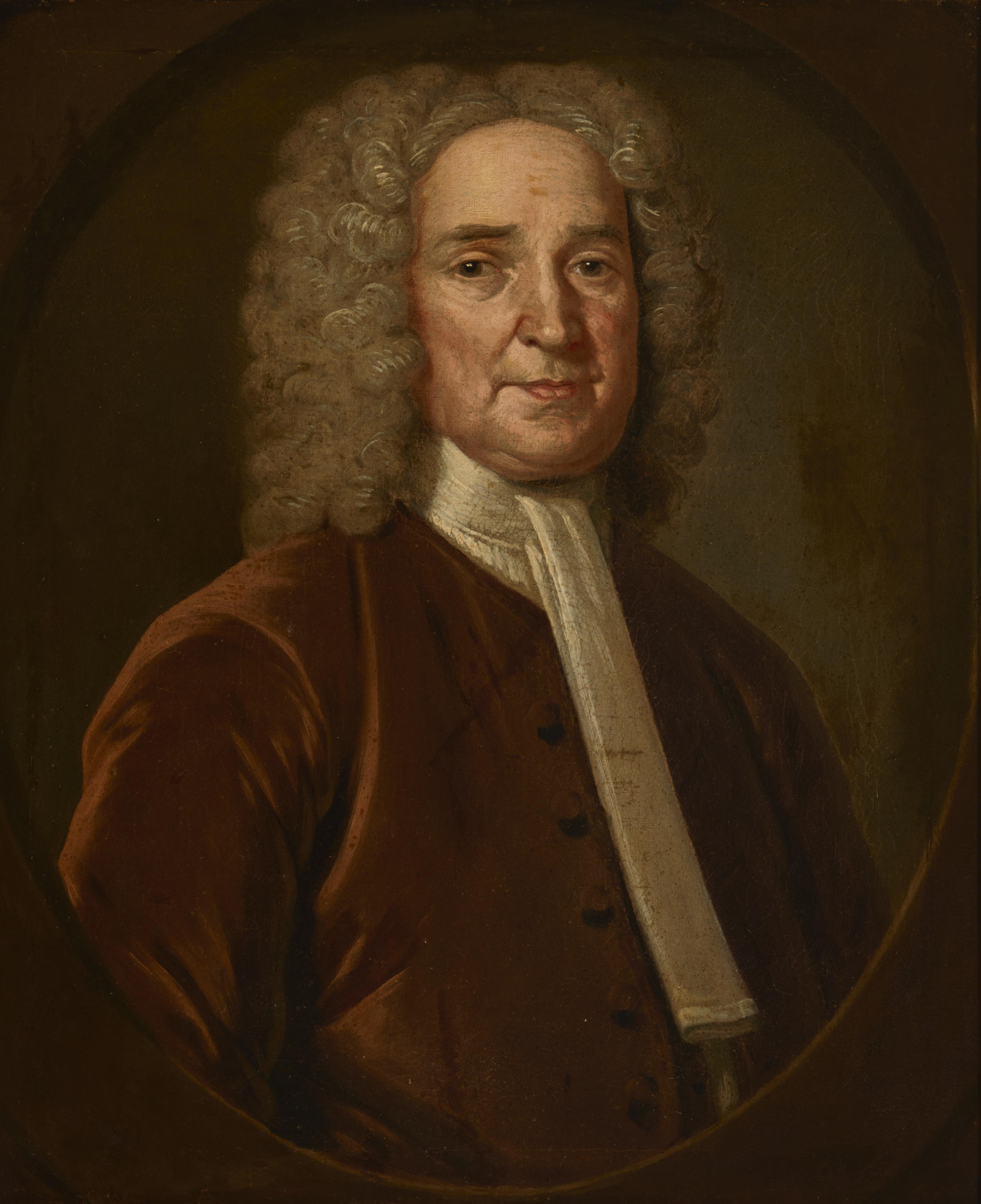
The Rev. John Cotton (1735)

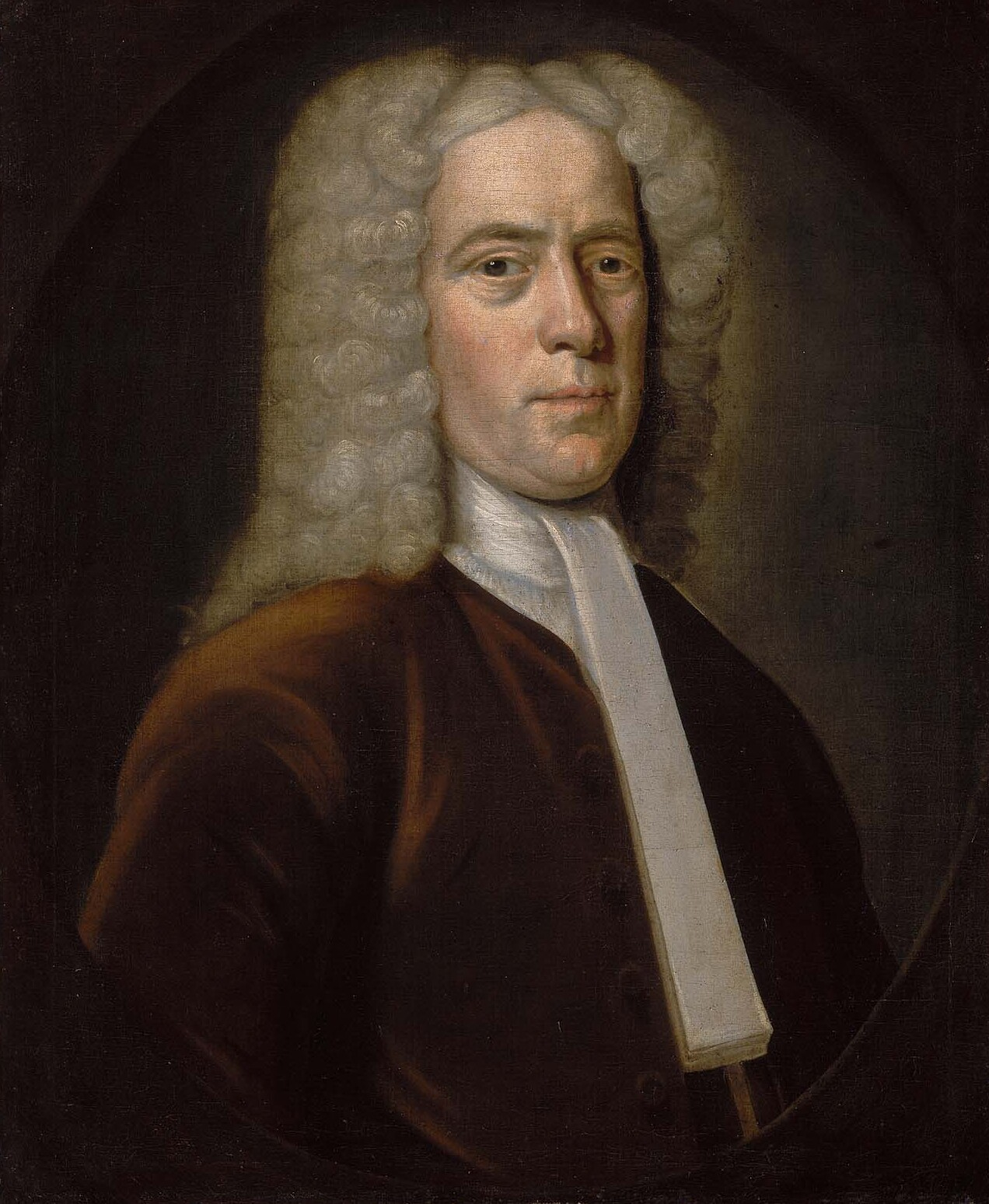
Judge Edmund Quincy (1737)

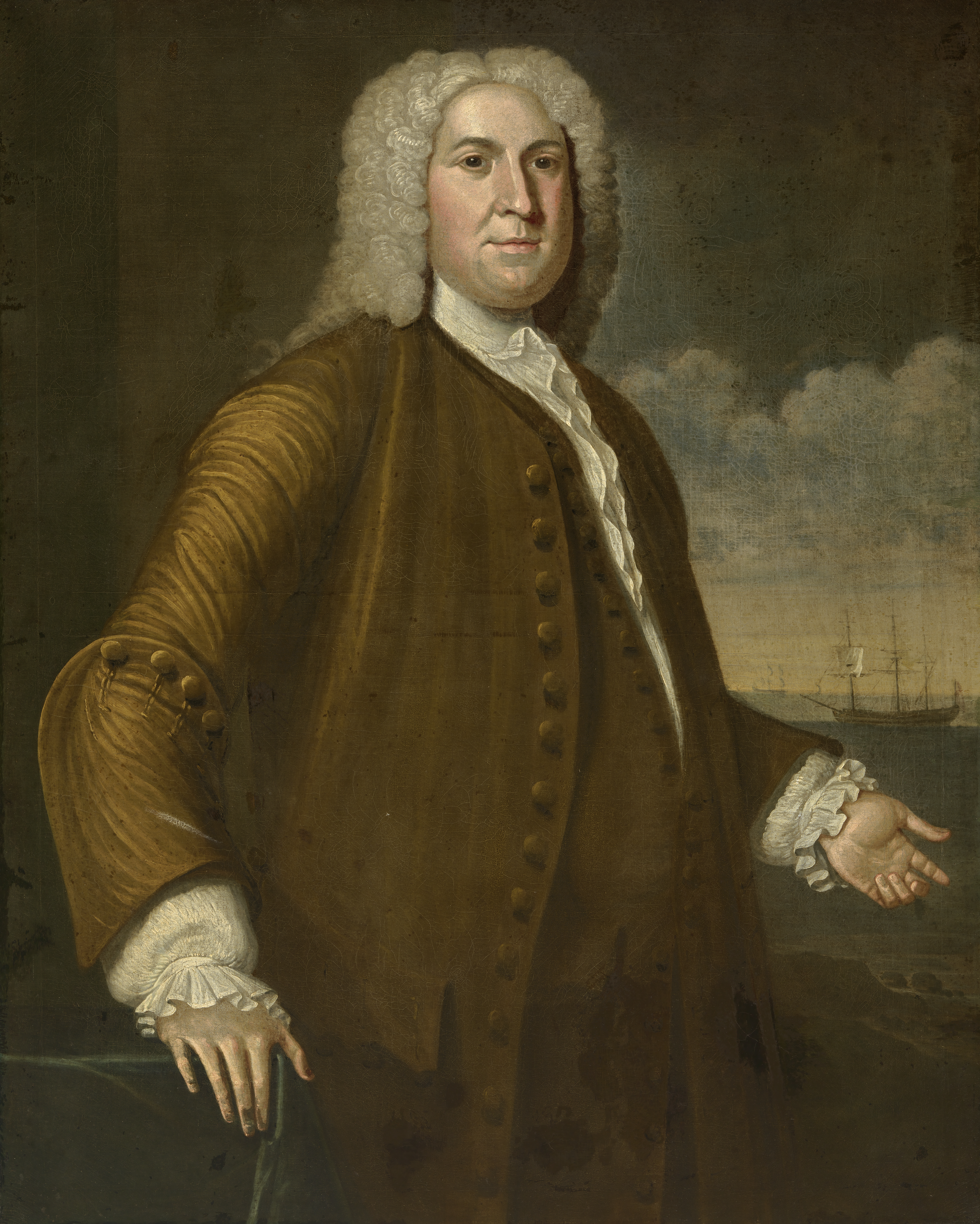
Peter Faneuil (c. 1742)
