= Joseph Hills (Massachusetts) =

Colonial Massachusetts official

Joseph R. Hills Sr.
- An engraving of Joseph Hills’ property c. 1680s

Magistrate for Middlesex County
- In office 1665–1669

5th Speaker of the House of Deputies
- In office 1647–1647

Member of the Massachusetts House of Deputies
- In office 1667–1667
- In office 1643–1656
- In office 1638–1641

Personal details
- Born: 3 March 1602 Essex, Kingdom of England
- Died: 5 February 1688 (aged 85) Newbury, Essex County, Massachusetts Bay Colony
- Spouse(s): Rose Clarke; Hannah Smith; Helen Atkinson; Anne Hills
- Children: 17, including Joseph Hills Jr.
- Relatives: Hills family
- Occupation: settler, militia officer, politician
- Known for: 1st generation patriarch of the Hills family, and founder of Malden, Massachusetts
- Nickname: Joseph Hills of Malden

Military service
- Rank: Captain

Captain Joseph Ralph Hills Sr. was an English-American politician and settler of Massachusetts in the seventeenth century. He served several political roles in the colony, including Speaker of the House of Deputies.

== Early life & Family ==
Joseph Hills was born in 1602 to George Hill and Mary Symonds.He had four wives in his life.

== Immigration & Political Career ==
Joseph Hills immigrated to Massachusetts Bay Colony in 1638 and started serving in the Massachusetts House of Deputies. He would go on to be the selectman of Malden and was also Speaker of the House of Deputies as well as magistrate for Middlesex County and a captain in the local militia.

== Later life & Legacy ==
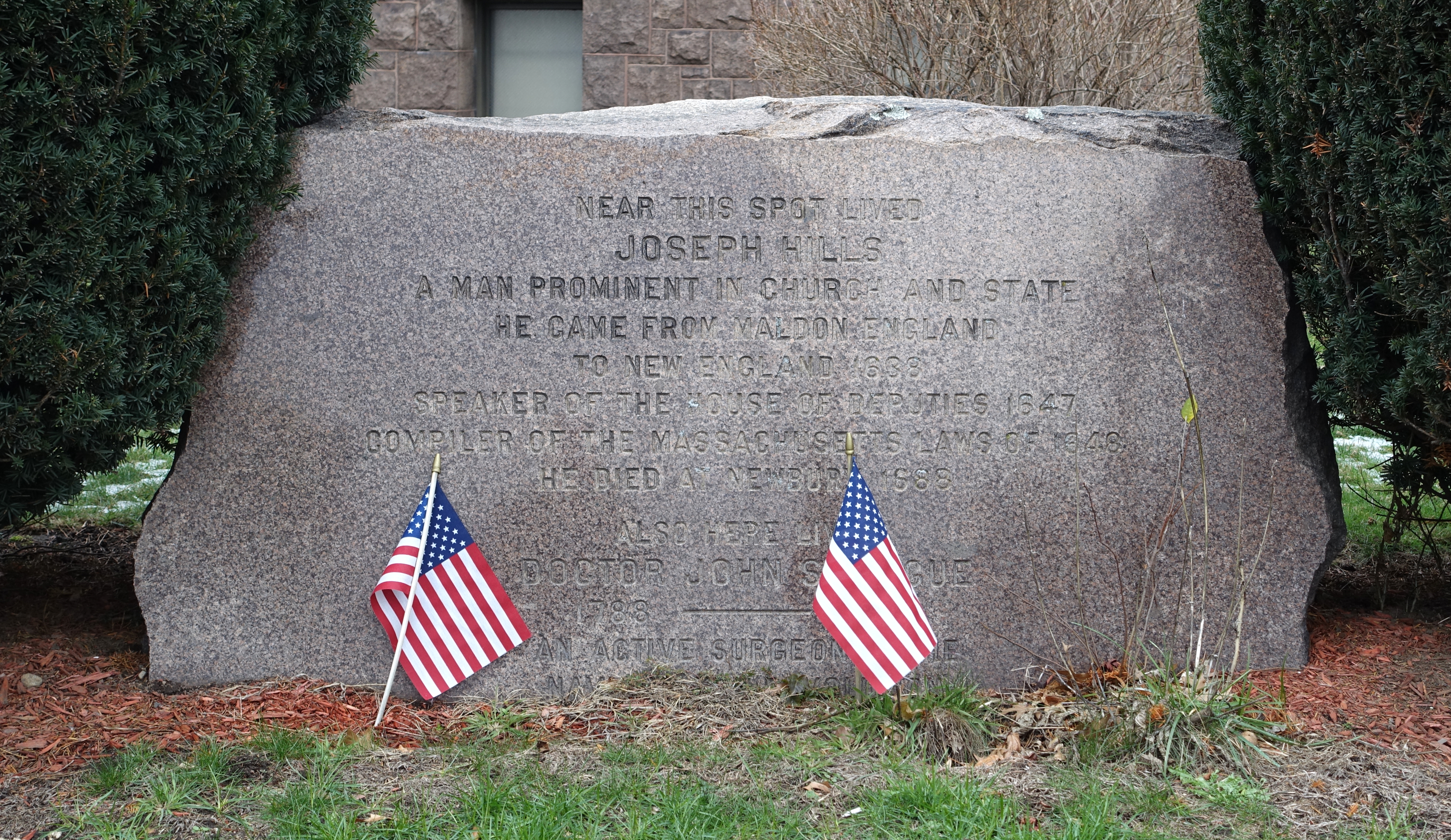
Joseph Hills Historic Marker in Malden

Joseph Hills Sr. died in 1688 at the age of 86.
