= Nehemiah Jewett =

Nehemiah Jewett (6 April 1643 – 1 January 1720) was an American colonial politician and the Speaker of the Massachusetts House of Representatives for three years.

== Biography ==
Nehemiah Jewett was born in Rowley, Massachusetts to Joseph Jewett, who immigrated to Massachusetts from England and represented Rowley as a representative on five occasions. Nehemiah Jewett became a noticeable figure in Essex County, Massachusetts by 1675 when much of the local legal transactions were written by him.

In 1689, he was elected to represent Rowley at the Massachusetts General Court for the first time. He was reelected to serve Rowley as a delegate for fourteen more years between 1689 and his death. From 1693 to 1694 and in 1701, he served as the Speaker of the House. During his tenure he compensated those damaged by the Salem witch trials. In 1711 and 1712, he was Justice of the Session Court.
