= John Saffin =

English-born merchant, politician, judge, and poet

John Saffin (November 1626 – 29 July 1710) was an English-born merchant, politician, judge, and poet. He is best known for the work A Brief and Candid Answer, which was written in response to Samuel Sewall's The Selling of Joseph, and for a small collection of poetry, most of which was not published until the 20th century. Literary historian Harrison Meserole ranks Saffin as "seventh or eighth" among colonial American poets.

== Early life ==
Coat of Arms of John Saffin

There has been much historical confusion about John Saffin's date and place of birth, and of the date of his migration to New England. Many early histories, often accepted by later writers, have placed his birth and family origin as Somerset, England, while others have claimed Exeter in Devon as his birthplace. Dates of birth in the early 1630s were commonly cited, and numerous dates have been ascribed to his arrival in the New World. In 1967 genealogical historian Alyce Sands wrote that Saffin himself claimed in 1658 to the son of Simon Saffin of Exeter, and found in Exeter a baptismal record for John Saffin dated 22 November 1626. Exeter records also show that his father Simon died in January 1633/4. When exactly, and with whom (for he was not accompanied by his mother), the boy came to North America is unclear; he may have been a ward of Plymouth Colony leader Edward Winslow (who travelled frequently between Plymouth and England), or he may have travelled with relatives of his mother, Grace (Garrett) Saffin. Garretts settled in the Rehoboth area, to which Saffin moved later in life.

Upon his arrival Saffin is known to have eventually settled in Scituate, in the northeastern part of Plymouth Colony. There he would have been educated by Charles Chauncy, the future President of Harvard. In 1654 he moved to Virginia, where he spent three years, establishing a merchant trade and eventually acquiring some property.

In 1658 Saffin married Marie Willett, daughter of Thomas Willett (a leading Plymouth land owner and developer), in Boston. He made a second trip to Virginia in 1659. By 1660 the couple had settled Boston; before her death by smallpox in 1678 they had eight children, all of whom died young. The loss of these children prompted the writing of some of his elegies, which are among his better known poetic works. Saffin and Willett went on to become frequent business partners. Not long after Marie's death, Saffin married Elizabeth Lidgett, widow of a Boston merchant. She was frequently bed-ridden with illness, and after her death he married Rebecca Lee in 1687; she was the daughter of the Anglican minister Samuel Lee who had arrived in Boston to establish the Church of England. The last relationship was apparently troubled by religious or personal differences with his in-laws, and the couple was separated for many years.

== Business ==
The trade Saffin engaged in was fairly typical: lumber and fish from New England were shipped to Virginia, and tobacco and hides were sent north. He is known to have been part owner of a ship involved in the direct shipment (and illegal smuggling) of slaves from Africa directly to Massachusetts, and was active in the direct shipment of African slaves to Virginia. His merchant activities made him one of the wealthiest men in Massachusetts. He also owned several slaves as well.

King Philip's War, fought in the late 1670s, resulted in the conquering of Indian territories on the eastern shore of Narragansett Bay. In 1680 the area around Mount Hope was awarded to the Plymouth Colony, which promptly sold it to a consortium of Plymouth men, including Saffin, the Indian fighter Benjamin Church. This tract became what is now Swansea, Massachusetts, Bristol, Rhode Island, and all or part of other nearby communities. Saffin was also a significant investor in the Atherton Trading Company (named after Humphrey Atherton), whose partners included many of the leading merchants and politicians of both Massachusetts and Plymouth. The company invested principally in lands now in southern Rhode Island, but had interests all over southern New England. Saffin was active in promoting development of these lands, promoting and signing an agreement in 1686 for the establishment of Kingston, Rhode Island by Huguenot refugees. The area was the subject of jurisdictional disputes between Massachusetts, Rhode Island and Connecticut, and Saffin, who had a reputation for his litigious tendencies, was involved in court actions central to the dispute. In 1679 a Rhode Island court convicted him of attempting to uphold a foreign jurisdiction (in this case, that of Connecticut) over the disputed land. Rhode Island confiscated his titles, and he spent some time in prison. Saffin received revenge when in 1687 Joseph Dudley, also an Atherton Trading Company principal and then president of the Dominion of New England, restored his claim.

== Judicial and political career ==
In Boston Saffin served for several years in the colonial assembly of the Massachusetts Bay Colony. He served as the speaker of that colony's assembly in 1684, the year in which the colonial charter was revoked. With the arrival of Joseph Dudley in 1686 and the establishment of the Dominion of New England, Saffin moved to Bristol (then part of the Plymouth Colony, now part of Rhode Island) in 1687. Following the Glorious Revolution in England in 1688, there was a revolt against the Dominion rule of Andros; Saffin sided with the rebels, and sat on the Plymouth Colony councils during the interregnum years from 1689 to 1692. This stance is likely responsible for a political estrangement between him and Dudley, who was among those imprisoned and sent to England.

In 1692, when the Province of Massachusetts Bay was chartered, Saffin was made a judge of the court of common pleas for Bristol County. He served on the governor's councils of the province from 1693 to 1702.

== The case of Adam ==
Cowardly and cruel are those Blacks Innate
Prone to Revenge, Imp of inveterate hate
He that exasperates them, soon espies
Mischief and Murder in their very eyes.
Libidinous, Deceitful, False, and Rude
The Spume Issue of Ingratitude
The Premises consider'd, all may tell
How near good Joseph they are Parallel

—Racist couplet by Saffin

Saffin was well known for his pugnacious style, because of which he often ended up in court as a litigant. The most notorious of these disputes involved a black indentured servant named Adam that Saffin had hired out on a seven-year contract in 1694. When the term was coming to an end in 1701 it became clear that Saffin, who like many of the time held racist views, was not going to honour its terms, and maintain Adam in servitude. The issue prompted Samuel Sewall to write The Selling of Joseph in 1700, a pamphlet that argued generally against slavery. In addition to rejoinders to Sewall in verse, he published A Brief and Candid Answer, in which he sought to answer Sewall's charges and also catalogued his grievances against Adam. Events, however, soon became litigious, because Adam escaped from the farm on which he was working in March 1701. Sewall and Saffin had a confrontation at Sewall's house, in which an agreement was made between them that a case for Saffin's claim to possession of Adam would be heard in Bristol County.

On 1 August 1701, Saffin convinced the governor's council to appoint him to the Superior Court of Judicature, the province's highest court, in the wake of the passing of Chief Justice and Acting Governor William Stoughton. The standard process for hearing cases at that time was that one or more of the superior court justices would ride circuit to hear cases in conjunction with lower court judges. Saffin consequently was on the bench in Bristol County when Adam's case came up. He furthermore may have tampered with the jury; it is alleged that he bribed the foreman to put one of his tenants on the panel.

The court heard evidence claiming that Adam had failed to "chearfully quietly and industriously" fulfil the terms of the indenture, and he was found guilty. The verdict was appealed at the instigation of Sewall, and Adam also filed a countersuit against Saffin for his freedom. Saffin's case was eventually stayed until Adam's was heard in 1703. In the meantime, Joseph Dudley, newly appointed governor, refused to reappoint Saffin to the high court in 1702, noting others "might have served the Queen better than they did". He also vetoed Saffin's appointment to the governor's council after Saffin used his position on that seat to renew his petition for custody of Adam. The full superior court heard the case November 1703, and ruled decisively in favour of Adam's freedom.

Saffin died at Bristol on 29 July 1710, and was buried in Boston.

== Bibliography ==
- A Brief and Candid Answer to a Late Printed Sheet, Entituled, The Selling Joseph. 1701.
- John Saffin, His Book (1665–1708): A Collection of Various Matters of Divinity, Law, & State Affairs Epitomiz'd Both in Verse and Prose. New York: Harbor Press. 1928. OCLC 295759. First publication of Saffin's poetry.

== Notes ==
Legal offices
Preceded by Wait Winthrop	Associate Justice of the Massachusetts Superior Court of Judicature; 1701–1702	Succeeded by John Hathorne
