= George Cooke (Massachusetts politician) =

American colonial politician

George Cooke (died in 1652) was an American colonial politician and the Speaker of the Massachusetts House of Representatives in 1645.

== Biography ==
Coat of Arms of George Cooke

George Cooke journeyed from England with Thomas Shepard and Roger Harlakenden in 1635. He eventually settled in Cambridge, Massachusetts, eventually becoming selectman, deputy, and Speaker of the Massachusetts House of Representatives during his political life. He returned to England after his tenure as speaker and joined Oliver Cromwell's army, rising to the rank of colonel before he was killed in 1652 fighting against the Irish.
