= William Bond (Massachusetts politician) =

1st Speaker of the Massachusetts Province House of Representatives
- In office 1692–1692
- Preceded by: Penn Townsend
- In office 1693–1693
- Succeeded by: Nehemiah Jewett
- In office 1695–1695
- Succeeded by: Penn Townsend

Personal details
- Born: 1625 England
- Died: 1695 (aged 69–70) Massachusetts

William Bond (September 8, 1625 – December 14, 1695) was the first Speaker of the Massachusetts Province House of Representatives in 1692 following unification of Plymouth Colony and Massachusetts Bay Colony in 1691, he was the representative for Watertown a position he would be elected to several times after.

== Early life ==
Bond was baptized September 8, 1625 in Bury St. Edmunds, Suffolk, England, the son of Thomas Bond. He may have come to the American colonies in 1630 with his aunt Elizabeth, the wife of Deacon Ephraim Child, or he may have come at a later date. (See Robert Charles Anderson, The Great Migration Begins, Immigrants to New England, 1620–1633, 3 vols. (Boston: New England Historic Genealogical Society, 1995), 2098). In 1649 he married Sarah Biscoe, daughter of tanner Nathanial Biscoe, and were the parents of seven children.

== Public service ==
Bond became a leading citizen of Massachusetts Bay, serving as a selectman and town clerk of Watertown, captain of the militia, Justice of the Peace, and member of the Council of Safety.

=== Speaker of the House ===
Following the unification of Massachusetts Bay and Plymouth in 1691 by the Second Royal Charter, William became the first speaker, holding the office in 1692-1693 and 1695.

== Belmont ==
Coat of Arms of William Bond

The Bond farm was purchased from some of William Bond's descendants by China merchant John Perkins Cushing. Cushing used it as his estate where he built a mansion which he named Belmont. Cushing held several widely publicized events there. When the northern part of Watertown seceded they chose to name the town Belmont, Massachusetts after Cushing's estate there.
