= Thomas Oakes (representative) =

American politician

Thomas Oakes (18 June 1644 – 15 July 1719) was a physician and politician in New England, speaker of the Massachusetts House of Representatives.

He was born in Cambridge, Massachusetts, on 18 June 1644, brother of Urian Oakes, and graduated at Harvard College in 1662. He subsequently studied medicine in London, and obtained some reputation as a physician. He was elected a representative after the Glorious Revolution and the expulsion of Sir Edmund Andros in 1689, and was chosen speaker. In 1690 he was chosen assistant. In that year he went to England with Elisha Cooke to represent the interests of the colonists in the matter of a new charter. He was again chosen speaker to the House of Representatives in 1705. He died at Easthaven in Massachusetts on 15 July 1719, leaving two sons. He is buried with his son Ebanezer, also graduated Harvard, at the old burial ground in Wellfleet*, Massachusetts off Harrison Street, also the site of the first meeting house. His memorial stone can be seen and lists also an infant.

(*First Burial Ground Known today as"the Chequesset Neck Cemetery","the Taylor HillCemetery", and "the Indian Cemetery". Originally a family burial ground for the Doane family, est. c. 1716. This is also the site of the First Meeting House 1723-1735. For many years this was the only burial ground for both English and Christianized Indians in this part of Billingsgate, now known as Wellfleet)

Dr. Thomas Oakes was the doctor who was called to examine the hysterical children in Boston. He was reportedly so perplexed with their maladies that he said the only cause could be "hellish witchcraft". It was this misdiagnosis that led to the start of the Salem witch trials.
