= Daniel Denison (colonist) =

- Denison's coat of arms

Member of the Council of Assistants
- In office 1654–1682

Speaker of the Massachusetts General Court
- In office 1651–1652
- Preceded by: Daniel Gookin
- Succeeded by: Humphrey Atherton
- In office 1649–1649
- Preceded by: Richard Russell
- Succeeded by: William Hawthorne

Member of the Massachusetts General Court for Ipswich
- In office 1640–1652
- In office 1635–1637

Personal details
- Born: c. 1612; England
- Died: September 20, 1682 (aged 69–70); Ipswich, Massachusetts

Military service
- Rank: Major General
- Commands: Massachusetts Militia
- Battles/wars: King Phillip's War

Major-General Daniel Denison (c. 1612 – September 20, 1682) was an English-born military officer and politician who spent the majority of his life in the Massachusetts Bay Colony.

== Early life ==
He was the son of William Denison, an early settler of Roxbury, Massachusetts. He arrived in Roxbury with his parents in 1631, likely with the "apostle" Puritan Minister John Eliot, on the ship Lyon. Daniel Denison moved away in 1633 to become one of the first settlers of Cambridge. He married Patience Dudley, the daughter of Massachusetts Governor Thomas Dudley. He became a freeman of Cambridge on April 1, 1634, and served on the first Constable's committee to execute land allocation in the establishment of Cambridge (so ordered Feb. 3, 1634). He moved to Ipswich in 1635 to take up leadership responsibilities in the defense of the colony, and to develop a career in governance.

== Career ==
In Ipswich he was elected deputy to the Massachusetts General Court in 1635–1637 and from 1640 to 1652. He was elected speaker of the General Court in 1649, 1651 and 1652. In 1643 the town of Ipswich granted him 200 acres of land.

He was captain of the first train band (militia company) of Ipswich in 1636. In 1644 he was chosen as the commander of the Essex Regiment of the Massachusetts Militia with the rank of sergeant major (equivalent to the modern rank of major). In 1653 he was appointed as sergeant major general (equivalent to the modern rank of major general) in command of the Massachusetts Militia.

In 1654 he was elected as one of the assistants on the Governor's Council and held that office until his death.

In May 1658 he was chosen by the General Court to codify the laws of the colony. As payment for this effort, he was granted one quarter of Block Island (now a part of Rhode Island).

In 1660 he was elected as a member of the Artillery Company of Massachusetts. He was elected for a one-year term as the Company's captain in June of the same year.

During King Philip's War in 1675 he was the commander of the Massachusetts Militia but was unable to serve in the field due to illness. Major Thomas Savage commanded the militia in his place.

He died in Ipswich on September 20, 1682, and is buried in the High Street Burial Ground in that town.

== Notes ==
- The Town of Roxbury, Thirty-fourth Report - Boston Records: Its memorable persons and places; its history and antiquities with numerous illustrations of its old landmarks and noted personages. Frances S. Drake (1905). Boston: Municipal Printing Company. [p. 50]. [Accessed in Local History Room, Watertown Free Public Library, Watertown, MA].
- Proprietors' Records of the Town of Cambridge, 1635-1829. (1896). Cambridge, MA: University Press. [p. 2.] Alt Title "The Register Book of the Lands and Houses in the "New Towne" and The Town of Cambridge with the Records of the Proprietors of the Common Lands". [Accessed in Local History Room, Watertown Free Public Library, Watertown, MA].
- Ipswich in the Massachusetts Bay Colony, 1633-1700. Waters (1905). Ipswich, MA: The Ipswich Historical Society. [p. 120-127]. [Accessed in Local History Room, Watertown Free Public Library, Watertown, MA].
- History of the Ancient and Honorable Artillery Company of Massachusetts. 1637-1888. Oliver Ayer Roberts. Boston. 1897. Volume 1. [pp. 191–192]. (Cited as Roberts.)
