= Hancock =

Hancock may refer to:

== Places ==
=== Places in the United States ===
- Hancock, Iowa
- Hancock, Maine
- Hancock, Maryland
- Hancock, Massachusetts
- Hancock, Michigan
- Hancock, Minnesota
- Hancock, Missouri
- Hancock, New Hampshire
  - Hancock (CDP), New Hampshire
- Hancock, New York, a town
  - Hancock (village), New York, in the town of Hancock
- Hancock, Austin, Texas, a neighborhood
- Hancock, Vermont
- Hancock (town), Wisconsin
  - Hancock, Wisconsin, a village within the town
- Hancock County (disambiguation), a list of counties in ten U.S. states
- Hancock Township (disambiguation)
- Mount Hancock (disambiguation)
- Hancock Park, Los Angeles, California

=== Facilities and structures ===
- Great North Museum: Hancock, formerly the Hancock Museum, a natural history museum in Newcastle upon Tyne, England
- John Hancock Center, a Chicago skyscraper owned by the financial company of the same name
- John Hancock Tower, a building in Boston, Massachusetts, also owned by the company
- Syracuse Hancock International Airport

== People ==
- Hancock (surname), with list of people with the surname

== Entertainment ==
- Hancock (film), a 2008 superhero film starring Will Smith
- Hancock's Half Hour, a British BBC radio and TV comedy programme, eventually shortened to Hancock
- Hancock (1963 TV series), a 1963 British ITV television series
- Hancock, a 1991 Screen One episode about Tony Hancock

== Other uses ==
- Hancock (programming language)
- John Hancock or simply Hancock, slang term in the US for a person's signature
- Hancock air whistle, a whistle intended for use on diesel locomotives
- John Hancock Financial, a US company
- USS Hancock, the name of several ships belonging to the United States Navy
