= USS John Hancock =

USS John Hancock may refer to:

- USS John Hancock (1850) was a steamship first authorized in 1850. She was sold in 1865.
- USS John Hancock (DD-981), was a Spruance-class destroyer, initiated in 1977 and retired in 2000.

== See also ==
- USS Hancock
- USS Lewis Hancock
