= Hancock Hill =

Hancock Hill may refer to:

- Hancock Hill (Indiana)
- Hancock Hill (Kansas)
- Hancock Hill (Worcester County, Massachusetts), Worcester County, Massachusetts
- Hancock Hill (Norfolk County, Massachusetts), Norfolk County, Massachusetts
- Hancock Hill (Mississippi)
- Hancock Hill (Oregon)
- Hancock Hill (Texas)
- Hancock Butte (Arizona)
- Hancock Knoll (Arizona)
- Hancock Knolls (Arizona)

== See also ==
- Mount Hancock (disambiguation), a list of various mountains
