= USS John Hancock (DD-981) =

Spruance-class destroyer

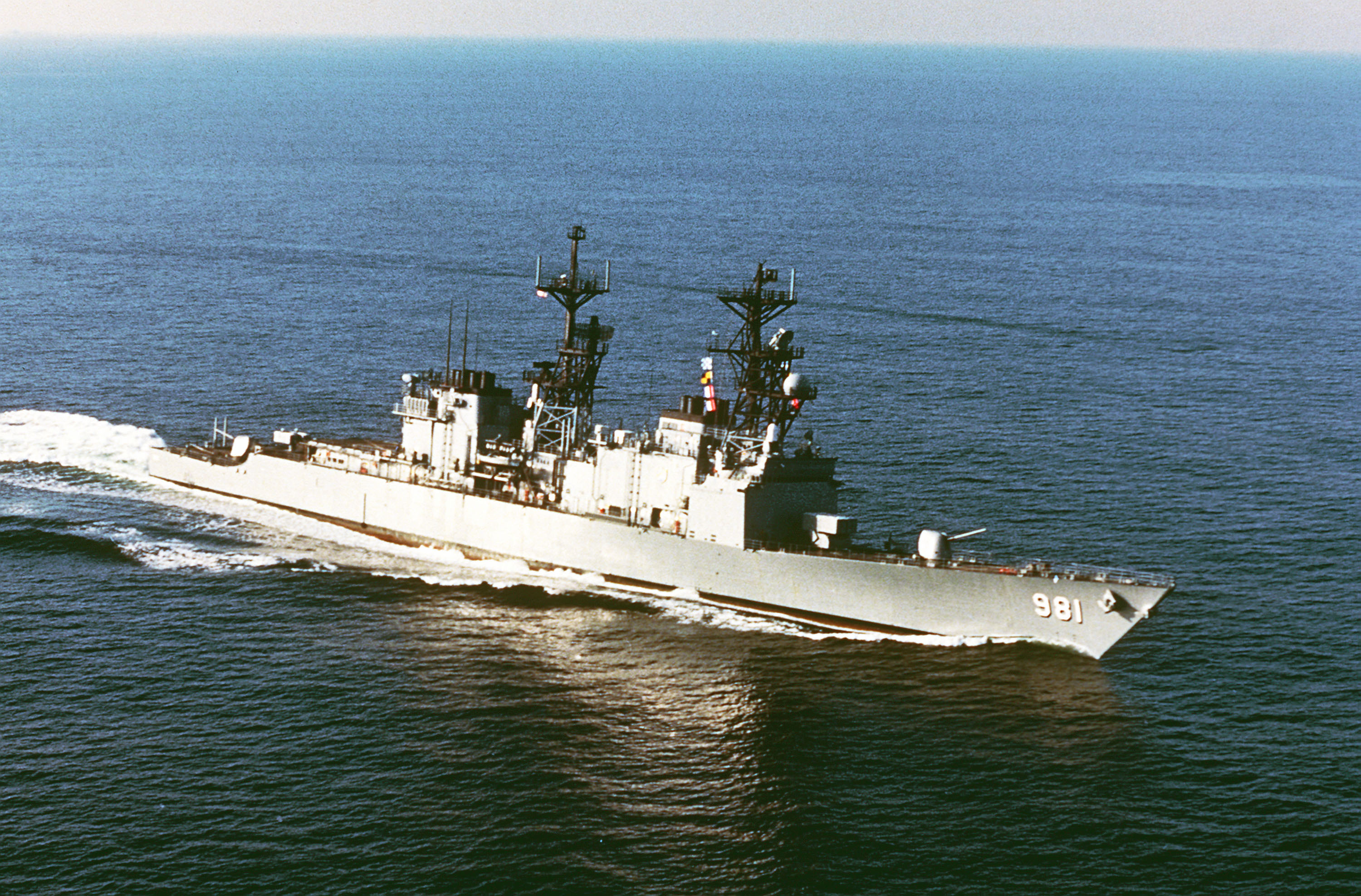
- USS John Hancock in 1983

History

United States
- Name: John Hancock
- Namesake: John Hancock
- Ordered: 15 January 1974
- Builder: Ingalls Shipbuilding
- Laid down: 16 January 1976
- Launched: 29 October 1977
- Acquired: 12 February 1979
- Commissioned: 10 March 1979
- Decommissioned: 16 October 2000
- Identification: Callsign: NLTT; Hull number: DD-981
- Motto: First for Freedom
- Fate: Scrapped, 28 April 2007
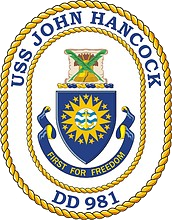
- Badge

General characteristics
- Class & type: Spruance-class destroyer
- Displacement: 8,040 long tons (8,170 t) full load
- Length: 529 ft (161 m) waterline; 563 ft (172 m) overall
- Beam: 55 ft (17 m)
- Draft: 29 ft (8.8 m)
- Installed power: 3 × 501-K17 generator sets (2,000 kW (2,700 hp) each)
- Propulsion: 4 × General Electric LM2500 gas turbines, 2 shafts, 80,000 shp (60 MW)
- Speed: 32.5 knots (60.2 km/h; 37.4 mph)
- Range: 6,000 nmi (11,000 km; 6,900 mi) at 20 knots (37 km/h; 23 mph)
- Complement: 19 officers, 315 enlisted
- Sensors & processing systems: AN/SPS-40 air search radar; AN/SPG-60 fire control radar; AN/SPS-55 surface search radar; AN/SPQ-9 gun fire control radar; Mark 23 TAS automatic detection and tracking radar; AN/SPS-65 missile fire control radar; AN/SQS-53 bow-mounted active sonar; AN/SQR-19 TACTAS towed array passive sonar; Naval Tactical Data System
- Electronic warfare & decoys: AN/SLQ-32 electronic warfare system; AN/SLQ-25 Nixie torpedo countermeasures; Mark 36 SRBOC decoy launching system; AN/SLQ-49 inflatable decoys
- Armament: 2 × 5 in (127 mm) 54 caliber Mark 45 dual purpose guns; 2 × 20 mm Phalanx CIWS Mark 15 guns; 1 × 8 cell ASROC launcher (removed); 1 × 8 cell NATO Sea Sparrow Mark 29 missile launcher; 2 × quadruple Harpoon missile canisters; 2 × Mark 32 triple 12.75 in (324 mm) torpedo tubes (Mk 46 torpedoes); 1 × 61 cell Mk 41 VLS launcher for Tomahawk missiles
- Aircraft carried: 2 × Sikorsky SH-60 Seahawk LAMPS III helicopters
- Aviation facilities: Flight deck and enclosed hangar for up to two medium-lift helicopters

USS John Hancock (DD-981), a Spruance-class destroyer, was the second ship of that name, and the sixth ship of the United States Navy to be named for Founding Father John Hancock (1737–1793), the President of the Continental Congress and first signer of the Declaration of Independence.

== History ==
John Hancock was laid down on 16 January 1976 by Ingalls Shipbuilding, in Pascagoula, Miss.; launched on 29 October 1977; and commissioned on 10 March 1979. John Hancock was assigned to the Atlantic Fleet and homeported at Charleston, South Carolina from 1979 until 1987. From 1987 onward, John Hancock was homeported at Naval Station Mayport, Florida

Following commissioning, John Hancock proceeded to Naval Station Guantanamo Bay, Cuba for a 'shakedown' cruise and began making routine deployments.

In March 1983, John Hancock reported to Ingalls Shipbuilding in Pascagoula, Mississippi for a six-month overhaul. Upon completion of the overhaul, John Hancock then spent three months in Cuba where the crew successfully completed GITMO re-certification at Naval Station Guantanamo Bay, Cuba before being deployed to provide support in the Persian Gulf in October 1984 to April 1985. Hurricane Diana caused John Hancock and numerous other ships at Charleston, South Carolina to emergency sortie out of the path of the hurricane in September 1984. During a 'show the flag' patrol in the Persian Gulf during the Tanker War between Iraq and Iran, John Hancock was fired upon by an Iraqi Mirage fighter aircraft using an Exocet missile which narrowly missed the destroyer. The missile heavily damaged a salvage tug that was directly in the line of fire.

In 1986, John Hancock deployed to the NATO squadron in June and returned to home port in Charleston, SC in December of that same year. This was designated STANAVFORLANT 2-86. During this time the ship visited: West Germany, the Netherlands, Great Brittain (including Scotland), Denmark, and Norway. John Hancock sailed with ships from: Great Brittain, West Germany, Canada, Norway, Portugal, and the Netherlands. The NATO squadron executed a Freedom of Navigation exercise in the Baltic Sea near Bornholm Island. In November 1986, the ship crossed north of the Arctic Circle on a visit to the port of Narvik, Norway, thus earning its "Blue Nose" designation.

In April 1988 John Hancock provided support in the Persian Gulf for Operation Earnest Will during a six-month deployment and was near the point where USS Stark was hit with two Exocet missiles launched by an Iraqi Air Force aircraft in 1987.

In 1991, John Hancock deployed with the USS America Carrier Battle Group to the North Atlantic for two months in support of Operation North Star '91.

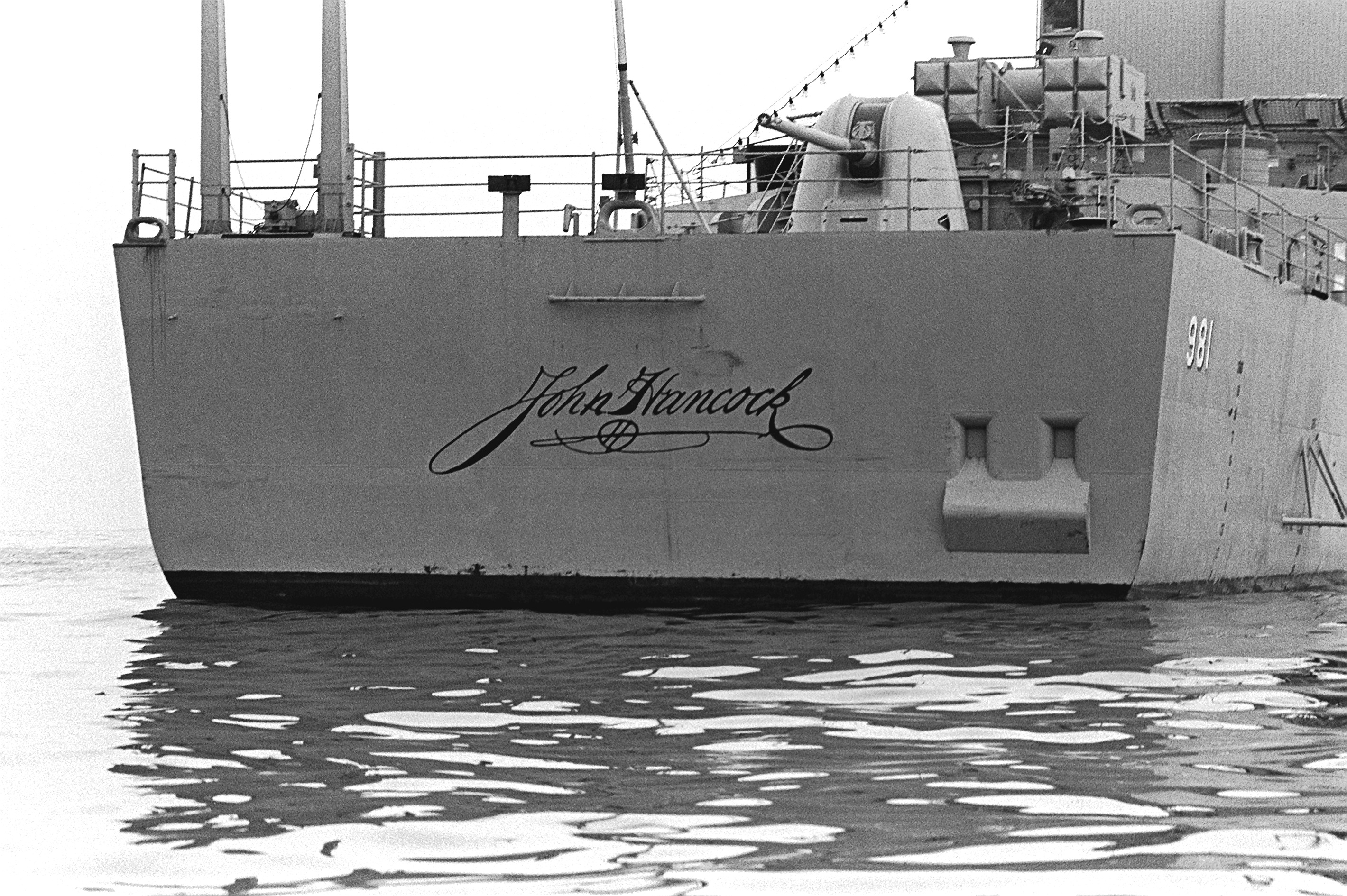
Unique naming on stern of John Hancock

In March 1994, while deployed in the Red Sea, John Hancock, rendered assistance to a wounded Filipino sailor on board a merchant vessel. Shortly thereafter, John Hancock reached a milestone, while conducting multinational maritime interdiction operations (MIO) to enforce United Nations sanctions against Iraq. On 1 April 1994, a team of U.S. Navy ships -- John Hancock, Carr, Underwood and Taylor along with an embarked United States Coast Guard boarding team—intercepted the 20,000th ship since sanctions were put into place in August 1990.

As part of a reorganization announced in July 1995 of the U.S. Atlantic Fleet's surface combatant ships into six core battle groups, nine destroyer squadrons, and a new Western Hemisphere Group, John Hancock was reassigned to Destroyer Squadron 24 (DESRON 24). The reorganization was to be phased in over the summer and take effect 31 August 1995, with homeport shifts occurring through 1998.

As a precautionary measure against oncoming Hurricane Fran, John Hancock was one of 13 Navy ships sent to sea in September 1996. The hurricane was heading, at the time, for the southeast coast of Florida with winds gusting up to 120 mph.

In 1996, John Hancock, along with USS Wasp, USS Carl Vinson, USS Anchorage, and USS George Washington, were selected to serve as test platforms for the P2 afloat program, after studies at Navy installations indicated that a large quantity of a naval base's toxic material and hazardous waste originated from ships floating material they had accumulated and stored during deployment. The P2 Afloat Program aims to reduce hazardous material procurement costs for ships, improve safety and health aboard ship, improve quality of life, and reduce operation and support costs.

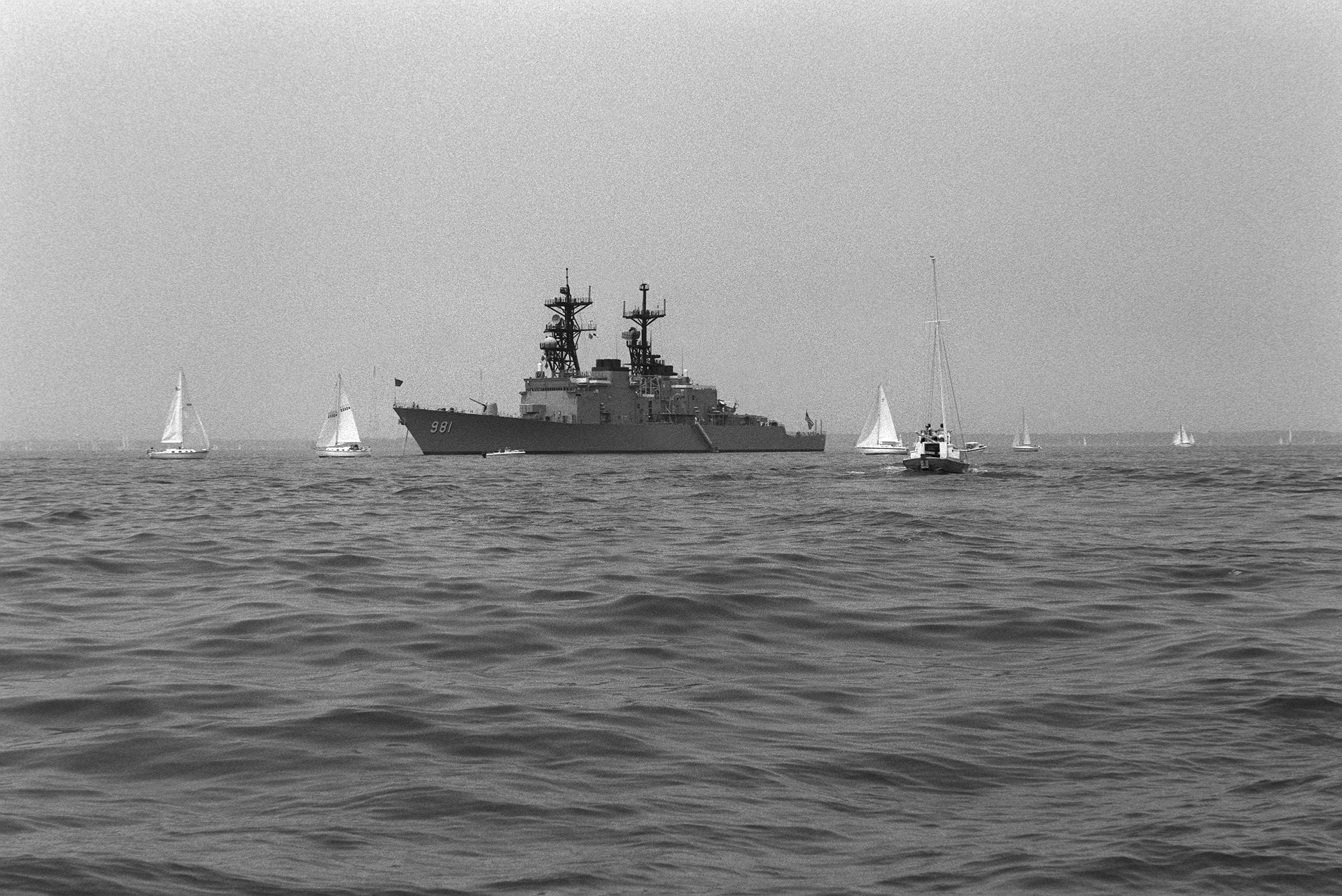
John Hancock anchored in the Chesapeake Bay

On 29 April 1997, John Hancock departed for a six-month overseas deployment as part of the USS John F. Kennedy carrier battle group (CVBG). Also departing was the USS Kearsarge Amphibious Ready Group (ARG). The CVBG was to relieve the USS Theodore Roosevelt CVBG, which had been operating in the Mediterranean Sea, Adriatic Sea, Red Sea and Persian Gulf since the previous November. The John F. Kennedy CVBG and Kearsarge ARG completed a Joint Task Force Exercise (JTFEX) the month prior, the culmination of about six months of pre-deployment training and work-ups. The joint service exercise included surveillance, rescue, humanitarian assistance, maritime interdiction, embassy support and non-combatant evacuation operations, all of which had been recently performed by Navy and United States Marine Corps units deployed overseas.

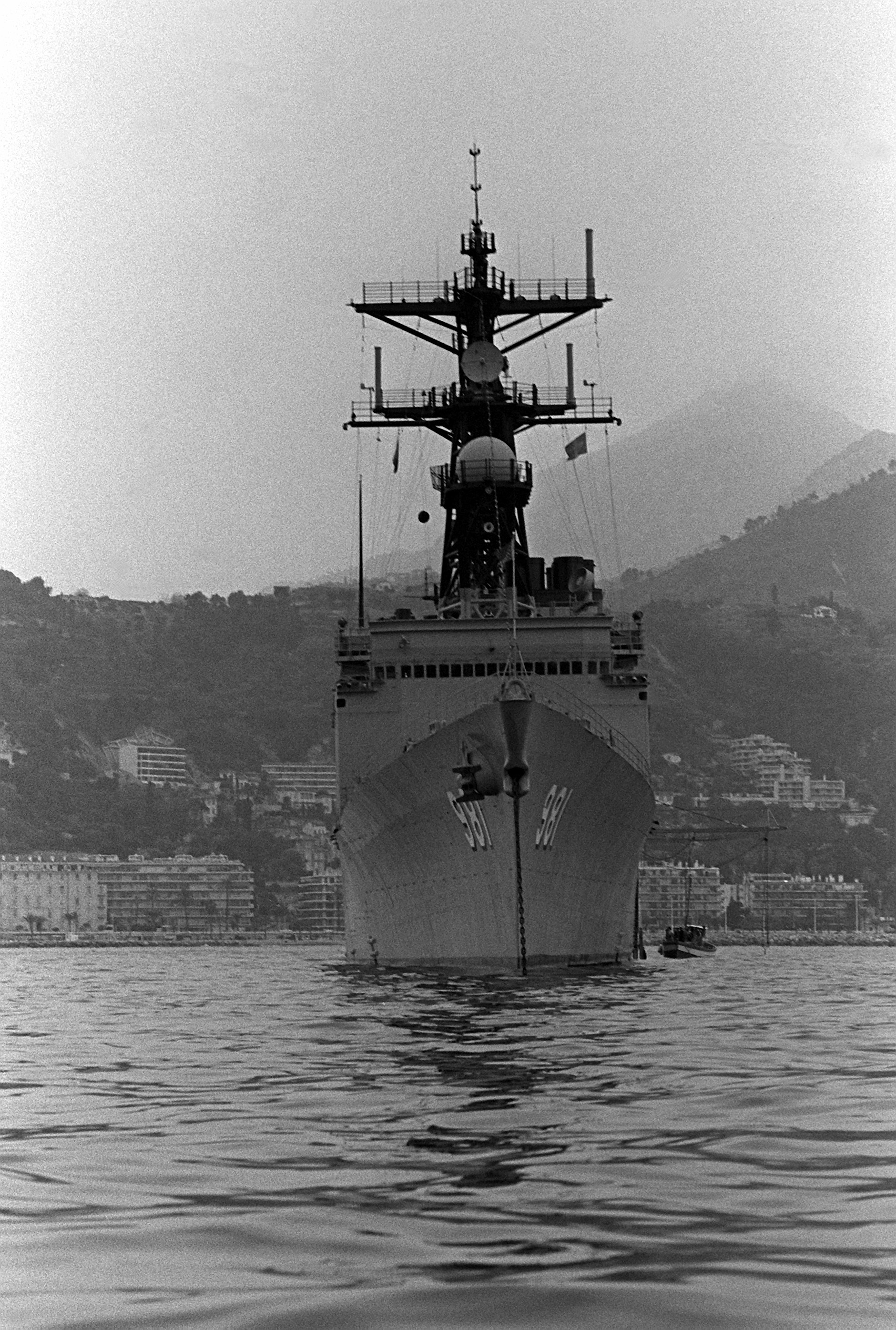
Bow view c. 1981

In August 1997, John Hancock deployed to the coast of Tunisia to participate in Exercise NADOR 97–3. John Hancock was also there in March for NADOR 97–2. For NADOR 97–3, the crew of John Hancock operated with two Tunisian combatant patrol boats and increased the level of difficulty. They conducted air and high speed surface gunnery exercises, air tracking and engagement simulations, and free-play "encounter" exercises. John Hancock also performed a maritime interdiction demonstration on board the two patrol boats. Simulating merchant vessels, the patrol boats were queried using the bridge-to-bridge radio. After evaluating the suspect merchants' answers, John Hancock's boarding team was sent to each vessel using a rigid-hulled inflatable boat (RHIB). The boarding team inspected each merchant's manifest and cargo, and directed the suspect vessel to continue on its journey or divert to the nearest port for a full inspection of cargo.

With the John F. Kennedy CVBG, John Hancock in July participated in the U.S. 6th Fleet Exercise Invitex, involving 12 nations. During Invitex, allied forces, including 13,000 U.S. sailors and marines, were challenged to effectively manage the way they communicate and act upon operational information as it is processed and distributed to allied decision-makers. It also took part in NATO'S Exercise Dynamic Mix, from 23 September though 7 October which placed the John F. Kennedy Battle Group units on opposing sides. That exercise was designed to increase task force and unit readiness as forces implemented NATO strategy and doctrine.

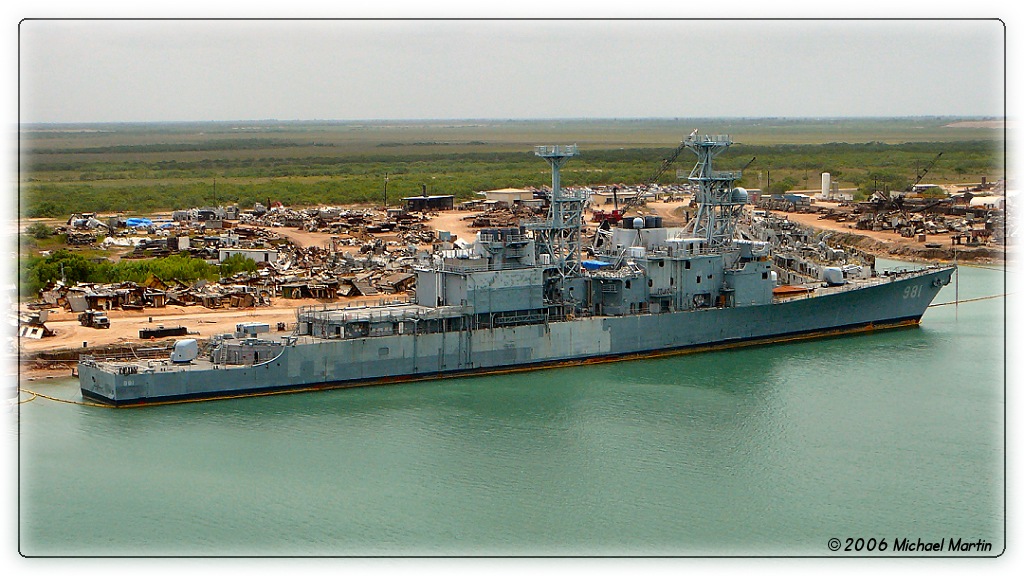
USS John Hancock sits in the Port of Brownsville Ship Channel awaiting recycling

John Hancock returned home on 28 October after six months of operating in the Mediterranean Sea and the Adriatic Sea in support of Operation Deliberate Guard and the Persian Gulf supporting Operation Southern Watch.

John Hancock took part in the sixth International Naval Review (INR) in New York City from 3 to 9 July 2000.

=== Fate ===
On 16 October 2000, John Hancock was decommissioned and steamed to Philadelphia, Pennsylvania where she was placed in reserve at the Naval Intermediate Ship Maintenance Facility in Philadelphia, Pennsylvania. She was sold to International Shipbreaking Limited of Brownsville, Texas in 2006. She was then towed to the Port of Brownsville and scrapped on 29 April 2007.

== Ship's crest ==
The official crest of John Hancock symbolizes the service John Hancock gave his country, both as President of the Continental Congress and as Chairman of the Marine Committee. The dominant colors of the crest are blue and gold, which are traditionally used by the U.S. Navy.

The shield represents the Marine Committee for which John Hancock served as the first chairman. This committee fulfilled responsibilities for naval affairs similar to those now assigned to the United States Department of the Navy. John Hancock, as chairman, supervised the construction and fitting out of the thirteen frigates of the initial shipbuilding program. The second ship named John Hancock was built and commissioned into the Navy at this time.

The white and blue wavy bars at the center of the shield form a heraldic symbol for water, and the anchor symbolizes naval affairs. The sunburst, a symbol of birth, has thirteen rays with thirteen stars representing the thirteen frigates.

John Hancock, who was the first to sign the Declaration of Independence, also presided over the Massachusetts Convention, which ratified the federal constitution. These events are represented by the scroll, Liberty Bell, and quills. The quills are crossed as a symbol of strength and resolution, while their green color refers to growth and life.

== Gallery ==
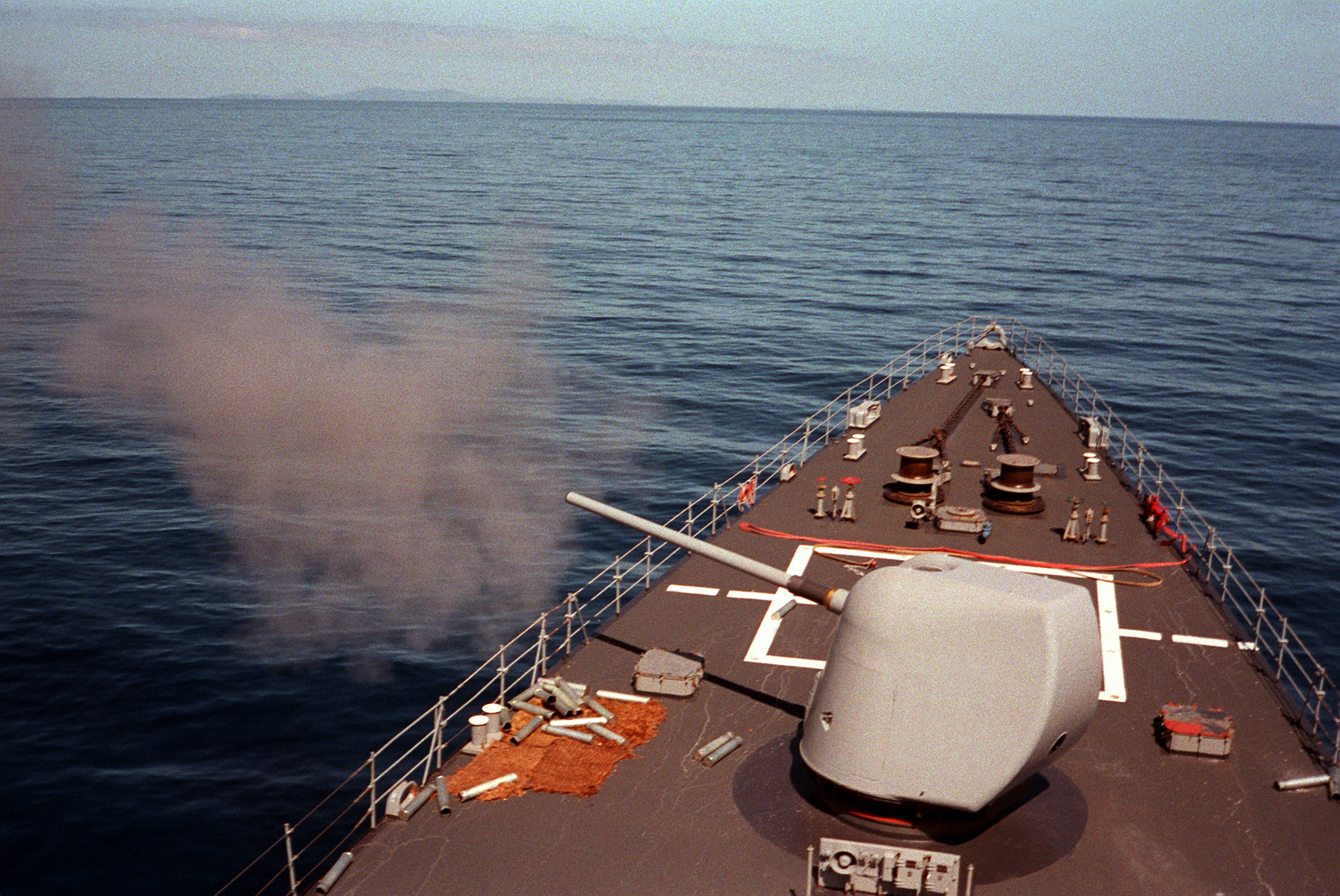
USS John Hancock's 5-inch gun on 1 February 1986

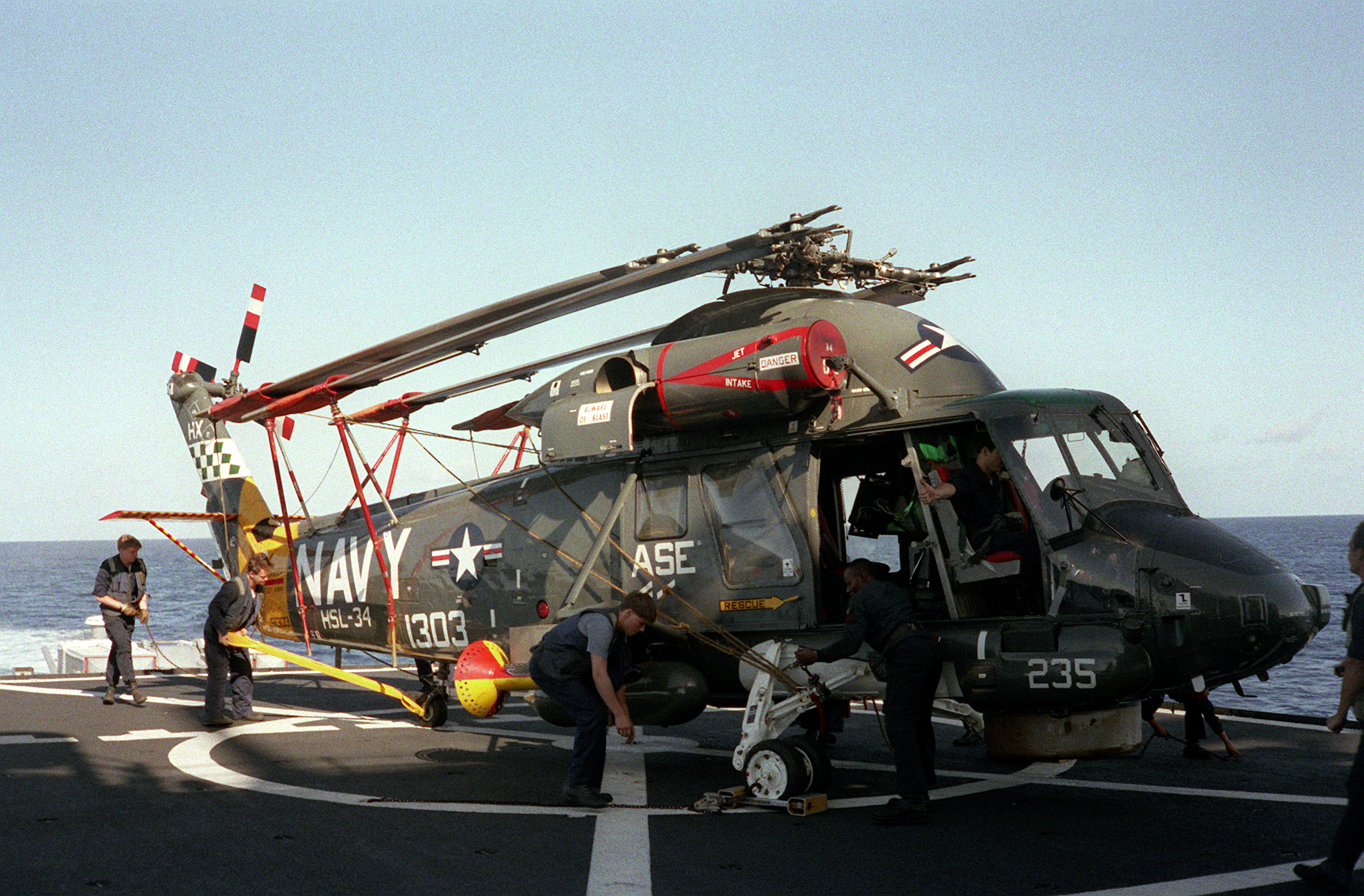
USS John Hancock's SH-2F Seasprite in 1986

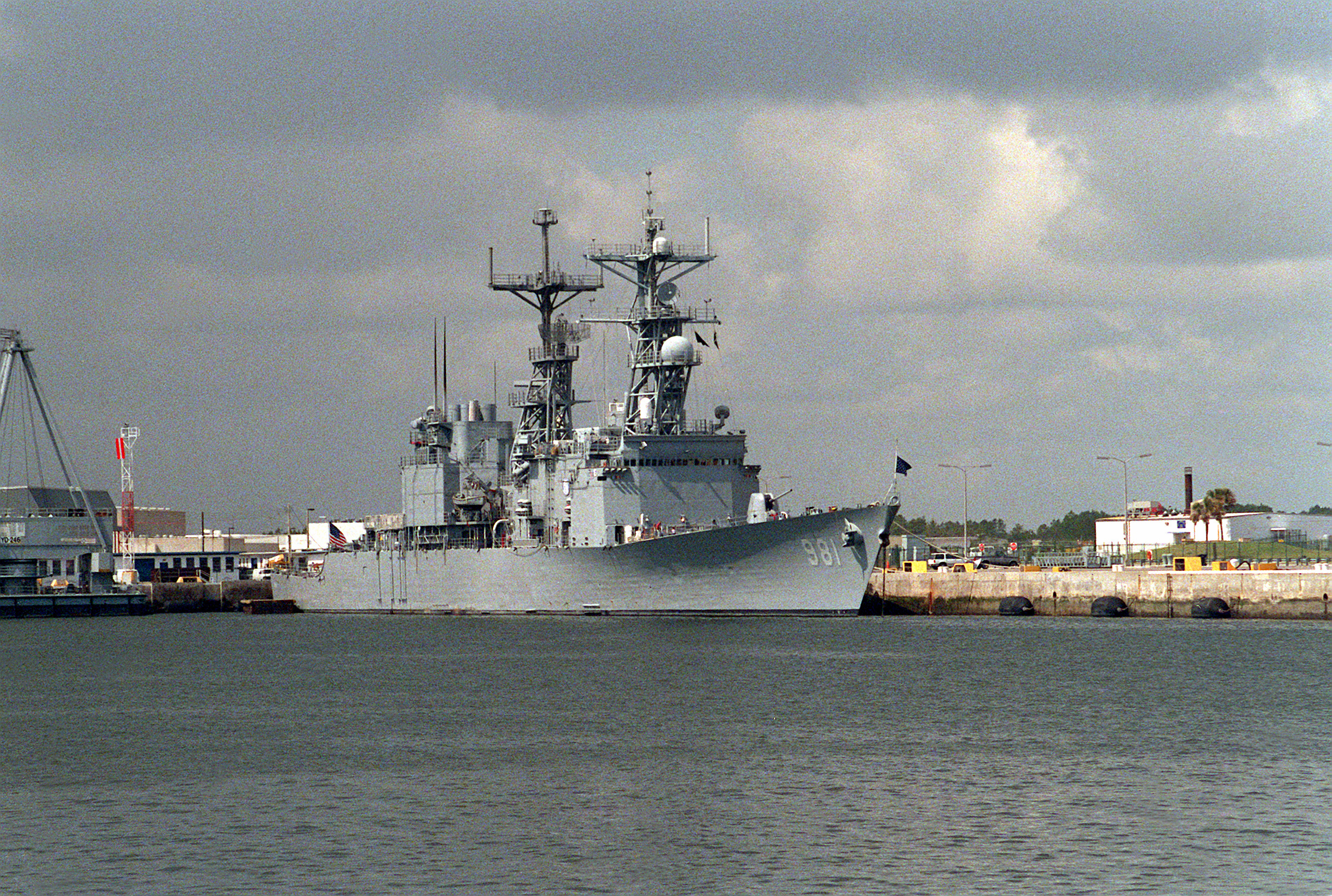
USS John Hancock in Mayport on 22 May 1993

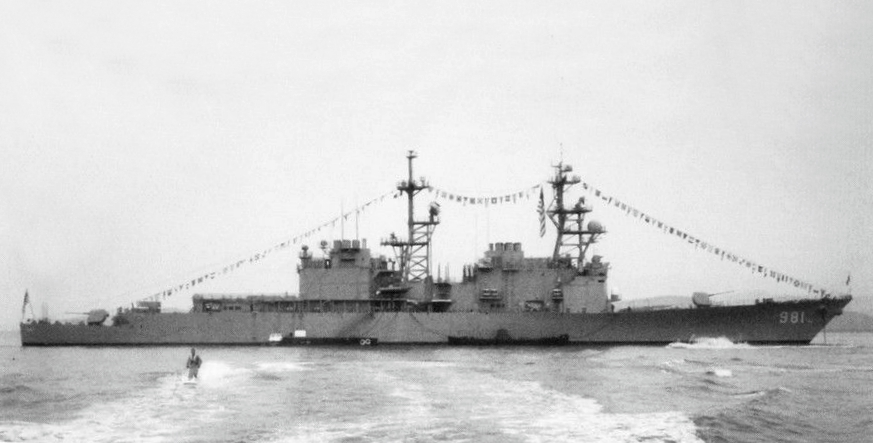
USS John Hancock in 1997
