= USS Hancock =

Several ships of the United States Navy have been named USS Hancock or USS John Hancock, in honor of patriot, Founding Father, and statesman John Hancock.

- USS Hancock (1775) was the former schooner Speedwell, one of a small flotilla hired in October 1775. She was declared unfit for service late in 1776, and returned to her owner early the following year.
- USS Hancock (1776) was a sailing frigate commissioned in 1776 and captured by the British in 1777. Renamed HMS Iris, in 1781 she was captured by a French squadron. The French Navy sold her in 1784.
- USS Hancock (1778), was a frigate launched 28 April 1778, and renamed USS Alliance (1778) by the Continental Congress to honor the entry of France into the war.
- USS Hancock (AP-3), originally SS Arizona, was purchased by the United States Department of War, then transferred to the Navy in 1902, and used as a transport until 1925.
- USS Hancock (CV-19), was an aircraft carrier originally named Ticonderoga, and renamed while under construction in 1943. Hancock was launched in 1944 and sold for scrap in 1976.

== See also ==
- USS John Hancock
- USS Lewis Hancock
