= Mount Hancock =

Mount Hancock may refer to:

- Hancock Mountain (Oklahoma)
- Hancock Mountain (Oregon)
- Hancock Mountain (Vermont)
- Hancock Peak (Colorado)
- Hancock Peak (New Hampshire)
- Hancock Peak (Alaska)
- Hancock Peak (Iron County, Utah)
- Hancock Peak (Garfield County, Utah)
- Mount Hancock (Montana)
- Mount Hancock (New Hampshire)
- Mount Hancock (Wyoming)

== See also ==
- Hancock Hill (disambiguation), listing hills, knolls and buttes
