= Hancock County =

Hancock County is the name of ten counties in the United States. All are named for John Hancock who was a leader in the American Revolution. The counties are:

- Hancock County, Georgia
- Hancock County, Illinois
- Hancock County, Indiana
- Hancock County, Iowa
- Hancock County, Kentucky
- Hancock County, Maine
- Hancock County, Mississippi
- Hancock County, Ohio
- Hancock County, Tennessee
- Hancock County, West Virginia

== Formerly ==
- Winston County, Alabama, named Hancock County until 1858
