= Hancock Township =

Hancock Township may refer to:

- Hancock Township, Hancock County, Illinois
- Hancock Township, Plymouth County, Iowa
- Hancock Township, Osborne County, Kansas, in Osborne County, Kansas
- Hancock Township, Michigan
- Hancock Township, Carver County, Minnesota
