= Elisha Cooke Jr. =

American politician

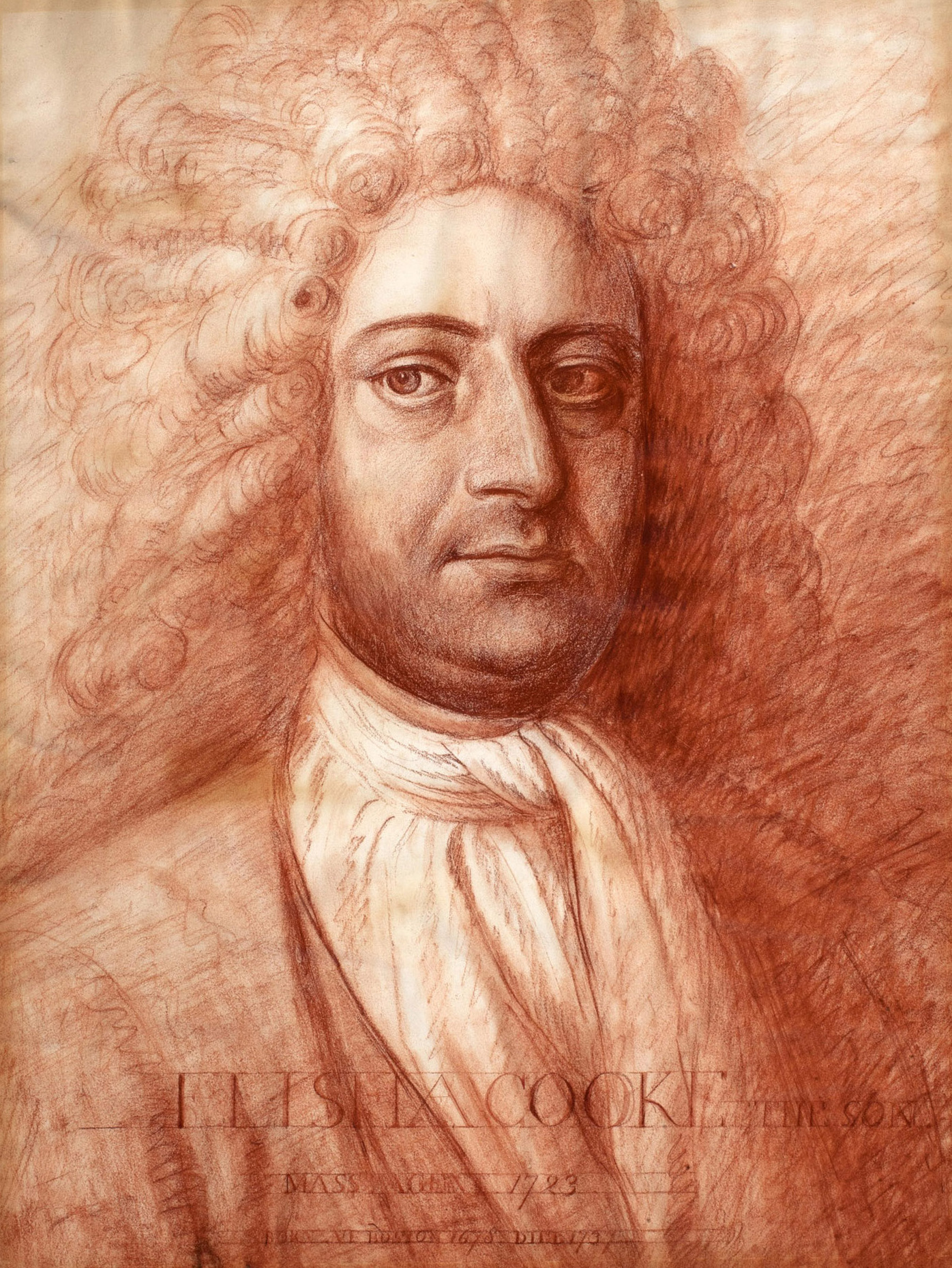
c. 1805 portrait of Cooke

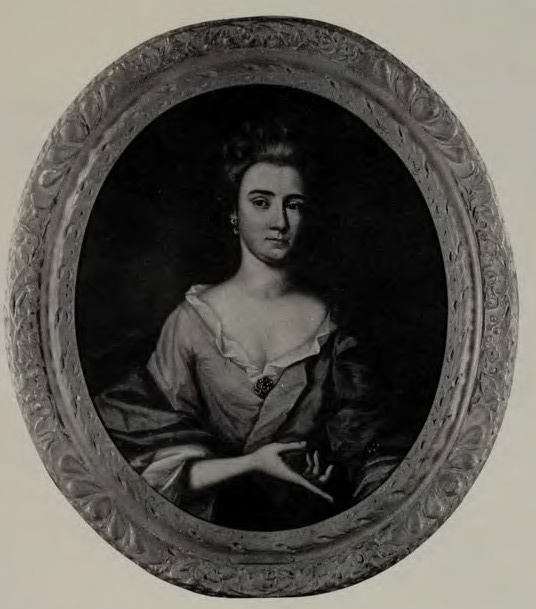
Jane Middleton Cooke

Elisha Cooke Jr. (December 20, 1678 – August 24, 1737) was a physician and politician from the Province of Massachusetts Bay. He was the son of Elisha Cooke Sr. (1637–1715), a wealthy Massachusetts physician and politician who was elected Speaker of the Massachusetts House of Representatives in 1683. He graduated from Harvard University in 1697.

Like his father, the junior Cooke was the leader of the "popular party", a faction in the Massachusetts House that resisted encroachment by royal officials on colonial rights embodied in the Massachusetts Charter. As such, he was involved in contentious disputes with several colonial governors. When the House selected Cooke as its Speaker in 1720, Governor Samuel Shute dissolved the House and called for new elections. Cooke and the House insisted on the right to choose their own Speaker, to no avail.

Cooke was one of the richest men in the province, with an estate valued at his death in 1737 at £63,000. He was a heavy drinker, and the owner of the Goat Tavern on King Street. There is strong evidence to suggest that the Boston Caucus was established around 1719 by Elisha Cooke Jr. According to Peter Oliver, the last chief justice of Massachusetts before the revolution, the caucus spent huge amounts of money on liquor to win elections in the 1720s. Cooke seems to also have had much influence in the marked relaxation in liquor licensing in the 1720s, which was popular with large numbers of voters. According to the historian G.B. Warden, Elisha Cooke Jr. "contributed more than anyone else to the public life of colonial Boston."

Cooke worked closely with Samuel Adams Sr. (1689–1748), whose son Samuel Adams would continue the struggle to defend colonial rights, ultimately leading to the American Revolution.

== Sources ==
- Brown, Richard Maxwell (1975-01-02). Strain of Violence: Historical Studies of American Violence and Vigilantism. Oxford University Press. ISBN 978-0-19-501943-8.
- Conroy, David W. (1995-06-19). In Public Houses: Drink & the Revolution of Authority in Colonial Massachusetts. UNC Press Books. pp. 169–. ISBN 978-0-8078-4521-9.
- Lustig, Mary Lou (February 2000). "Cooke, Elisha Jr". American National Biography Online.
