= Boston Caucus =

Informal political organization

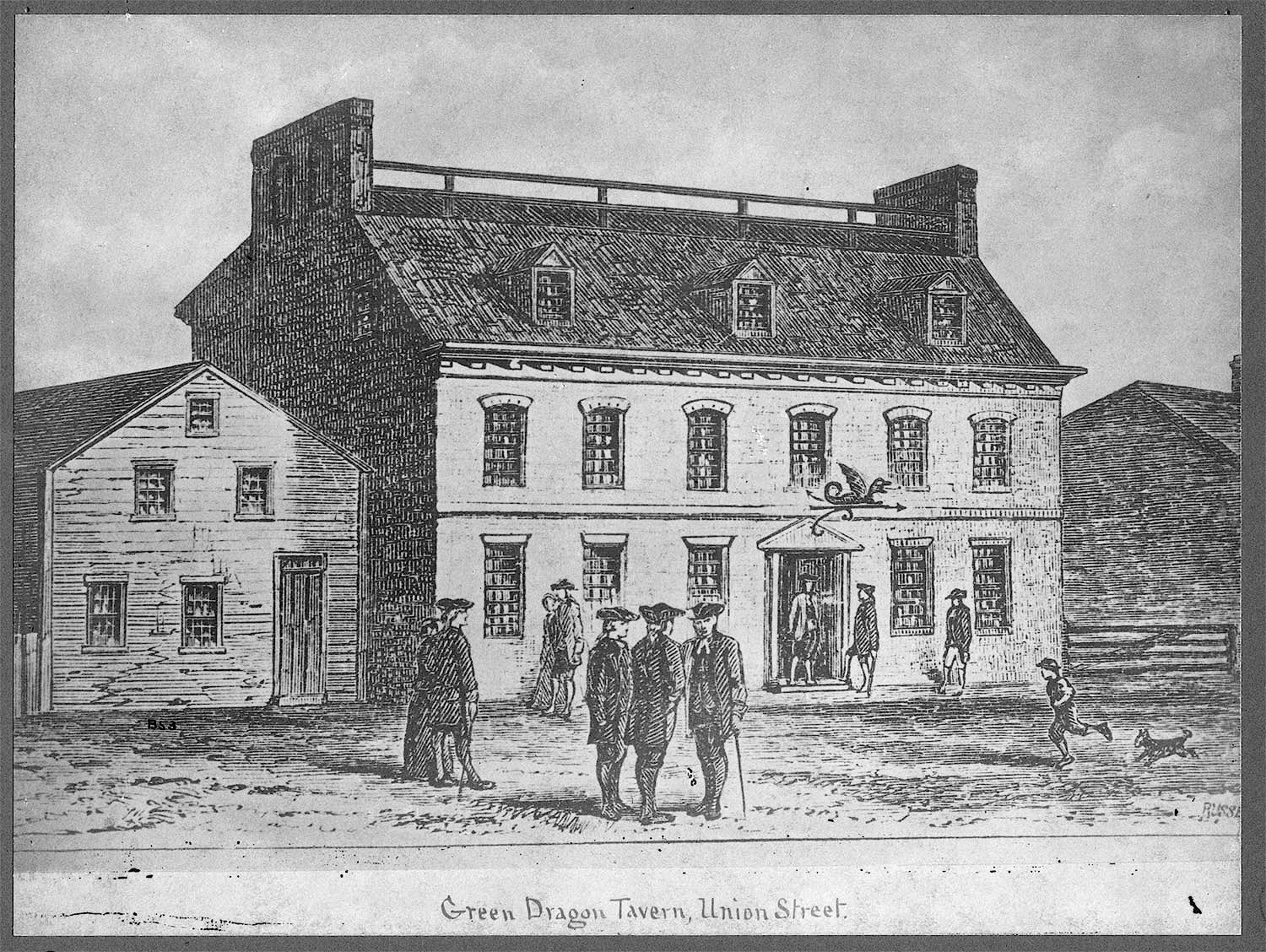
- The Green Dragon Tavern, a rendezvous point for the Boston Caucus in the 1770s
- Predecessor: Lewis Hotchin
- Formation: 1719
- Dissolved: 1776
- Type: Political club
- Headquarters: Boston
- Official language: English

The Boston Caucus was an informal political organization that had considerable influence in Boston in the years before and after the American Revolution. This was perhaps the first use of the word caucus to mean a meeting of members of a movement or political party to agree on a common position. (Note: Various theories have been advanced on the origins of the word caucus, although all agree that it originated in pre-revolutionary Boston. Most early sources say the name is derived from a meeting of "caulkers", or ship workers. Another explanation, proposed by James Hammond Trumbull in 1872 and supported by other authorities, is that it comes from the Algonquin language Kaw-kaw-was, cau-cau-as-u, or caw-cawwassoughes meaning "counselor".)

The Boston Caucus was established in around 1719 by the popular physician and merchant Elisha Cooke, Jr. It quickly grew as a powerful political force in the area but its later activities are what associate it most with Samuel Adams and the run up to American Independence. Adams became an influential leader of the caucus in the 1750s and used the club in the 1760s and 1770s to help gain him political leeway. The group developed a nefarious, rebellious reputation, meeting in taverns, and plotting. The Boston Caucus and Samuel Adams were reputed to have had significant influence in 1773 with the events associated with the Boston Tea Party.

== Early years ==
No written records survive of the early years of the caucus before 1740, but there is strong evidence to suggest that it was established around 1719 by the popular physician and merchant Elisha Cooke, Jr. Cooke was one of the richest men in the province, with an estate valued at his death in 1737 at £63,000. He was a heavy drinker, and the owner of the Goat Tavern on King Street. Another early member of the Caucus was Deacon Adams, father of Samuel Adams, a wealthy businessman who became an eminent figure in New England politics. The goals of the caucus were to protect the interests of the lower and middle classes in Boston, and to champion popular programs. Members of the Caucus included the leadership of the "popular party", also known as the "whigs" or "patriots", and the caucus had growing influence in Boston as it defined issues, promoted political views and challenged the authority of the crown.

Although providing representation for the common people, the Caucus in some ways subverted the democratic process by setting the agenda for the Boston Town Meetings in advance, and through concerted action largely predetermining the results. According to Peter Oliver, the last chief justice of Massachusetts before the revolution, the caucus spent huge amounts of money on liquor to win elections in the 1720s. Cooke seems to also have had much influence in the marked relaxation in liquor licensing in the 1720s, which was popular with large numbers of voters. The historian G.B. Warden said that Elisha Cooke Jr. "contributed more than anyone else to the public life of colonial Boston."

== Meeting structure ==
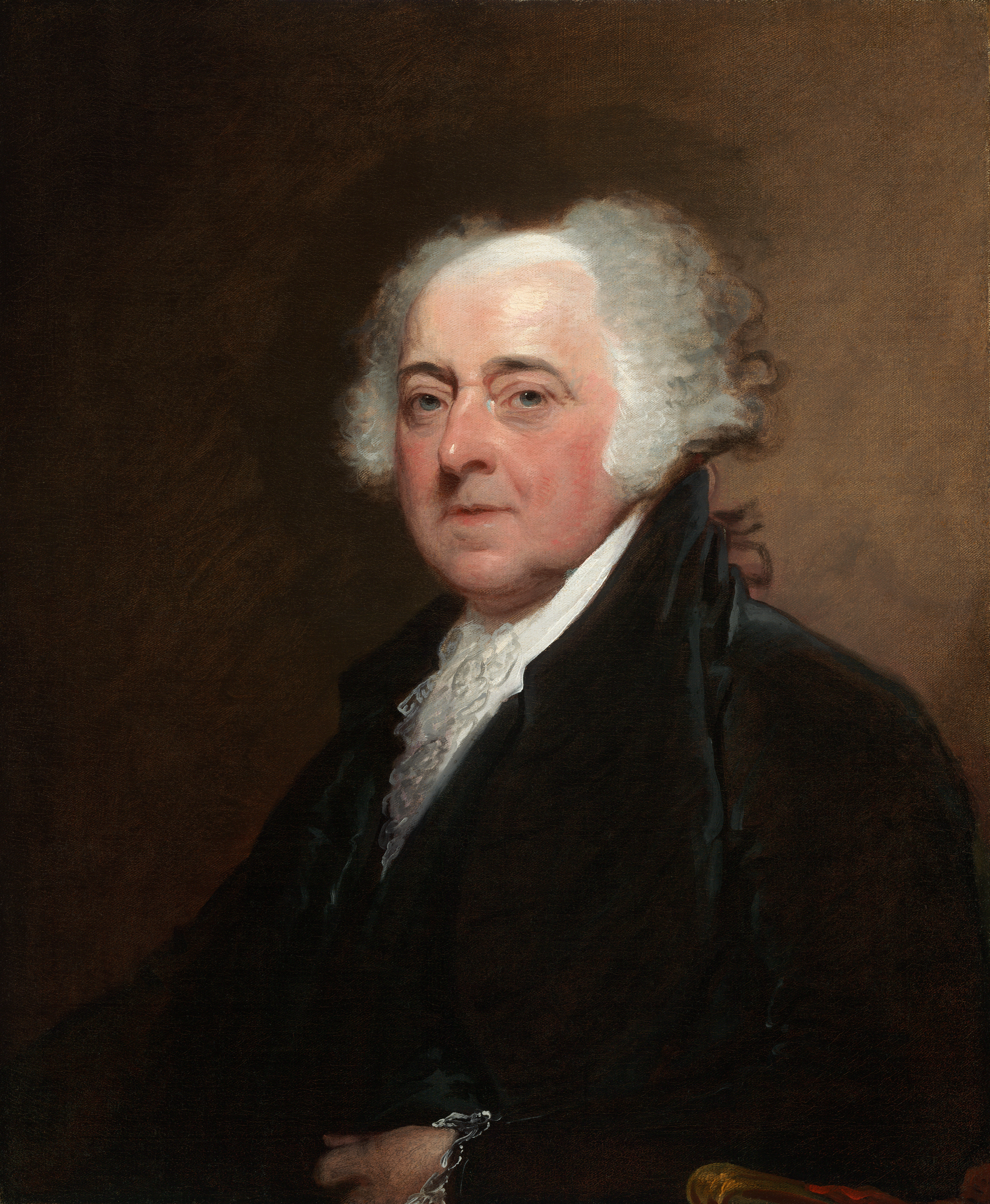
John Adams, second cousin of Samuel Adams and later President of the U.S., described the caucus meetings in 1763

The Rev. William Gordon, in his History of the Independence of the United States of America (London, 1788), said:

More than fifty years ago Mr. Samuel Adams' father and twenty others, one or two from the north end of the town where all the ship business is carried on, used to meet, make a caucus and lay their plan for introducing certain persons into places of trust and power. When they had settled it they separated, and each used their particular influence within his own circle. He and his friends would furnish themselves with ballots, including the names of the parties fixed upon, which they distributed on the days of election. By acting in concert, together with a careful and extensive distribution of ballots, they generally carried their elections to their own mind. In like manner it was that Mr. Samuel Adams first became a representative for Boston.

John Adams, at the time a country lawyer from Braintree, described the way in which the caucus worked in 1763. He said that at the meetings, "...selectmen, assessors, collectors, fire-wards and representatives are regularly chosen before they are chosen in the town ... there they smoke tobacco till you cannot see from one end of the garret to the other". Adams said that after coming to a decision, "They send committees to wait on the merchants' club." This implies that the leading businessmen of the city still ultimately made the decisions, while listening to the views of the Caucus and taking into consideration the popular support that the Caucus could muster.

The technique of making decisions like this in smoke-filled rooms before the public democratic process started was to have a long history in U.S. politics. The Caucus set the model for modern political machine politics in which the inner circle would select the candidates and ensure election through buying drinks for the working class voters.

== Samuel Adams era ==
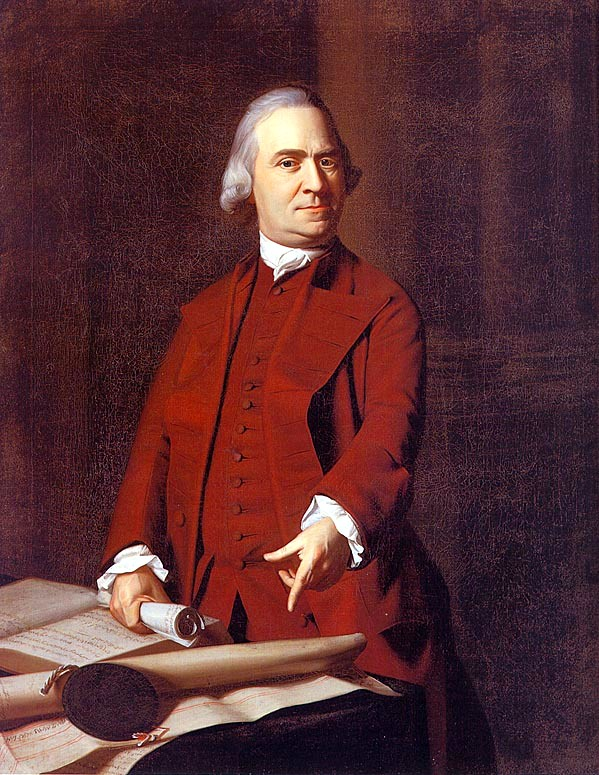
Samuel Adams, a leading member of the caucus from the 1750s

Samuel Adams, whose father had been one of the founders of the caucus, became an influential leader of the caucus in the 1750s. Adams also became part of the Sons of Liberty, a mass movement of mostly working class men that could be used in street protests to support the goals of the Boston leaders opposed to British rule. (Note: Samuel Adams's name, although not alphabetically the first, heads the list of 355 names in "An Alphabetical List of the Sons of Liberty who din'd at Liberty Tree Dorchester, August 14, 1769.") The caucus remained true to its principles of supporting the rights of the common man to political and economic freedom. However, in 1763 members of the court party gave a less flattering view of what they called "the Junto", saying that the members of the caucus were involved only to gain personal advantage, and that they opposed the government for this reason. Some said that Samuel Adams used the Caucus to make himself "Dictator" of Boston. This slur originated with loyalists who hated Adams and could not believe that common people - "the mob" - could act in their own interests without guidance from Adams.

From 1751 the caucus collaborated with a "Merchant's Club", a "select group of shipowners and wholesalers", to "protest the oppressive tactics of royal customs officials". Three more Caucus Clubs were formed in the 1760s, for the South End, North End and Middle, in addition to the original club. Sam Adams was a member of all of them. These clubs complemented the Loyal Nine and Sons of Liberty patriot organizations, but various other clubs also had political goals, notably the Freemasons' lodge of St. Andrews. The North End caucus seems to have been launched in 1767, although the first records are from 1772. This caucus first met in the Salutation Tavern and later in the Green Dragon Tavern. Paul Revere was a member. It is at the Green Dragon Tavern that Adams and the Caucus were said to have conspired to hatch the Boston Tea Party plot of 1773.

== Critical commentary on the press ==
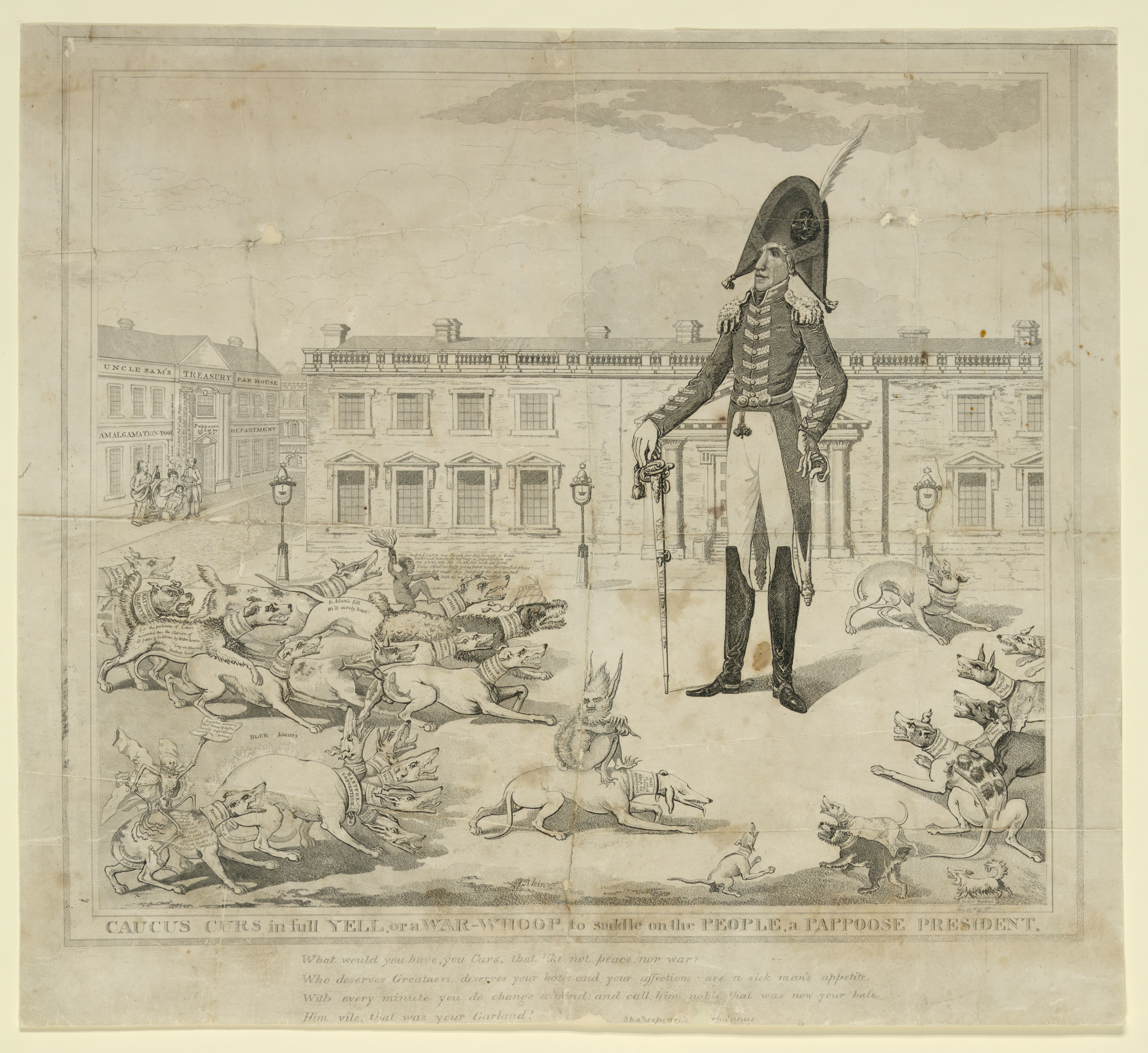
Cartoon by James Akin. Caucus curs in full yell, or a war whoop, to saddle on the people, a pappoose president / J[ames] Akin, Aquafortis

A critical commentary on the press's treatment of Andrew Jackson, and on the practice of nominating candidates by caucus during the presidential race of 1824 with James Akin's cartoon pointedly attacks Republican nominee William Crawford and his powerful supporter Martin Van Buren. Jackson, in military uniform, stands amid a pack of snarling dogs labeled with the names of various critical newspapers. He rests his right hand upon a sword inscribed "Veni Vidi Vici." One dog, named "Richmond Whig," is whipped by a nude black boy who says, "Mas Andra I earry say dis eah jew dog blongst to Tunis, bark loud, somebody tief way ee paper & show um one ghose, wite like Clay; dat mak um feard. Name o' God! nobody gwine feard now for Crawfud ghose! look pon dat sleepy dog; jumbee da ride um, can't bark no mo for Crawfud." In the lower left corner a dog named "Democratic Press" is ridden by a skeletal Death figure holding aloft a tract with the words "Immortal memory Revd. James Quigley basely sacrificed conscience Avaunt!" On the dog's side appear the words, "Good sprite, In mercy lash me with a dry corn stalk; I'm so jaded by stable swooning smoke house steams & Hog Cellar sweats!" A five-headed dog named "Hartford Convention" also appears at lower left. In the left background, before a building marked "Uncle Sam's Treasury Pap House / Amalgamation-Tool Department," Treasury Secretary William Crawford offers a bowl of dollars to a befeathered woman, saying "Here's a bowl full of solid pappose [sic] meat. that's a good Girl better marry our wild, Indians than Foreigners good or bad." She says, "O! stuff your mouth you brat! Treasury pap is better than rum." An Indian beside her says, "Rum for de baby." Below the image is a text from Shakespeare's Coriolanus: "What would you have, you Curs, that like not peace, nor war? / Who deserves Greatness, deserves your hate; and your affections are a sick man's appetite. / With every minute you do change a mind: and call him noble that was now your hate. / Him vile that was your Garland!"

== Notable members ==
- Benjamin Kent, Attorney General of Massachusetts, Boston
