= John Richards (Salem witch trials) =

Colonial military officer, businessman, politician, and magistrate

John Richards (1644? – April 2, 1694) was a colonial military officer, businessman, politician, and magistrate, best known for his participation in the Salem witch trials in 1692.

== Life ==
Coat of Arms of John Richards

The early life of John Richards is obscure due to a lack of written records. According to some sources, he was born in England and traveled with his parents in 1630 to North America as part of the first major wave of migration to the Massachusetts Bay Colony.

In 1644 Ricards was enrolled in the Ancient and Honorable Artillery Company, which he would remain involved with for the rest of his life. A resident of Dorchester for most of his life, he operated a mill, and frequently served as on the colony's general court (as its assembly was known).

The colony did not have a residency requirement, and he usually represented communities (such as Hadley that were distant from Boston, where the assembly met. In 1679 and 1680, however, he was chosen to represent Boston, and was elected speaker in 1680. From 1680-84 he served as one of the colony's assistants, whose council served as the upper body of the assembly and as the colony's highest court.

In 1681 Richards was appointed along with Joseph Dudley to represent the colony in London in an attempt to address royal concerns over the colony's administration. King Charles II had, upon his restoration, insisted that the colony exhibit more religious tolerance and adhere more closely to the Navigation Acts, both of which the colony's hardline administration had resisted doing. Richards and Dudley were unsuccessful in their negotiations with the Lords of Trade, because the colonial government had specifically denied them authority to agree to changes in the colonial charter. Richards was of the opinion that the colonial government should acquiesce to the crown demands, and was consequently voted from office in 1684. That year, the colonial charter was revoked.

In 1686 the Dominion of New England was established, with Joseph Dudley as its first governor, and Sir Edmund Andros as its second. He served as a judge under Dudley's brief administration, but was apparently opposed to Andros' unpopular rule, in which he played no part. The dominion was overturned in 1689 when Andros and Dudley were arrested in the wake of the Glorious Revolution. The old colonial administration was restored, and Richards was once again made an assistant.

== Witch trials ==
In 1692 Sir William Phips arrived in the colony bearing the new charter for the Province of Massachusetts Bay, and a commission as governor. Phips' arrival occurred during the height of a witchcraft scare in the Salem area of Essex County. Phips created a Special Court of Oyer and Terminer, to which Richards was appointed. This court oversaw the conviction and execution of nineteen individuals in the infamous Salem witch trials.

When the Superior Court of Judicature was formed as the province's high court, Richards was also appointed to it. This court disposed of a great many more witchcraft cases, acquitting many; its witchcraft-related convictions in 1693 were vacated by Governor Phips.

== Death ==
Chief Justice Samuel Sewall wrote in his diary that Richards died in Boston on April 2, 1694 reportedly from a fit of apoplexy. Sewall mentioned that his death came "suddenly and unexpectedly" at the age of 50. If true, this given age would mean that Richard's was born after 1630.

Legal offices
New seat	Associate Justice of the Massachusetts Superior Court of Judicature; 1692–1694	Succeeded by Elisha Cooke, Sr.
