= Samuel Adams Sr. =

American brewer

Samuel Adams Sr. (1689–1748) was an American brewer, father of American Founding Father Samuel Adams, and first cousin once removed of John Adams.

== Early life ==
Adams was born in Boston, on May 16, 1689, to Captain John Adams (1661–1702) and Hannah Adams (nee Webb). He was a deacon in the Congregational Church.

== Career ==
He was a Boston Caucus member with Elisha Cooke. Advertisements from Boston suggest that Adams Sr. owned and sold at least one "Carolina Indian" slave in 1716.

In 1740, he helped create a Land Bank in Massachusetts Bay Colony, using paper money to promote commerce, with a scarcity of gold and silver coins. In July 1741, the House of Commons passed a bill destroying the land bank, by making shareholders liable for the bank's debts.

== Family ==
In 1713, he married Mary Fifield (1694–1748). They had twelve children. Three survived into adulthood, including Samuel Adams. Adams Sr. died in 1748.

In the marriage of Samuel Adams Sr. and Mary Fifield, twelve children were born, four of whom survived:

- Aaron Adams (1713–1740)
- Richard Adams (1715–1716)
- Mary Adams (1717–1767) – married James Allen (1708–1755)
- Hannah Adams (1720–1721)
- Samuel Adams (1722–1803) – founding father of the United States, governor of Massachusetts from 1793 to 1797.
- John Adams (1724–1726)
- John Adams (1727–1738)
- Joseph Adams (1728-1762)
- Thomas Adams (1731–1732)
- Sarah Adams (1733–1734)
- Abigail Adams (1735–1736)
- Mehitable Adams (1740–1741)
