= Samuel Adams =

Founding Father of the United States (1722–1803)

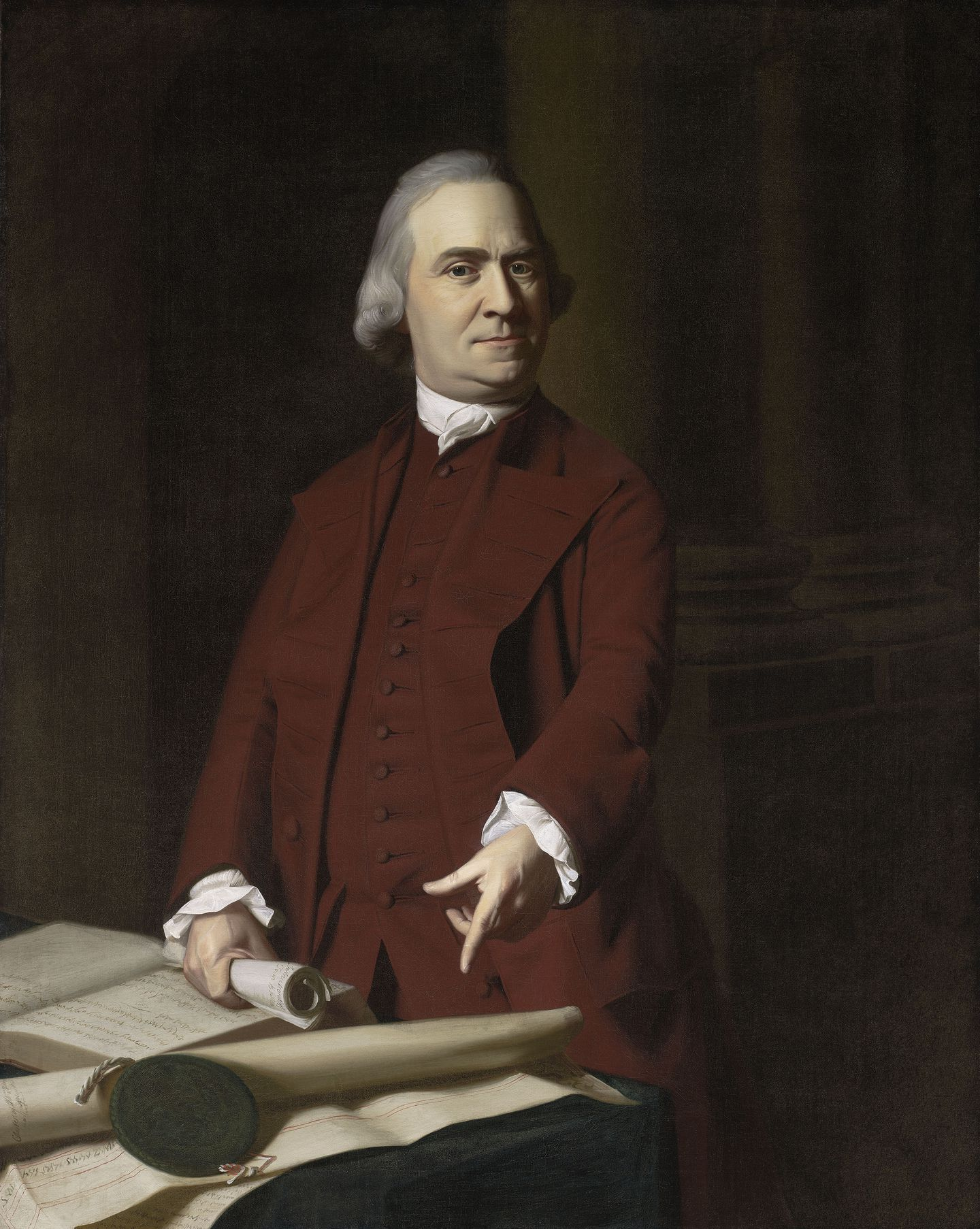
- Portrait by John Singleton Copley, c. 1772. In this portrait, Adams points at the Massachusetts Charter, which he viewed as a constitution that protected the peoples' rights.

4th Governor of Massachusetts
- In office October 8, 1794 – June 2, 1797; Acting: October 8, 1793 – October 8, 1794
- Lieutenant: Moses Gill
- Preceded by: John Hancock
- Succeeded by: Increase Sumner

3rd Lieutenant Governor of Massachusetts
- In office 1789–1794; Acting Governor; October 8, 1793 – 1794
- Governor: John Hancock
- Preceded by: Benjamin Lincoln
- Succeeded by: Moses Gill

President of the Massachusetts Senate
- In office 1787–1788; 1782–1785

Delegate from Massachusetts to the Continental Congress
- In office 1774–1777
- In office 1779–1781

Clerk of the Massachusetts House of Representatives
- In office 1766–1774

Personal details
- Born: September 27, 1722 Boston, Massachusetts Bay, British America
- Died: October 2, 1803 (aged 81) Cambridge, Massachusetts, U.S.
- Resting place: Granary Burying Ground, Boston
- Party: Democratic-Republican (1790s)
- Spouses: Elizabeth Checkley (m. 1749; died 1757) Elizabeth Wells (m. 1764)
- Children: 6
- Education: Harvard College

Samuel Adams (September 27 [O.S. September 16], 1722 – October 2, 1803) was an American statesman, political philosopher, and a Founding Father of the United States. He was a politician in colonial Massachusetts, a leader of the movement that became the American Revolution, a signatory of the Declaration of Independence and other founding documents, and one of the architects of the principles of American republicanism that shaped the political culture of the United States. He was a second cousin to his fellow Founding Father, President John Adams. He founded the Sons of Liberty.

Adams was born in Boston, brought up in a religious and politically active family. A graduate of Harvard College, he was an unsuccessful businessman and tax collector before concentrating on politics. He was an influential official of the Massachusetts House of Representatives and the Boston Town Meeting in the 1760s, and he became a part of a movement opposed to the British Parliament's efforts to tax the British American colonies without their consent. His 1768 Massachusetts Circular Letter calling for colonial non-cooperation prompted the occupation of Boston by British troops, eventually resulting in the Boston Massacre of 1770. Adams and his colleagues devised a committee of correspondence system in 1772 to help coordinate resistance to what he saw as the British government's attempts to violate the British Constitution at the expense of the colonies, which linked like-minded Patriots throughout the Thirteen Colonies. Continued resistance to British policy resulted in the 1773 Boston Tea Party and the coming of the American Revolution. Adams was actively involved with colonial newspapers publishing accounts of colonial sentiment over British colonial rule, which were fundamental in uniting the colonies. Adams, the ringleader at the destruction of the East India Company's tea, was also actively involved in bribing British soldiers to desert and provided them with new clothes and the offer of land to cultivate..

Parliament passed the Coercive Acts in 1774, at which time Adams attended the Continental Congress in Philadelphia which was convened to coordinate a colonial response. He helped guide Congress towards issuing the Continental Association in 1774 and the Declaration of Independence in 1776, and he helped draft the Articles of Confederation and the Massachusetts Constitution. Adams returned to Massachusetts after the American Revolution, where he served in the state senate and was eventually elected governor.

Adams later became a controversial figure in American history. Accounts written in the 19th century praised him as someone who had been steering his fellow colonists towards independence long before the outbreak of the Revolutionary War. This view was challenged by negative assessments of Adams in the first half of the 20th century, in which he was portrayed as a master of propaganda who provoked mob violence to achieve his goals. However, according to biographer Mark Puls, a different account emerges upon examination of Adams's many writings regarding the civil rights of the colonists, while the mob referred to were a highly reflective group of men inspired by Adams who made his case with reasoned arguments in pamphlets and newspapers, without the use of emotional rhetoric.

== Early life ==
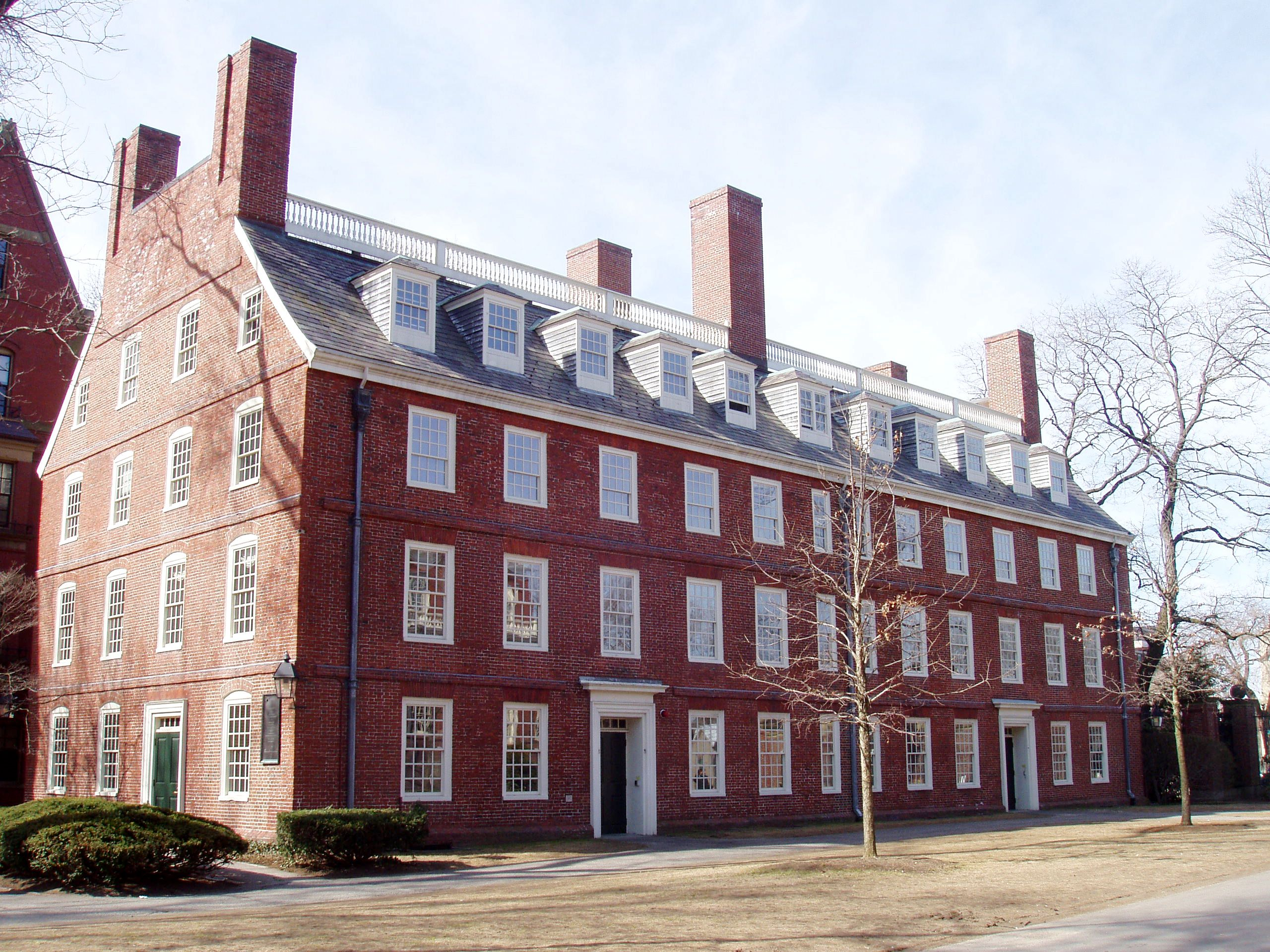
While at Harvard University, Adams boarded at Massachusetts Hall.

Adams was born in Boston in the British colony of Massachusetts on September 16, 1722, an Old Style date that is sometimes converted to the New Style date of September 27. Adams was one of twelve children born to Samuel Adams Sr., and Mary (Fifield) Adams in an age of high infant mortality; only three of these children lived past their third birthday. Adams's parents were devout Puritans and members of the Old South Congregational Church. The family lived on what is today Purchase Street in Boston. Adams was proud of his Puritan heritage, and emphasized Puritan values in his political career, especially virtue.

Samuel Adams Sr. (1689–1748) was a prosperous merchant and church deacon. Deacon Adams became a leading figure in Boston politics through an organization that became known as the Boston Caucus, which promoted candidates who supported popular causes. (Note: The Caucus originally met at Faneuil Hall in Boston, where Adams had made several public speeches advocating independence, and arranged for its relocation to Philadelphia.) Members of the Caucus helped shape the agenda of the Boston Town Meeting. A New England town meeting is a form of local government with elected officials, and not just a gathering of citizens; according to historian William Fowler, it was "the most democratic institution in the British empire". Deacon Adams rose through the political ranks, becoming a justice of the peace, a selectman, and a member of the Massachusetts House of Representatives. He worked closely with Elisha Cooke Jr. (1678–1737), the leader of the "popular party", a faction that resisted any encroachment by royal officials on the colonial rights embodied in the Massachusetts Charter of 1691. In the coming years, members of the "popular party" became known as Whigs or Patriots.

The younger Samuel Adams attended Boston Latin School and then entered Harvard College in 1736. His parents hoped that his schooling would prepare him for the ministry, but Adams gradually shifted his interest to politics. After graduating in 1740, Adams continued his studies, earning a master's degree in 1743. In his thesis, he argued that it was "lawful to resist the Supreme Magistrate, if the Commonwealth cannot otherwise be preserved", which indicated that his political views, like his father's, were oriented towards colonial rights.

Adams's life was greatly affected by his father's involvement in a banking controversy. In 1739, Massachusetts was facing a serious currency shortage, and Deacon Adams and the Boston Caucus created a "land bank" which issued paper money to borrowers who mortgaged their land as security. The land bank was generally supported by the citizenry and the popular party, which dominated the House of Representatives, the lower branch of the General Court. Opposition to the land bank came from the more aristocratic "court party", who were supporters of the royal governor Jonathan Belcher and controlled the Governor's Council, the upper chamber of the General Court. The court party used its influence to have the British Parliament dissolve the land bank in 1741. Directors of the land bank, including Deacon Adams, became personally liable for the currency still in circulation, payable in silver and gold. Lawsuits over the bank persisted for years, even after Deacon Adams's death, and the younger Samuel Adams often had to defend the family estate from seizure by the government. For Adams, these lawsuits "served as a constant personal reminder that Britain's power over the colonies could be exercised in arbitrary and destructive ways."

== Early career and family ==
After leaving Harvard in 1743, Adams was unsure about his future. He considered becoming a lawyer but instead decided to go into business. He worked at Thomas Cushing's counting house, but the job only lasted a few months because Cushing felt that Adams was too preoccupied with politics to become a good merchant. Adams's father then lent him £1,000 to go into business for himself, a substantial amount for that time. Adams's lack of business instincts were confirmed; he lent half of this money to a friend who never repaid, and frittered away the other half. Adams always remained, in the words of historian Pauline Maier, "a man utterly uninterested in either making or possessing money".

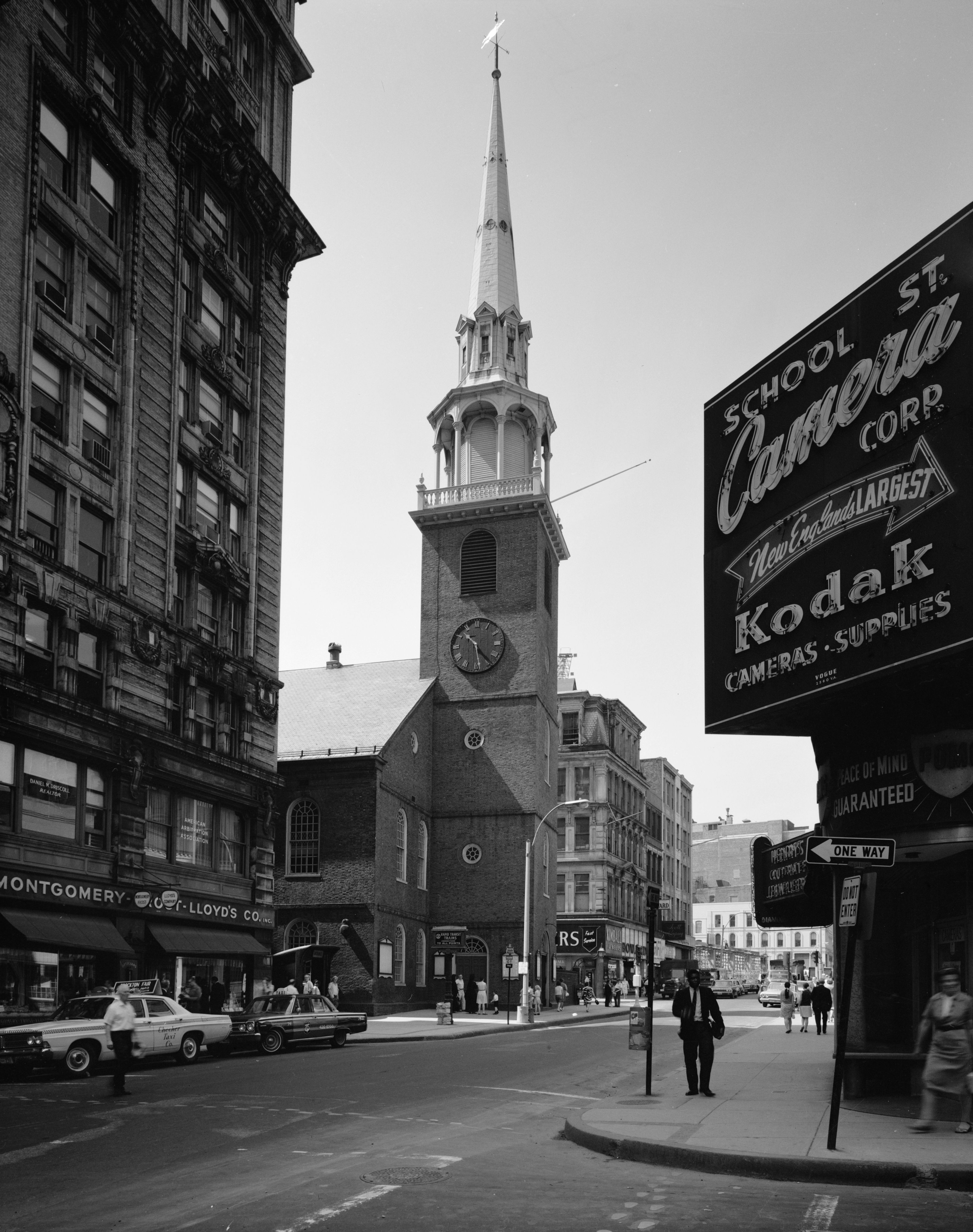
The Old South Meeting House (1968 photo shown) was Adams's church. During the crisis with Great Britain, mass meetings were held here that were too large for Faneuil Hall.

After Adams had lost his money, his father made him a partner in the family's malthouse, which was next to the family home on Purchase Street. Several generations of Adamses were maltsters, who produced the malt necessary for brewing beer. Years later, a poet poked fun at Adams by calling him "Sam the maltster". Adams has often been described as a brewer, but the extant evidence suggests that he worked as a maltster and not a brewer. (Note: Stoll, 2008 in Samuel Adams, notes that Jim Koch, founder of the Boston Beer Company, reports having been offered for purchase a receipt for hops signed by Adams, which indicates that Adams was a brewer, not just a maltster.) He also made financial decisions for the malthouse and had a position of influence in the business, which he lost due to his lack of understanding of the responsibilities of accounting and running a business, which led to many poor decisions that caused the malthouse to close.

In January 1748, Adams and some friends were inflamed by British impressment and launched The Independent Advertiser, a weekly newspaper that printed many political essays written by Adams. His essays drew heavily upon English political theorist John Locke's Second Treatise of Government, and they emphasized many of the themes that characterized his subsequent career. He argued that the people must resist any encroachment on their constitutional rights. He cited the decline of the Roman Empire as an example of what could happen to New England if it were to abandon its Puritan values.

When Deacon Adams died in 1748, Adams was given the responsibility of managing the family's affairs. In October 1749, he married Elizabeth Checkley, his pastor's daughter. Elizabeth gave birth to six children over the next seven years, but only two lived to adulthood: Samuel (born 1751) and Hannah (born 1756). In July 1757, Elizabeth died soon after giving birth to a stillborn son. Adams remarried in 1764 to Elizabeth Wells, but had no other children.

Like his father, Adams embarked on a political career with the support of the Boston Caucus. He was elected to his first political office in 1747, serving as one of the clerks of the Boston market. In 1756, the Boston Town Meeting elected him to the post of tax collector, which provided a small income. He often failed to collect taxes from his fellow citizens, which increased his popularity among those who did not pay, but left him liable for the shortage. By 1765, his account was more than £8,000 in arrears. The town meeting was on the verge of bankruptcy, and Adams was compelled to file suit against delinquent taxpayers, but many taxes went uncollected. In 1768, his political opponents used the situation to their advantage, obtaining a court judgment of £1,463 against him. Adams's friends paid off some of the deficit, and the town meeting wrote off the remainder. By then, he had emerged as a leader of the popular party, and the embarrassing situation did not lessen his influence.

== Conflict with Great Britain ==
Samuel Adams emerged as an important public figure in Boston soon after the British Empire's victory in the French and Indian War (1754–1763). The British Parliament found itself deep in debt and looking for new sources of revenue, and they sought to directly tax the colonies of British America for the first time. This tax dispute was part of a larger divergence between British and American interpretations of the British Constitution and the extent of Parliament's authority in the colonies.

In the years leading up to and into the revolution Adams made frequent use of colonial newspapers and began openly criticizing British colonial policy and by 1775 was advocating independence from Britain. Adams was foremost in actively using newspapers like the Boston Gazette to promote the ideals of colonial rights by publishing his letters and other accounts which sharply criticized British colonial policy and especially the practice of colonial taxation without representation.The Boston Gazette had a circulation of two thousand, published weekly, which was considerable number for that time. Its publishers, Benjamin Edes and John Gill, both founding members of the Sons of Liberty, were on friendly and cooperative terms with Adams, James Otis and the Boston Caucus. Historian Ralph Harlow maintains that there is no doubt of the influence these men had in arousing public feeling. In his writings in the Boston Gazette, Adams often wrote under a variety of assumed names, including "Candidus", "Vindex", and others. (Note: Other assumed names include "A Chatterer", "Alfred", "A Tory", "Valerius Poplicola". "A Freeholder", "A Puritan", "An American", "Determinus".) In less common instances his letters were unsigned.

Adams earnestly endeavored to awaken his fellow citizens over the perceived attacks on their Constitutional rights, with emphasis aimed at Massachusetts Governor Thomas Hutchinson. Hutchinson stressed that no one matched Adams's efforts in promoting the radical Whig position and the revolutionary cause, which Adams accordingly demonstrated with his numerous published and pointedly written essays and letters. In each of its issues from early September through mid-October 1771, the Gazette published Adams's inciteful essays, one of which criticized the Parliament for using colonial taxes to pay Hutchinson's annual salary of £2,000. In a letter of February 1770, published by the New York Journal (Note: Not to be confused with the New York Journal-American founded in 1882.) Adams maintained that it became increasingly difficult to view King George III as one who was not passively involved in Parliamentary decisions. In it he asked if anyone of common sense could deny that the King had assumed a “personal and decisive” role against the Americans.

=== Sugar Act ===
The first step in the new program was the Sugar Act 1764, which Adams saw as an infringement of longstanding colonial rights. Colonists were not represented in Parliament, he argued, and therefore they could not be taxed by that body; the colonists were represented by the colonial assemblies, and only they could levy taxes upon them. Adams expressed these views in May 1764, when the Boston Town Meeting elected its representatives to the Massachusetts House. As was customary, the town meeting provided the representatives with a set of written instructions, which Adams was selected to write. Adams highlighted what he perceived to be the dangers of taxation without representation:

For if our Trade may be taxed, why not our Lands? Why not the Produce of our Lands & everything we possess or make use of? This we apprehend annihilates our Charter Right to govern & tax ourselves. It strikes at our British privileges, which as we have never forfeited them, we hold in common with our Fellow Subjects who are Natives of Britain. If Taxes are laid upon us in any shape without our having a legal Representation where they are laid, are we not reduced from the Character of free Subjects to the miserable State of tributary Slaves?

"When the Boston Town Meeting approved the Adams instructions on May 24, 1764", writes historian John K. Alexander, "it became the first political body in America to go on record stating Parliament could not constitutionally tax the colonists. The directives also contained the first official recommendation that the colonies present a unified defense of their rights". Adams's instructions were published in newspapers and pamphlets, and he soon became closely associated with James Otis Jr., a member of the Massachusetts House famous for his defense of colonial rights. Otis boldly challenged the constitutionality of certain acts of Parliament, but he would not go as far as Adams, who was moving towards the conclusion that Parliament did not have sovereignty over the colonies.

=== Stamp Act ===
In 1765, Parliament passed the Stamp Act which required colonists to pay a new tax on most printed materials. News of the passage of the Stamp Act produced an uproar in the colonies. The colonial response echoed Adams's 1764 instructions. In June 1765, Otis called for a Stamp Act Congress to coordinate colonial resistance. The Virginia House of Burgesses passed a widely reprinted set of resolves against the Stamp Act that resembled Adams's arguments against the Sugar Act. Adams argued that the Stamp Act was unconstitutional; he also believed that it would hurt the economy of the British Empire. He supported calls for a boycott of British goods to put pressure on Parliament to repeal the tax.

In Boston, a group called the Loyal Nine, a precursor to the Sons of Liberty, organized protests of the Stamp Act. Adams was friendly with the Loyal Nine but was not a member. On August 14, stamp distributor Andrew Oliver was hanged in effigy from Boston's Liberty Tree; that night, his home was ransacked and his office demolished. On August 26, lieutenant governor Thomas Hutchinson's home was destroyed by an angry crowd.

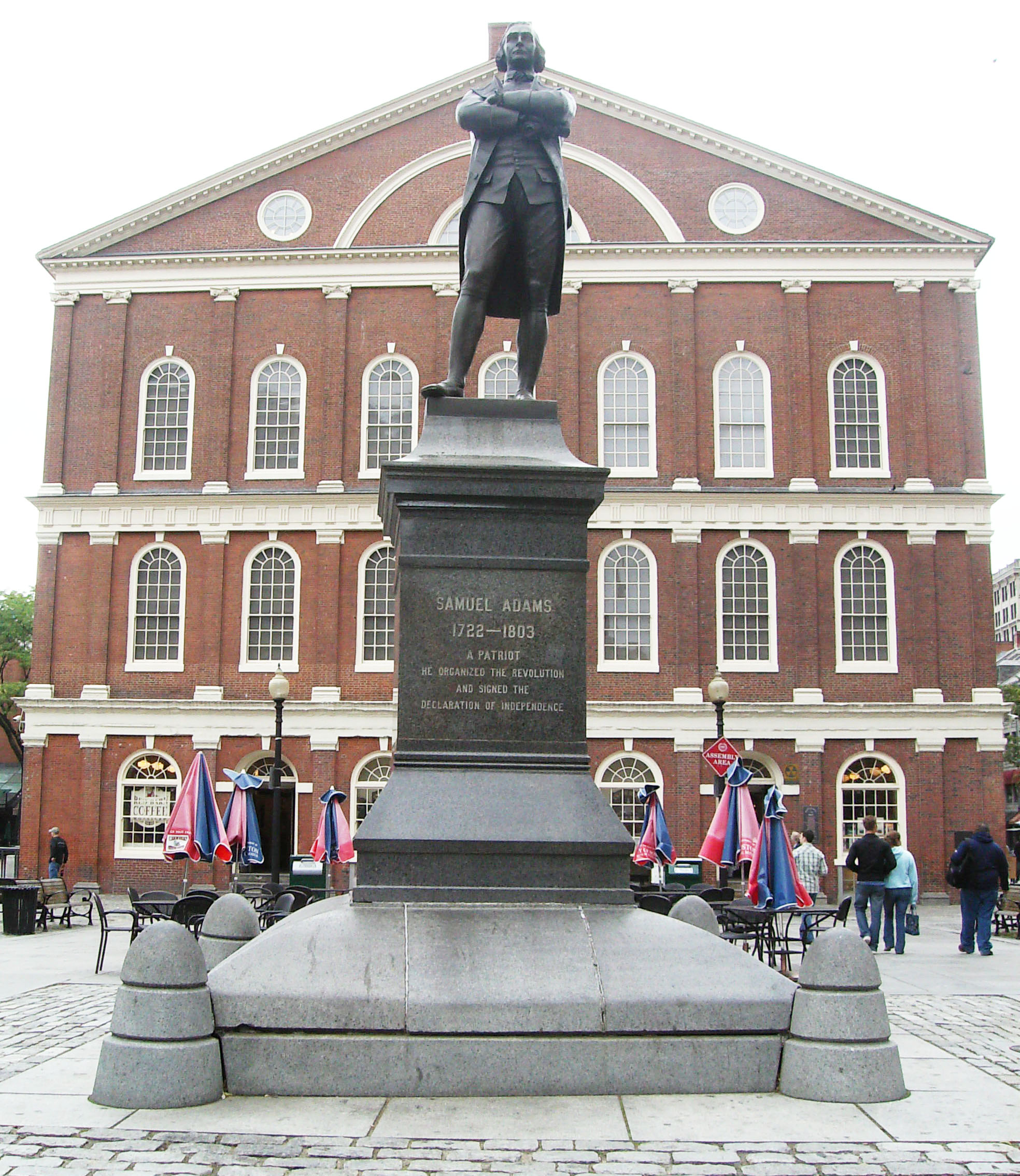
Anne Whitney, Samuel Adams, bronze and granite statue, 1880, located in front of Faneuil Hall, which was the home of the Boston Town Meeting

Officials such as Governor Francis Bernard believed that common people acted only under the direction of agitators and blamed the violence on Adams. This interpretation was revived by scholars in the early 20th century, who viewed Adams as a master of propaganda who manipulated mobs into doing his bidding. For example, historian John C. Miller wrote in 1936 in what became the standard biography of Adams that Adams "controlled" Boston with his "trained mob". Some modern scholars have argued that this interpretation is a myth, and that there is no evidence that Adams had anything to do with the Stamp Act riots. (Note: Fowler believes that Adams must have known about the attack on Hutchinson's home in advance, though he concedes that there are no records that link him to the incident.) After the fact, Adams did approve of the August 14 action because he saw no other legal options to resist what he viewed as an unconstitutional act by Parliament, but he condemned attacks on officials' homes as "mobbish". According to the modern scholarly interpretation of Adams, he supported legal methods of resisting parliamentary taxation, such as petitions, boycotts, and nonviolent demonstrations, but he opposed mob violence which he saw as illegal, dangerous, and counter-productive.

In September 1765, Adams was once again appointed by the Boston Town Meeting to write the instructions for Boston's delegation to the Massachusetts House of Representatives. As it turned out, he wrote his own instructions; on September 27, the town meeting selected him to replace the recently deceased Oxenbridge Thacher as one of Boston's four representatives in the assembly. James Otis was attending the Stamp Act Congress in New York City, so Adams was the primary author of a series of House resolutions against the Stamp Act, which were more radical than those passed by the Stamp Act Congress. Adams was one of the first colonial leaders to argue that mankind possessed certain natural rights that governments could not violate.

The Stamp Act was scheduled to go into effect on November 1, 1765, but it was not enforced because protestors throughout the colonies had compelled stamp distributors to resign. Eventually, British merchants were able to convince Parliament to repeal the tax. By May 16, 1766, news of the repeal had reached Boston. There was celebration throughout the city, and Adams made a public statement of thanks to British merchants for helping their cause.

The Massachusetts popular party gained ground in the May 1766 elections. Adams was re-elected to the House and selected as its clerk, in which position he was responsible for official House papers. In the coming years, Adams used his position as clerk to great effect in promoting his political message. Joining Adams in the House was John Hancock, a new representative from Boston. Hancock was a wealthy merchant—perhaps the richest man in Massachusetts—but a relative newcomer to politics. He was initially a protégé of Adams, and he used his wealth to promote the Whig cause.

=== Townshend Acts ===
After the repeal of the Stamp Act, Parliament took a different approach to raising revenue, passing the Townshend Acts in 1767 which established new duties on various goods imported into the colonies. These duties were relatively low because the British ministry wanted to establish the precedent that Parliament had the right to impose tariffs on the colonies before raising them. Revenues from these duties were to be used to pay for governors and judges who would be independent of colonial control. To enforce compliance with the new laws, the Townshend Acts created a customs agency known as the American Board of Custom Commissioners, which was headquartered in Boston.

Resistance to the Townshend Acts grew slowly. The General Court was not in session when news of the acts reached Boston in October 1767. Adams therefore used the Boston Town Meeting to organize an economic boycott, and called for other towns to do the same. By February 1768, towns in Massachusetts, Rhode Island, and Connecticut had joined the boycott. Opposition to the Townshend Acts was also encouraged by Letters from a Farmer in Pennsylvania, a series of popular essays by John Dickinson which started appearing in December 1767. Dickinson's argument that the new taxes were unconstitutional had been made before by Adams, but never to such a wide audience.

In January 1768, the Massachusetts House sent a petition to King George asking for his help. (Note: In London, the petition to the king was published, along with other documents, by Thomas Hollis under the title "The True Sentiments of America".) Adams and Otis requested that the House send the petition to the other colonies, along with what became known as the Massachusetts Circular Letter, which became "a significant milestone on the road to revolution". The letter written by Adams called on the colonies to join with Massachusetts in resisting the Townshend Acts. The House initially voted against sending the letter and petition to the other colonies but, after some politicking by Adams and Otis, it was approved on February 11.

British colonial secretary Lord Hillsborough, hoping to prevent a repeat of the Stamp Act Congress, instructed the colonial governors in America to dissolve the assemblies if they responded to the Massachusetts Circular Letter. He also directed Massachusetts Governor Francis Bernard to have the Massachusetts House rescind the letter. On June 30, the House refused to rescind the letter by a vote of 92 to 17, with Adams citing their right to petition as justification. Far from complying with the governor's order, Adams instead presented a new petition to the king asking that Governor Bernard be removed from office. Bernard responded by dissolving the legislature.

The commissioners of the Customs Board found that they were unable to enforce trade regulations in Boston, so they requested military assistance. Help came in the form of HMS Romney, a fifty-gun warship which arrived in Boston Harbor in May 1768. Tensions escalated after the captain of Romney began to impress local sailors. The situation exploded on June 10, when customs officials seized Liberty, a sloop owned by John Hancock—a leading critic of the Customs Board—for alleged customs violations. Sailors and marines came ashore from Romney to tow away Liberty, and a riot broke out. Things calmed down in the following days, but fearful customs officials packed up their families and fled for protection to Romney and eventually to Castle William, an island fort in the harbor.

Governor Bernard wrote to London in response to the Liberty incident and the struggle over the Circular Letter, informing his superiors that troops were needed in Boston to restore order. Lord Hillsborough ordered four regiments of the British Army to Boston.

=== Boston under occupation ===
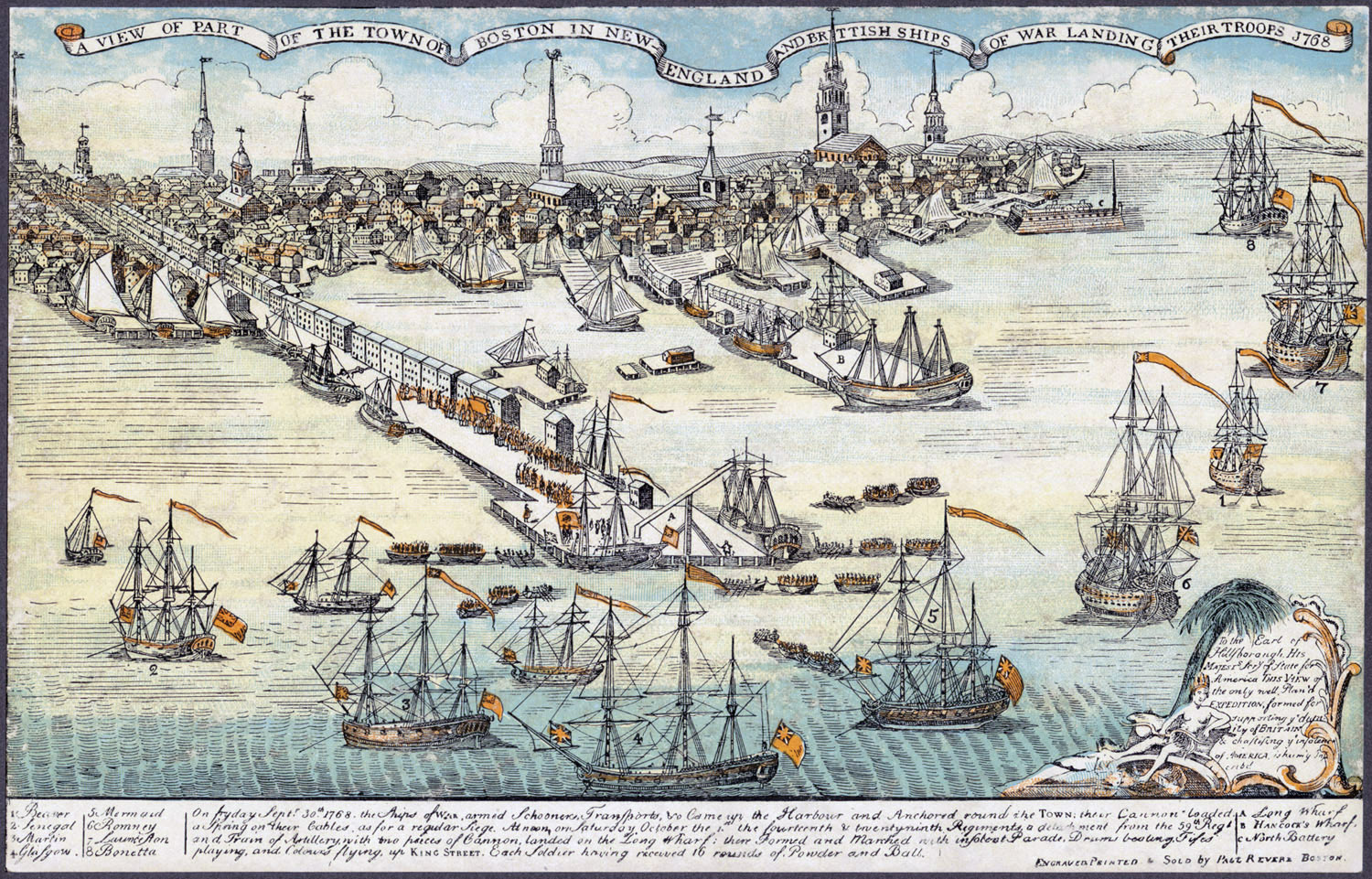
Paul Revere's 1768 engraving of British troops arriving in Boston was reprinted throughout the colonies.

Learning that British troops were on the way, the Boston Town Meeting met on September 12, 1768, and requested that Governor Bernard convene the General Court. Bernard refused, so the town meeting called on the other Massachusetts towns to send representatives to meet at Faneuil Hall beginning on September 22. About 100 towns sent delegates to the convention, which was effectively an unofficial session of the Massachusetts House. The convention issued a letter which insisted that Boston was not a lawless town, using language more moderate than what Adams desired, and that the impending military occupation violated Bostonians' natural, constitutional, and charter rights. By the time that the convention adjourned, British troop transports had arrived in Boston Harbor. Two regiments disembarked in October 1768, followed by two more in November.

According to some accounts, the occupation of Boston was a turning point for Adams, after which he gave up hope of reconciliation and secretly began to work towards American independence. However, historian Carl Becker wrote in 1928 that "there is no clear evidence in his contemporary writings that such was the case." Nevertheless, the traditional, standard view of Adams is that he desired independence before most of his contemporaries and steadily worked towards this goal for years. There is much speculation among historians, with compelling arguments either way, over whether and when before the war Adams openly advocated independence from Britain. Historian Pauline Maier challenged the idea that he had in 1980, arguing instead that Adams, like most of his peers, did not embrace independence until after the American Revolutionary War had begun in 1775. According to Maier, Adams at this time was a reformer rather than a revolutionary; he sought to have the British ministry change its policies, and warned Britain that independence would be the inevitable result of a failure to do so. Adams biographer Stewart Beach also questioned whether Adams sought independence before the mid-1770s, in that Hutchinson, who despised Adams, and had reason enough to, never once in his papers accused Adams of pushing the idea of independence from Britain, though he notes that Adams had publicly promised retaliation to any British troops sent over to quell the rebellion, moreover, that Adams was never accused of treason by the Parliament before the war.

Adams wrote numerous letters and essays in opposition to the occupation, which he considered a violation of the 1689 Bill of Rights. The occupation was publicized throughout the colonies in the Journal of Occurrences, an unsigned series of newspaper articles that may have been written by Adams in collaboration with others. The Journal presented what it claimed to be a factual daily account of events in Boston during the military occupation, an innovative approach in an era without professional newspaper reporters. Their articles primarily focused on the many grievances held by ordinary Bostonians toward the British occupation, including its subversion of civil authority and misbehavior by occupational troops. The Journal also criticized the British impressment of colonial sailors into the Royal Navy. The Journal ceased publication on August 1, 1769, which was a day of celebration in Boston, as Bernard had left Massachusetts, never to return.

Adams continued to work on getting British occupational troops to withdraw from Boston and keeping the boycott going until the Townshend duties were repealed. Two regiments were removed from Boston in 1769, but the other two remained. Tensions between occupational troops and local colonists eventually resulted in the killing of five Bostonians in the Boston Massacre of March 1770. According to the "propagandist interpretation" of Adams popularized by historian John Miller, Adams deliberately provoked the incident to promote his secret agenda of American independence. According to Pauline Maier, however, "There is no evidence that he prompted the Boston Massacre riot".

After the Boston Massacre, Adams and other town leaders met with Bernard's successor Governor Thomas Hutchinson and with Colonel William Dalrymple, the army commander, to demand the withdrawal of all occupational troops from Boston. The situation remained explosive, so Dalrymple agreed to remove both regiments to Castle William. Adams wanted the soldiers involved in the massacre to have a fair trial, because this would show that Boston was not controlled by a lawless mob, but was instead the victim of an unjust occupation. He convinced his cousins John Adams and Josiah Quincy to defend the soldiers, knowing that they would not slander Boston to gain an acquittal. However, Adams wrote essays condemning the outcome of the trials; he thought that the soldiers should have been convicted of murder.

=== "Quiet period" ===
After the Boston Massacre, politics in Massachusetts entered what is sometimes known as the "quiet period". In April 1770, Parliament repealed the Townshend duties, except for the tax on tea. Adams urged colonists to keep up the boycott of British goods, arguing that paying even one small tax allowed Parliament to establish the precedent of taxing the colonies, but the boycott faltered. As economic conditions improved, support waned for Adams's causes. In 1770, New York City and Philadelphia abandoned the non-importation boycott of British goods and Boston merchants faced the risk of being economically ruined, so they also agreed to end the boycott, effectively defeating Adams's cause in Massachusetts. John Adams withdrew from politics, while John Hancock and James Otis appeared to become more moderate. In 1771, Samuel Adams ran for the position of Register of Deeds, but he was beaten by Ezekiel Goldthwait by more than two to one. He was re-elected to the Massachusetts House in April 1772, but he received far fewer votes than ever before.

A struggle over the power of the purse brought Adams back into the political limelight. Traditionally, the Massachusetts House of Representatives paid the salaries of the governor, lieutenant governor, and superior court judges. From the Whig perspective, this arrangement was an important check on executive power, keeping royally appointed officials accountable to democratically elected representatives. In 1772, Massachusetts learned that those officials would henceforth be paid by the British government rather than by the province. (Note: Adams and others had previously suspected that Hutchinson's salary was being paid by the Crown; this had been unconfirmed until this development".) To protest this, Adams and his colleagues devised a system of committees of correspondence in November 1772; the towns of Massachusetts would consult with each other concerning political matters via messages sent through a network of committees that recorded British activities and protested imperial policies. Committees of correspondence soon formed in other colonies, as well.

Governor Hutchinson became concerned that the committees of correspondence were growing into an independence movement, so he convened the General Court in January 1773. Addressing the legislature, Hutchinson argued that denying the supremacy of Parliament, as some committees had done, came dangerously close to rebellion. "I know of no line that can be drawn", he said, "between the supreme authority of Parliament and the total independence of the colonies." Adams and the House responded that the Massachusetts Charter did not establish Parliament's supremacy over the province, and so Parliament could not claim that authority now. Hutchinson soon realized that he had made a major blunder by initiating a public debate about independence and the extent of Parliament's authority in the colonies. The Boston Committee of Correspondence published its statement of colonial rights, along with Hutchinson's exchange with the Massachusetts House, in the widely distributed "Boston Pamphlet".

The quiet period in Massachusetts was over. Adams was easily re-elected to the Massachusetts House in May 1773, and was also elected as moderator of the Boston Town Meeting. In June 1773, he introduced a set of private letters to the Massachusetts House, written by Hutchinson several years earlier. In one letter, Hutchinson recommended to London that there should be "an abridgement of what are called English liberties" in Massachusetts. Hutchinson denied that this is what he meant, but his career was effectively over in Massachusetts, and the House sent a petition asking the king to recall him. (Note: Hutchinson maintained that he was predicting a curtailment of liberty, rather than recommending it; for the modern scholarly analysis of the letters affair, see Bernard Bailyn, The Ordeal of Thomas Hutchinson (Cambridge, 1974).)

=== Boston Tea Party ===
Adams took a leading role in the events that led up to the famous Boston Tea Party of December 16, 1773, although the precise nature of his involvement has been disputed.

In May 1773, the British Parliament passed the Tea Act, a tax law to help the struggling East India Company, one of Great Britain's most important commercial institutions. Britons could buy smuggled Dutch tea more cheaply than the East India Company's tea because of the heavy taxes imposed on tea imported into Great Britain, and so the company amassed a huge surplus of tea that it could not sell. The British government's solution to the problem was to sell the surplus in the colonies. The Tea Act permitted the East India Company to export tea directly to the colonies for the first time, bypassing most of the merchants who had previously acted as middlemen. This measure was a threat to the American colonial economy because it granted the Tea Company a significant cost advantage over local tea merchants and even local tea smugglers, driving them out of business. The act also reduced the taxes on tea paid by the company in Britain, but kept the controversial Townshend duty on tea imported in the colonies. A few merchants in New York, Philadelphia, Boston, and Charlestown were selected to receive the company's tea for resale. In late 1773, seven ships were sent to the colonies carrying East India Company tea, including four bound for Boston.

News of the Tea Act set off a firestorm of protest in the colonies. This was not a dispute about high taxes; the price of legally imported tea was actually reduced by the Tea Act. Protesters were instead concerned with a variety of other issues. The familiar "no taxation without representation" argument remained prominent, along with the question of the extent of Parliament's authority in the colonies. Some colonists worried that, by buying the cheaper tea, they would be conceding that Parliament had the right to tax them. The "power of the purse" conflict was still at issue. The tea tax revenues were to be used to pay the salaries of certain royal officials, making them independent of the people. Colonial smugglers played a significant role in the protests, since the Tea Act made legally imported tea cheaper, which threatened to put smugglers of Dutch tea out of business. (Note: See also: John W. Tyler, Smugglers & Patriots: Boston Merchants and the Advent of the American Revolution (Boston, 1986) (in Further reading section)) Legitimate tea importers who had not been named as consignees by the East India Company were also threatened with financial ruin by the Tea Act and other merchants worried about the precedent of a government-created monopoly.

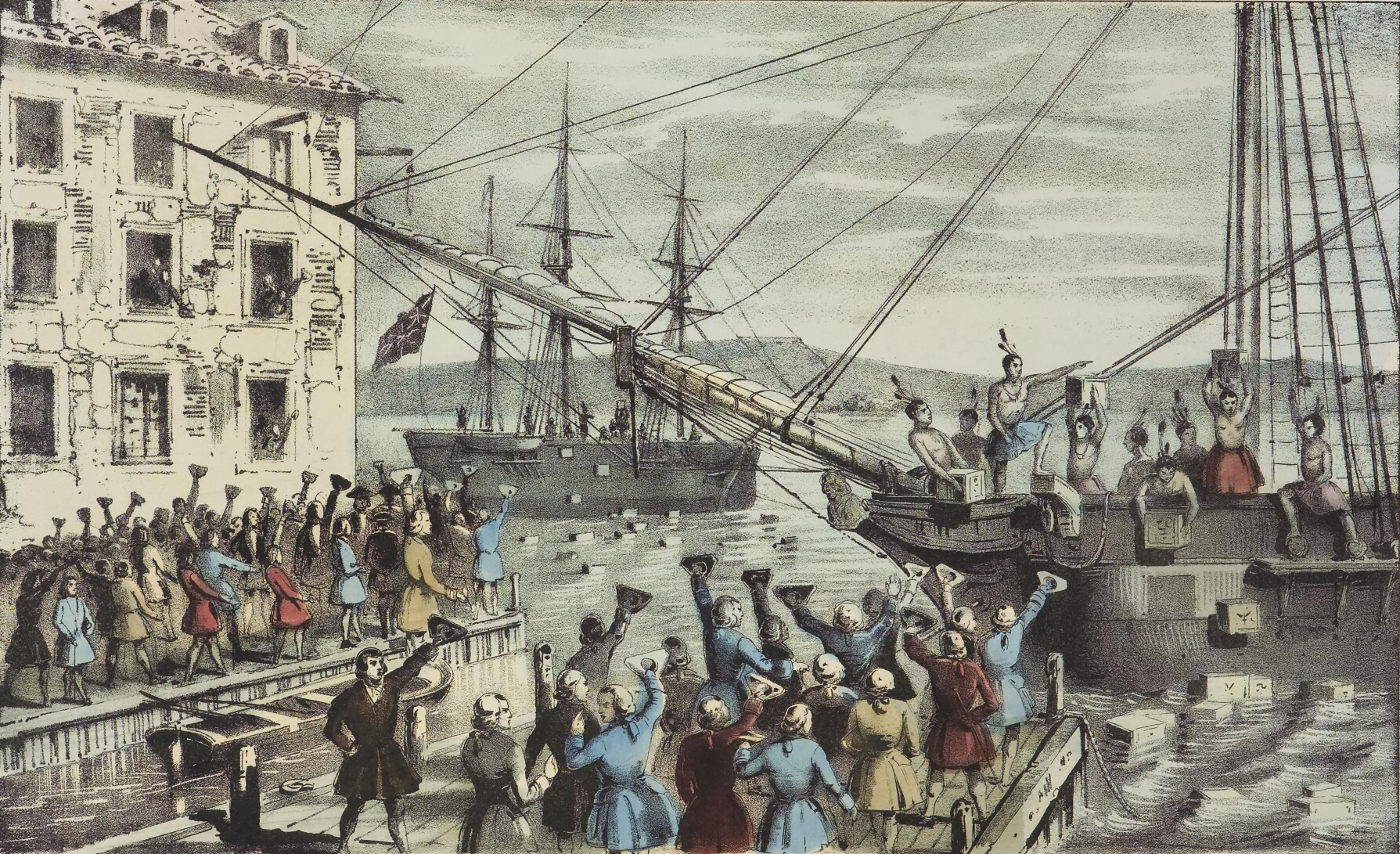
This iconic 1846 lithograph by Nathaniel Currier was entitled "The Destruction of Tea at Boston Harbor"; the phrase "Boston Tea Party" had not yet become standard.

Adams and the correspondence committees promoted opposition to the Tea Act. In every colony except Massachusetts, protesters were able to force the tea consignees to resign or to return the tea to England. In Boston, however, Governor Hutchinson was determined to hold his ground. He convinced the tea consignees, two of whom were his sons, not to back down. The Boston Caucus and then the Town Meeting attempted to compel the consignees to resign, but they refused. With the tea ships about to arrive, Adams and the Boston Committee of Correspondence contacted nearby committees to rally support.

The tea ship Dartmouth arrived in the Boston Harbor in late November, and Adams wrote a circular letter calling for a mass meeting to be held at Faneuil Hall on November 29. Thousands of people arrived, so many that the meeting was moved to the larger Old South Meeting House. British law required the Dartmouth to unload and pay the duties within twenty days or customs officials could confiscate the cargo. The mass meeting passed a resolution introduced by Adams urging the captain of the Dartmouth to send the ship back without paying the import duty. Meanwhile, the meeting assigned twenty-five men to watch the ship and prevent the tea from being unloaded.

Governor Hutchinson refused to grant permission for the Dartmouth to leave without paying the duty. Two more tea ships arrived in Boston Harbor, the Eleanor and the Beaver. The fourth ship, the William, was stranded near Cape Cod and never arrived in Boston. December 16 was the last day of the Dartmouth's deadline, and about 7,000 people gathered around the Old South Meeting House. Adams received a report that Governor Hutchinson had again refused to let the ships leave, and he announced, "This meeting can do nothing further to save the country." According to a popular story, Adams's statement was a prearranged signal for the "tea party" to begin. However, this claim did not appear in print until nearly a century after the event, in a biography of Adams written by his great-grandson, who apparently misinterpreted the evidence. According to eyewitness accounts, people did not leave the meeting until ten or fifteen minutes after Adams's alleged "signal", and Adams in fact tried to stop people from leaving because the meeting was not yet over. (Note: For firsthand accounts that contradict the story that Adams gave the signal for the tea party, see L. F. S. Upton, ed., "Proceeding of Ye Body Respecting the Tea", William and Mary Quarterly, Third Series, 22 (1965), 297–98; Francis S. Drake, Tea Leaves: Being a Collection of Letters and Documents, (Boston, 1884), LXX; Boston Evening Post, December 20, 1773; Boston Gazette, December 20, 1773; Massachusetts Gazette and Boston Weekly News-Letter, December 23, 1773.)

While Adams tried to reassert control of the meeting, people poured out of the Old South Meeting House and headed to Boston Harbor. That evening, a group of 30 to 130 men boarded the three vessels, some of them thinly disguised as Mohawk Indians, and dumped all 342 chests of tea into the water over the course of three hours. Adams never revealed whether he went to the wharf to witness the destruction of the tea. Whether or not he helped plan the event is unknown, but Adams immediately worked to publicize and defend it. He argued that the Tea Party was not the act of a lawless mob, but was instead a principled protest and the only remaining option that the people had to defend their constitutional rights.

== Revolution ==
Great Britain responded to the Boston Tea Party in 1774 with the Coercive Acts. The first of these acts was the Boston Port Act, which closed Boston's commerce until the East India Company had been repaid for the destroyed tea. The Massachusetts Government Act rewrote the Massachusetts Charter, making many officials royally appointed rather than elected, and severely restricting the activities of town meetings. The Administration of Justice Act allowed colonists charged with crimes to be transported to another colony or to Great Britain for trial. A new royal governor was appointed to enforce the acts: General Thomas Gage, who was also commander of British military forces in North America.

Adams worked to coordinate resistance to the Coercive Acts. In May 1774, the Boston Town Meeting (with Adams serving as moderator) organized an economic boycott of British goods. In June, Adams headed a committee in the Massachusetts House—with the doors locked to prevent Gage from dissolving the legislature—which proposed that an inter-colonial congress meet in Philadelphia in September. He was one of five delegates chosen to attend the First Continental Congress. Adams was never fashionably dressed and had little money, so friends bought him new clothes and paid his expenses for the journey to Philadelphia, his first trip outside of Massachusetts.

=== First Continental Congress ===
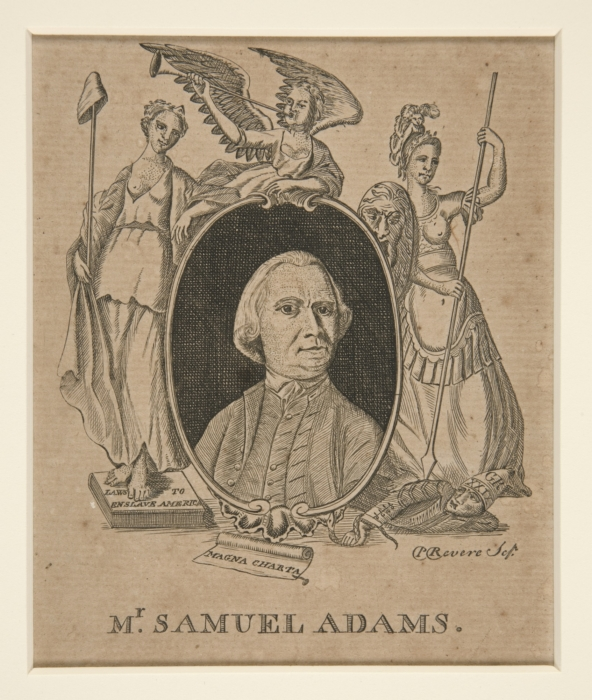
Adams as portrayed by Paul Revere, 1774. Yale University Art Gallery.

In Philadelphia, Adams promoted colonial unity while using his political skills to lobby other delegates. On September 16, messenger Paul Revere brought Congress the Suffolk Resolves, one of many resolutions passed in Massachusetts that promised strident resistance to the Coercive Acts. Congress endorsed the Suffolk Resolves, issued a Declaration of Rights that denied Parliament's right to legislate for the colonies, and organized a colonial boycott known as the Continental Association.

Adams returned to Massachusetts in November 1774, where he served in the Massachusetts Provincial Congress, an extralegal legislative body independent of British control. The Provincial Congress created the first minutemen companies, consisting of militiamen who were to be ready for action on a moment's notice. Adams also served as moderator of the Boston Town Meeting, which convened despite the Massachusetts Government Act, and was appointed to the Committee of Inspection to enforce the Continental Association. He was also selected to attend the Second Continental Congress, scheduled to meet in Philadelphia in May 1775.

John Hancock had been added to the delegation, and he and Adams attended the Provincial Congress in Concord, Massachusetts, before Adams's journey to the second Congress. The two men decided that it was not safe to return to Boston before leaving for Philadelphia, so they stayed at Hancock's childhood home in Lexington. On April 14, 1775, General Gage received a letter from Lord Dartmouth advising him "to arrest the principal actors and abettors in the Provincial Congress whose proceedings appear in every light to be acts of treason and rebellion". On the night of April 18, Gage sent out a detachment of soldiers on the fateful mission that sparked the American Revolutionary War. The purpose of the British expedition was to seize and destroy military supplies that the colonists had stored in Concord. According to many historical accounts, Gage also instructed his men to arrest Hancock and Adams, but the written orders issued by Gage made no mention of arresting the Patriot leaders. Gage had evidently decided against seizing Adams and Hancock, but Patriots initially believed otherwise, perhaps influenced by London newspapers that reached Boston with the news that the patriot leader would be hanged if he were caught. From Boston, Joseph Warren dispatched Paul Revere to warn the two that British troops were on the move and might attempt to arrest them. As Hancock and Adams made their escape, the first shots of the war began at Lexington and Concord. Soon after the battle, Gage issued a proclamation granting a general pardon to all who would "lay down their arms, and return to the duties of peaceable subjects"—with the exceptions of Hancock and Samuel Adams. Singling out Hancock and Adams in this manner only added to their renown among Patriots and, according to Patriot historian Mercy Otis Warren, perhaps exaggerated the importance of the two men.

=== Second Continental Congress ===
In John Trumbull's Declaration of Independence, Adams is seated to the viewer's right of Richard Henry Lee, whose legs are crossed in the front row.

The Continental Congress worked under a secrecy rule, so Adams's precise role in congressional deliberations is not fully documented. He appears to have had a major influence, working behind the scenes as a sort of "parliamentary whip" and Thomas Jefferson credits Samuel Adams—the lesser-remembered Adams—with steering the Congress toward independence, saying, "If there was any Palinurus to the Revolution, Samuel Adams was the man." He served on numerous committees, often dealing with military matters. Among his more noted acts, Adams nominated George Washington to be commander in chief over the Continental Army.

Adams was a cautious advocate for a declaration of independence, urging eager correspondents back in Massachusetts to wait for more moderate colonists to come around to supporting separation from Great Britain. He was pleased in 1775 when the colonies began to replace their old governments with independent republican governments. He praised Thomas Paine's popular pamphlet Common Sense, writing as "Candidus" in early 1776, and supported the call for American independence. On June 7, Adams's political ally Richard Henry Lee introduced a three-part resolution calling for Congress to declare independence, create a colonial confederation, and seek foreign aid. After a delay to rally support, Congress approved the language of the United States Declaration of Independence on July 4, 1776, which Adams signed.

When he returned to Congress, they continued to manage the war effort. Adams served on military committees, including an appointment to the Board of War in 1777. He advocated paying bonuses to Continental Army soldiers to encourage them to reenlist for the duration of the war. He called for harsh state legislation to punish Loyalists, writing that their "secret Machinations" posed "a greater threat to the glorious cause than the British military did." In Massachusetts, more than 300 Loyalists were banished and their property confiscated by the state government. After the war, Adams opposed allowing Loyalists to return to Massachusetts, fearing that they would work to undermine republican government.

Adams was the Massachusetts delegate appointed to the committee to draft the Articles of Confederation, the plan for the colonial confederation. With its emphasis on state sovereignty, the Articles reflected Congress's wariness of a strong central government, a concern shared by Adams. Like others at the time, Adams considered himself a citizen of the United States while continuing to refer to Massachusetts as his "country". After much debate, the Articles were sent to the states for ratification in November 1777. From Philadelphia, Adams urged Massachusetts to ratify, which it did. Adams signed the Articles of Confederation with the other Massachusetts delegates in 1778, but they were not ratified by all the states until 1781.

Adams returned to Boston in 1779 to attend a state constitutional convention. The Massachusetts General Court had proposed a new constitution the previous year, but voters rejected it, and so a convention was held to try again. Adams was appointed to a three-man drafting committee with his cousin John Adams and James Bowdoin. They drafted the Massachusetts Constitution, which was amended by the convention and approved by voters in 1780. The new constitution established a republican form of government, with annual elections and a separation of powers. It reflected Adams's belief that "a state is never free except when each citizen is bound by no law whatever that he has not approved of, either directly, or through his representatives". By modern standards, the new constitution was not "democratic"; Adams, like most of his peers, believed that only free males who owned property should be allowed to vote, and that the senate and the governor served to balance any excesses that might result from majority rule.

In 1781, Adams retired from the Continental Congress. His health was one reason; he was approaching his sixtieth birthday and suffered from tremors that made writing difficult. But he also wanted to return to Massachusetts to influence politics in the Commonwealth. He returned to Boston in 1781, and never left Massachusetts again.

=== Move to Dedham ===
During the Revolution, Adams returned to Massachusetts from the Continental Congress for a two-month break. He found his home on Purchase Street had been destroyed. The windowpanes were etched with insults and caricatures were drawn on the walls. His garden was trampled, the outbuildings knocked down, and the house was robbed of all its furnishings. Adams was unable to fix the house, so he moved his family to Dedham.

== Return to Massachusetts ==
Adams remained active in politics upon his return to Massachusetts. He lived in a run down house on Winter Street in Boston that had been confiscated from its Loyalist owner. He frequently served as moderator of the Boston Town Meeting, and was elected to the state senate, where he often served as that body's president.

Adams focused his political agenda on promoting virtue, which he considered essential in a republican government. If republican leaders lacked virtue, he believed, liberty was endangered. His major opponent in this campaign was his former protégé John Hancock; the two men had a falling out in the Continental Congress. Adams disapproved of what he viewed as Hancock's vanity and extravagance, which Adams believed were inappropriate in a republican leader. When Hancock left Congress in 1777, Adams and the other Massachusetts delegates voted against thanking him for his service as president of Congress. The struggle continued in Massachusetts. Adams thought that Hancock was not acting the part of a virtuous republican leader by acting like an aristocrat and courting popularity. Adams favored James Bowdoin for governor, and was distressed when Hancock won annual landslide victories.

Adams's promotion of public virtue took several forms. He played a major role in getting Boston to provide a free public education for children, even for girls, which was controversial. Adams was one of the charter members of the American Academy of Arts and Sciences in 1780. After the Revolutionary War, Adams joined others, including Thomas Jefferson, in denouncing the Society of the Cincinnati, an organization of former army officers. Adams worried that the Society was "a stride towards an hereditary military nobility", and thus a threat to republicanism. Adams also believed that public theaters undermined civic virtue, and he joined an ultimately unsuccessful effort to keep theaters banned in Boston. Decades after Adams's death, orator Edward Everett called him "the last of the Puritans".

I firmly believe that the benevolent Creator designed the republican Form of Government for Man.

— Samuel Adams, April 14, 1785

Postwar economic troubles in western Massachusetts led to an uprising known as Shays' Rebellion, which began in 1786. Small farmers, angered by high taxes and debts, armed themselves and shut down debtor courts in Worcester and Hampshire Counties, prompting Governor James Bowdoin to consult Adams first. Adams at a Boston town meeting oversaw the drafting of a circular letter that denounced these actions as unconstitutional and as acts treason. As Massachusetts's senator representing Boston, Adams played an important role in forming Governor Bowdoin's hard-line policy to suppress the rebellion. His old political ally James Warren thought that Adams had forsaken his principles, but Adams saw no contradiction. He approved of rebellion against an unrepresentative government, as had happened during the American Revolution, but he opposed taking up arms against a republican government, composed of fellow American citizens, where problems should be remedied through elections. He thought that the leaders of Shays's Rebellion should be hanged, reportedly saying that "the man who dares to rebel against the laws of a republic ought to suffer death", and urged Governor Bowdoin to use military force, who obliged and sent four thousand militiamen to put down the uprising.

Shays's Rebellion contributed to the belief that the Articles of Confederation needed to be revised. In 1787, delegates to the Philadelphia Convention, instead of revising the Articles, created a new United States Constitution with a much stronger national government. The Constitution was sent to the states for ratification, when Adams expressed his displeasure. "I confess", he wrote to Richard Henry Lee on Boston December 3, 1787, "as I enter the Building I stumble at the Threshold. I meet with a National Government, instead of a Federal Union of States." Adams was one of those derisively labeled "Anti-Federalists" by proponents of the new Constitution, who called themselves "Federalists". Adams was elected to the Massachusetts ratifying convention which met in January 1788. Despite his reservations, Adams rarely spoke at the convention, and listened carefully to the arguments rather than raising objections. Adams and John Hancock had reconciled, and they finally agreed to give their support for the Constitution, with the proviso that some amendments be added later. Even with the support of Hancock and Adams, the Massachusetts convention narrowly ratified the Constitution by a vote of 187 to 168.

While Adams was attending the ratifying convention, his only son Samuel Adams Jr. died at just 37 years of age. The younger Adams had served as surgeon in the Revolutionary War, but had fallen ill and never fully recovered. The death was a stunning blow to the elder Adams. The younger Adams left his father the certificates that he had earned as a soldier, giving Adams and his wife unexpected financial security in their final years. Investments in land made them relatively wealthy by the mid-1790s, but this did not alter their frugal lifestyle.

Adams was concerned about the new Constitution and made an attempt to re-enter national politics. He allowed his name to be put forth as a candidate for the House of Representatives in the December 1788 election, but lost to Fisher Ames, apparently because Ames was a stronger supporter of the Constitution, a more popular position. Adams belonged to the school of revolutionary crusaders, whose purpose and influence became obscured by 1776 and all but disappeared by war's end. By the late 1780s Adams appeared to be an aging politician whose glory days were obscured by present-day constitutional issues. Ames, however, belonged to the group of constructive statesmen who built up out of the wreck of revolution and strived to bring the young nation into a rapidly changing world by establishing a strong federal constitution. During this time the newspapers outlined the stark contrast in politics between Adams and Ames in their pages. Despite his defeat, Adams continued to work for amendments to the Constitution, a movement that ultimately resulted in the addition of a Bill of Rights in 1791. Adams subsequently became a firm supporter of the Constitution, with these amendments and the possibility of more.

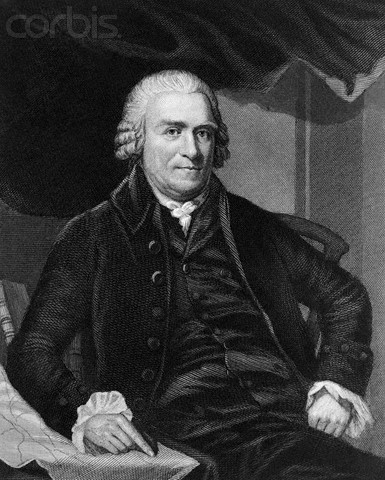
Samuel Adams as he looked in 1795 when he was Governor of Massachusetts. The original portrait was destroyed by fire; this is a mezzotint copy.

In 1789, Adams was elected Lieutenant Governor of Massachusetts and served in that office until Governor Hancock's death in 1793, when he became acting governor. The next year, Adams was elected as governor in his own right, the first of four annual terms. He was generally regarded as the leader of his state's Jeffersonian Republicans, who were opposed to the Federalist Party. Unlike some other Republicans, Adams supported the suppression of the Whiskey Rebellion in 1794 for the same reasons that he had opposed Shays's Rebellion. Like his fellow Republicans, he spoke out against the Jay Treaty in 1796, a position that drew criticism in a state that was increasingly Federalist. In that year's U. S. presidential election, Republicans in Virginia cast 15 electoral votes for Adams in an effort to make him Jefferson's vice-president, but Federalist John Adams won the election, with Jefferson becoming vice-president. The Adams cousins remained friends, but Samuel was pleased when Jefferson defeated John Adams in the 1800 presidential election.

Samuel Adams took a cue from President Washington, who declined to run for reelection in 1796: he retired from politics at the end of his term as governor in 1797. Adams suffered from what is now believed to have been essential tremor, a movement disorder that rendered him unable to write in the final decade of his life. He died at the age of 81 on October 2, 1803, and was interred at the Granary Burying Ground in Boston. Boston's Republican newspaper the Independent Chronicle eulogized him as "the Father of the American Revolution".

== Legacy ==
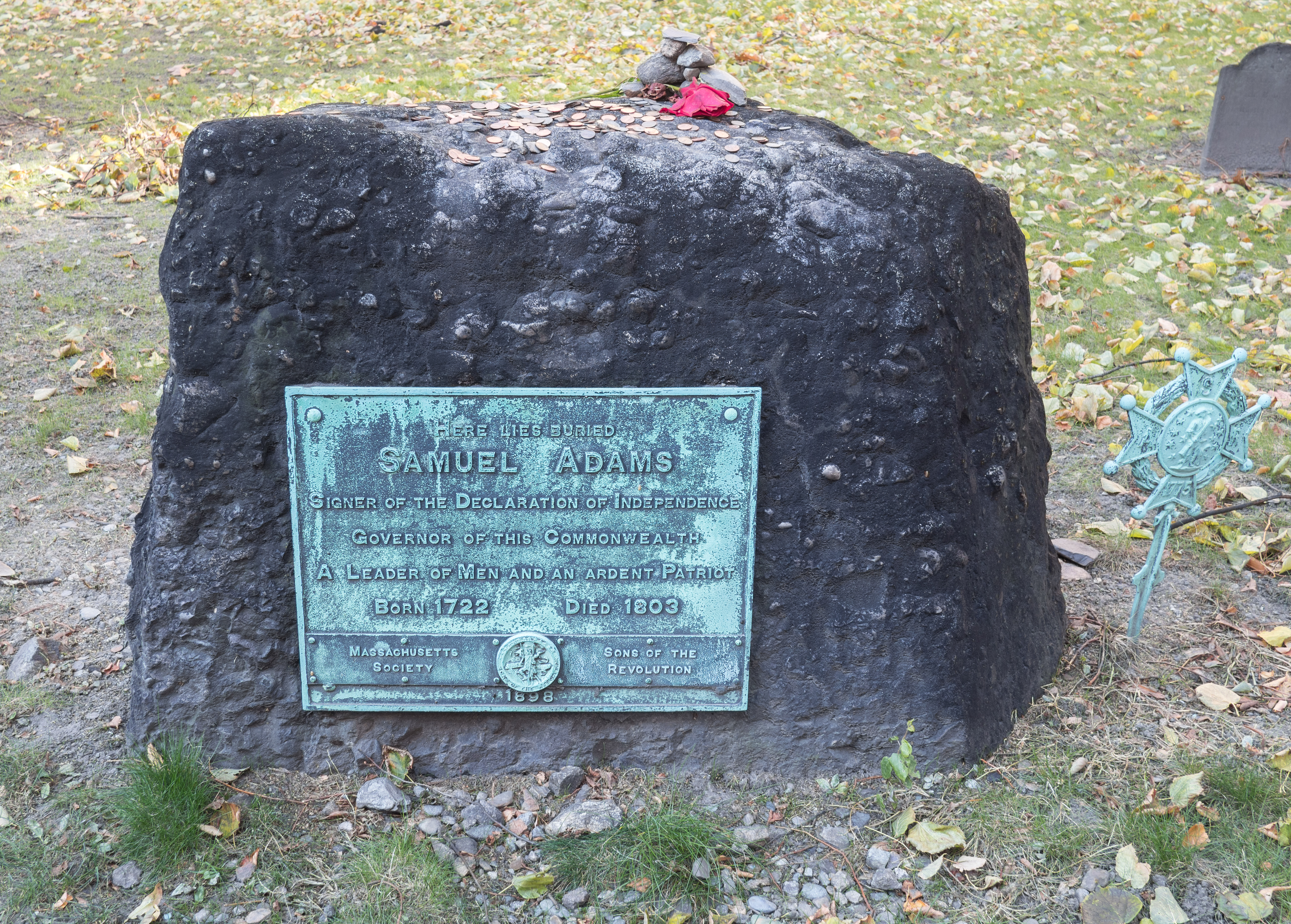
Samuel Adams grave marker in the Granary Burying Ground

Samuel Adams is a controversial figure in American history. Disagreement about his significance and reputation began before his death and continues to the present.

Adams's contemporaries, both friends and foes, regarded him as one of the foremost leaders of the American Revolution. Thomas Jefferson, for example, characterized Adams as "truly the Man of the Revolution." Leaders in other colonies were compared to him; Cornelius Harnett was called the "Samuel Adams of North Carolina", Charles Thomson the "Samuel Adams of Philadelphia", and Christopher Gadsden the "Sam Adams of the South". When John Adams traveled to France during the Revolution, he had to explain that he was not Samuel, "the famous Adams".

Supporters of the Revolution praised Adams, but Loyalists viewed him as a sinister figure. Peter Oliver, the exiled chief justice of Massachusetts, characterized him as a devious Machiavellian with a "cloven Foot". Thomas Hutchinson, Adams's political foe, took his revenge in his History of Massachusetts Bay, in which he denounced him as a dishonest character assassin, emphasizing his failures as a businessman and tax collector. This hostile "Tory interpretation" of Adams was revived in the 20th century by historian Clifford K. Shipton in the Sibley's Harvard Graduates reference series. Shipton wrote positive portraits of Hutchinson and Oliver and scathing sketches of Adams and Hancock; his entry on Adams was characterized by historian Pauline Maier as "forty-five pages of contempt".

Whig historians challenged the "Tory interpretation" of Adams. William Gordon and Mercy Otis Warren, two historians who knew Adams, wrote of him as a man selflessly dedicated to the American Revolution. But in the early 19th century, Adams was often viewed as an old-fashioned Puritan, and was consequently neglected by historians. Interest in Adams was revived in the mid-19th century. Historian George Bancroft portrayed him favorably in his monumental History of the United States from the Discovery of the American Continent (1852). The first full biography of Adams appeared in 1865, a three-volume work written by William Wells, his great-grandson. The Wells biography is still valuable for its wealth of information, although Whig portrayals of Adams were uncritically pro-American and had elements of hagiography, a view that influenced some later biographies written for general audiences.

Adams's writings include letters and essays, many of which were published in colonial newspapers like the Boston Gazette. These works were collected, edited and published in a four-volume work (1906–08) edited by Harry A. Cushing. In the preface of this work, Cushing asserts that, "The writings of no one of the leaders of the American Revolution form a more complete expression of the causes and justification of that movement than do those of Samuel Adams.

In the late 19th century, many American historians were uncomfortable with contemporary revolutions and found it problematic to write approvingly about Adams. Relations had improved between the United States and the United Kingdom, and Adams's role in dividing Americans from Britons was increasingly viewed with regret. In 1885, James Hosmer wrote a biography that praised Adams, but also found some of his actions troubling, such as the 1773 publication of Hutchinson's private letters. Subsequent biographers became increasingly hostile towards Adams and the common people whom he represented. In 1923, Ralph V. Harlow used a "Freudian" approach to characterize Adams as a "neurotic crank" driven by an "inferiority complex". (Note: See Harlow, 1923:Samuel Adams, Promoter of the American Revolution: A Study in Psychology and Politics.) Harlow argued that, because the masses were easily misled, Adams "manufactured public opinion" to produce the Revolution, a view that became the thesis of John C. Miller's 1936 biography Sam Adams: Pioneer in Propaganda. Miller portrayed Adams more as an incendiary revolutionary than an adroit political operative, attributing to this one man all the acts of Boston's "body of the people", and consistently calling his subject "Sam", despite the fact that Adams was almost always known as "Samuel" in his lifetime.

Miller's influential book became, in the words of historian Charles Akers, the "scholarly enshrinement" of "the myth of Sam Adams as the Boston dictator who almost single-handedly led his colony into rebellion". According to Akers, Miller and other historians used "Sam did it" to explain crowd actions and other developments, without citing any evidence that Adams directed those events. In 1974, Akers called on historians to critically re-examine the sources rather than simply repeating the myth. By then, scholars were increasingly rejecting the notion that Adams and others used "propaganda" to incite "ignorant mobs", and were instead portraying a revolutionary Massachusetts too complex to have been controlled by one man. Historian Pauline Maier argued that Adams, far from being a radical mob leader, took a moderate position based on the English revolutionary tradition that imposed strict constraints on resistance to authority. That belief justified force only against threats to the constitutional rights so grave that the "body of the people" recognized the danger, and only after all peaceful means of redress had failed. Within that revolutionary tradition, resistance was essentially conservative. In 2004, Ray Raphael's Founding Myths continued Maier's line by deconstructing several of the "Sam" Adams myths that are still repeated in many textbooks and popular histories.

Samuel Adams's name has been used by commercial and non-profit ventures since his death. The Boston Beer Company created Samuel Adams Boston Lager in 1985, drawing upon the tradition that Adams had been a brewer; it became a popular award-winning brand. Adams's name is also used by a pair of non-profit organizations, the Sam Adams Alliance and the Sam Adams Foundation. These groups take their names from Adams in homage to his ability to organize citizens at the local level to achieve a national goal.

In her 2022 biography of Adams, Stacy Schiff writes that Adams "operated by stealth, melting into committees and crowd actions, pseudonyms and smoky back rooms."

== See also ==
- Early American publishers and printers
- Memorial to the 56 Signers of the Declaration of Independence

== Bibliography ==
- Akers, Charles W. (March 1974). "Review: Sam Adams-And Much More". The New England Quarterly. 47 (1). The New England Quarterly, Inc.: 120–131. doi:10.2307/364333. JSTOR 364333. "Reviewed Work: Political Parties in Revolutionary Massachusetts by Stephen E. Patterson"
- Alden, John R. "Why the March to Concord?" The American Historical Review 49 (1944): 446–54.
- Alexander, John K. (2002). Samuel Adams: America's Revolutionary Politician. Lanham, Maryland: Rowman & Littlefield. p. 249. ISBN 0-7425-2115-X.
- Bailyn, Bernard (1992) [1967]. The Ideological Origins of the American Revolution (enlarged ed.). Harvard University Press. ISBN 0-674-44302-0.
- Baron, Stanley Wade (1962). Brewed in America: The History of Beer and Ale in the United States. Boston: Little, Brown. pp. 462. LCCN 62009546. OCLC 428916.
- Beach, Stewart (1965). Samuel Adams; the fateful years, 1764-1776. New York, Dodd, Mead.
- Becker, Carl L. (1928). Samuel Adams. Vol. 1. New York: Scribner and sons: Dictionary of American Biography.
- Burgan, Michael (2005). Samuel Adams : patriot and statesman. Minneapolis, Minn.: Compass Point Books. ISBN 978-0-7565-08234.
- Cushing, Harry Alonzo (1904). The writings of Samuel Adams. Vol. I. New York : G.P. Putnam's Sons.
- —— (1906). The writings of Samuel Adams. Vol. II. New York : G.P. Putnam's Sons.
- —— (1907). The writings of Samuel Adams. Vol. III. New York : G.P. Putnam's Sons.
- —— (1908). The writings of Samuel Adams. Vol. IV. New York : G.P. Putnam's Sons.
- Ferguson, Niall, "The Square and the Tower: Networks and Power from the Freemasons to Facebook", (2018), pp. 107–109.
- Chernow, Ron (2010). Washington: A Life. Penguin Press. ISBN 978-1-59420-266-7.
- Fischer, David H. Paul Revere's Ride. New York: Oxford University Press, 1994. ISBN 0-19-508847-6
- Fowler, William M.; Fowler, Lillian M. (January 1, 1997). Handlin, Oscar (ed.). Samuel Adams: Radical Puritan. New York: Longman. p. 190. ISBN 0-673-99293-4.
- Harlow, Ralph Volney (1923). Samuel Adams, promoter of the American revolution; Promoter of the American Revolution: A Study in Psychology and Politics. New York, H. Holt and company.
- Hosmer, James K. (1885). Samuel Adams. Boston: Houghton Mifflin. p. 469.
- Labaree, Benjamin Woods (1979). The Boston Tea Party. Boston: Northeastern University Press. ISBN 0-930350-05-7.
- Maier, Pauline (1976). "Coming to Terms with Samuel Adams". The American Historical Review. 81 (1): 12–37. doi:10.2307/1863739. JSTOR 1863739.
- —— (1991) [1972]. From Resistance to Revolution: Colonial Radicals and the Development of American Opposition to Britain, 1765–1776. New York: Knopf. ISBN 0-394-46190-8.
- —— (1980). The Old Revolutionaries: Political Lives in the Age of Samuel Adams. New York: Knopf Doubleday Publishing Group. p. 309. ISBN 0-394-51096-8.
- Miller, John Chester (1936). Sam Adams: Pioneer in Propaganda. Boston: Little, Brown. p. 437. LCCN 36022485. OCLC 1149092171.
- Nobles, Gregory. "Yet the Old Republicans Still Persevere: Samuel Adams, John Hancock, and the Crisis of Popular Leadership in Revolutionary Massachusetts, 1775–90". In Ronald Hoffman and Peter J. Albert, eds., The Transforming Hand of Revolution: Reconsidering the American Revolution as a Social Movement, 258–85. Charlottesville: University Press of Virginia, 1995. ISBN 0-8139-1561-9.
- O'Toole, James M. (March 1976). "The Historical Interpretations of Samuel Adams". New England Quarterly. 49 (1): 82–96. doi:10.2307/364558. JSTOR 364558.
- Pencak, William (March 1989). "Samuel Adams and Shays's Rebellion". The New England Quarterly. 62 (1). The New England Quarterly, Inc.: 63–74. doi:10.2307/366210. JSTOR 366210.
- Puls, Mark (2006). Samuel Adams: Father of the American Revolution. New York: St. Martin's Press. p. 273. ISBN 1-4039-7582-5.
- Raphael, Ray (2004). Founding Myths: Stories That Hide Our Patriotic Past. New York: The New Press. pp. 354. ISBN 1-56584-921-3.
- Schiff, Stacy (2022). The Revolutionary: Samuel Adams. Little, Brown & Co. ISBN 9780316441117.
- Stoll, Ira (2008). Samuel Adams: A Life. Simon and Schuster. ISBN 978-1-4165-94567.
- Thomas, Isaiah (1874). The history of printing in America, with a biography of printers. Vol. I. New York, B. Franklin.
- Thomas, Peter David Garner (1987). The Townshend Duties Crisis: The Second Phase of the American Revolution, 1767-1773. Clarendon Press. ISBN 978-0-1982-29674.
- Wells, William V. (1865). The Life and Public Services of Samuel Adams: Being a Narrative of His Acts and Opinions, and of His Agency in Producing and Forwarding the American Revolution, with Extracts From His Correspondence, State Papers, and Political Essays. Vol. 3. Boston: Little, Brown. p. 540.

== Citations ==
Massachusetts Senate
Preceded by Jeremiah Powell; Samuel Phillips Jr.	President of the Massachusetts Senate; 1782–1785; 1787–1788	Succeeded by Samuel Phillips Jr.
Political offices
Preceded by Benjamin Lincoln	Lieutenant Governor of Massachusetts; 1789–1794; Acting Governor, 1793–1794	Succeeded by Moses Gill
Preceded by John Hancock	Governor of Massachusetts; 1794 – June 2, 1797	Succeeded by Increase Sumner
