= Elisha Cooke =

American physician (1637–1715)

Elisha Cooke Sr.
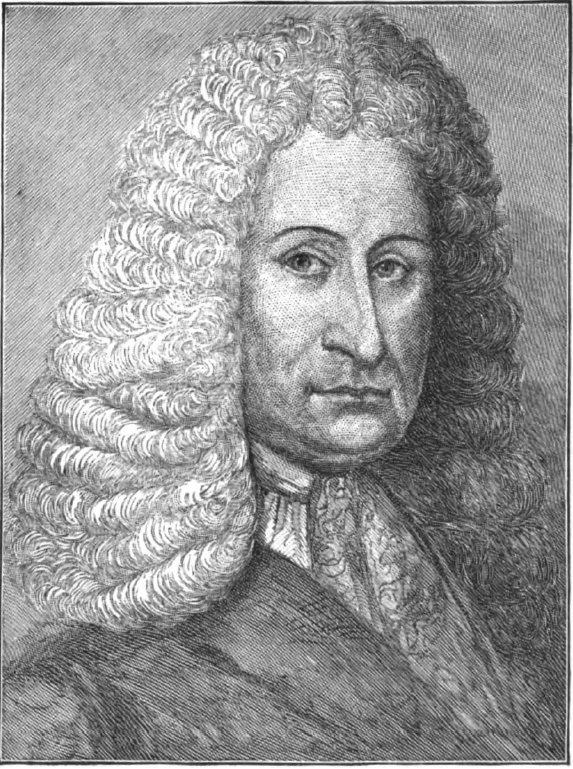

Associate Justice of the Massachusetts Superior Court of Judicature
- In office 1695–1702
- Preceded by: John Richards
- Succeeded by: John Leverett

Member of the Council of Assistants
- In office 1684–1686

Speaker of the General Court
- In office 1683–1683
- Preceded by: Daniel Fisher
- Succeeded by: John Waite

Member of the General Court for Boston
- In office 1681–1683

Personal details
- Born: September 16, 1637 Boston, Massachusetts Bay Colony
- Died: October 31, 1715 (aged 78)
- Spouse: Elizabeth Leverett
- Profession: Physician

Elisha Cooke (September 16, 1637 – October 31, 1715) was a wealthy Massachusetts physician, politician, and businessman who was elected Speaker of the Massachusetts Bay Assembly in 1683. He was the leader of the "popular party", a faction in the Massachusetts House that resisted encroachment by royal officials on colonial rights embodied in the Massachusetts Charter. This role was taken up by his son, Elisha Cooke Jr.

== Life ==
Coat of Arms of Elisha Cook

Cooke was born in Boston, the son of Richard and Elizabeth Cook, from Gloucestershire, England. He graduated from Harvard College in 1657 at age 20, in a class of seven students. Cooke was trained and practiced as a physician, but he also became a politician. He was made freeman in 1673. He was elected to the colonial assembly representing Boston in 1681, serving until 1683. Cooke was elected to the commission of counsellors in May 1693; however, Governor Sir William Phips refused to ratify the choice, to exact revenge on Cooke's having opposed his appointment as chief magistrate. In 1695 Cooke was appointed Judge of the Superior Court, taking the place of John Richards, who had died, and in 1701 he became Judge of Probate.

Cooke was a confidential adviser of Lord Bellomont, who became Governor of Massachusetts in 1699. He lost his judicial appointments in 1702 when Joseph Dudley became governor; Dudley took revenge on Cooke for being a member of the council which had committed him to prison in 1689. This had occurred after the 1689 Boston revolt, which deposed Sir Edmund Andros, governor of the Dominion of New England, and other officials (including Dudley). Cooke served on the rebel council that took power after the dominion's overthrow.

Cooke married Elizabeth Leverett, the daughter of Governor John Leverett in June 1668. They had one son, Elisha Jr., who was born on December 20, 1678. Elizabeth died on July 21, 1715, and Cooke died shortly thereafter on October 31, 1715.

Legal offices
Preceded by John Richards	Associate Justice of the Massachusetts Superior Court of Judicature; 1695–1702	Succeeded by John Leverett
