= Thomas Cushing (disambiguation) =

Thomas Cushing (1725–1788) was an American lawyer, merchant and statesman from Boston, Massachusetts.

Thomas Cushing may also refer to:

- Thomas Cushing II (1694–1746), American merchant, lawyer and politician in Massachusetts
- Thomas Forbes Cushing (1838–1902), American member of Boston, New York, and Newport society during the Gilded Age
- Thomas Humphrey Cushing (1755–1822), American army officer and collector of customs
- Tom Cushing (1879–1941), American playwright
