= William Fairfield (Massachusetts politician) =

Speaker of the Massachusetts House of Deputies
- In office 1741–1741
- Preceded by: John Quincy
- Succeeded by: Thomas Cushing II

Personal details
- Born: October 14, 1662 Reading, Massachusetts
- Died: December 18, 1742 (aged 80) Wenham, Massachusetts
- Resting place: Fairfield Family Burial Ground; Wenham, Massachusetts
- Spouse(s): Esther ----- (circa 1687–1722 or 1723; her death); Rebecca (Tarbox) Gott (1723–1742; his death)

William Fairfield (October 14, 1662 – December 18, 1742) was an American politician who served as Speaker of the Massachusetts House of Deputies in 1741.

== Early life ==
Fairfield was born to Ensign Walter and Sarah (Skipper) Fairfield on October 14, 1662, in Reading, Massachusetts.

== Politics ==
In 1701 he purchased a home in Wenham, Massachusetts. He became active in Wenham's town affairs. From 1706 to 1711 and 1724 to 1729 he served as Town Clerk. From 1715 to 1716, 1733 to 1736, and in 1739 and 1741 he was Town Moderator. He was a Representative at General Court in 1723, 1728, 1730, and from 1732 to 1742,

In 1741 he was named Speaker of the House of Deputies, which at that time the highest elected office in Massachusetts (the Governor and Lieutenant Governor were appointed by the King). Fairfield was described as "shrewd, clear-headed, practical" and as one who was "trained by reflection and experience, rather than by a knowledge of books". A frequently told anecdote about his tenure as speaker was that when he was heading to a session of the Legislature, he became so absorbed in thought that he reached Boston with his bridle in hand, before discovering that he had left his horse at home.

== Personal life and death ==
Fairfield was an active member of his church and served as a deacon for many years.

Fairfield was married twice. His first marriage was to Esther ----- circa 1687. They had thirteen children, all born in Wenham. She died on January 21, 1722, or 1723 in Wenham.

On October 14, 1723, Fairfield married Rebecca (Tarbox) Gott in Wenham.

Fairfield died on December 18, 1742, in Wenham.

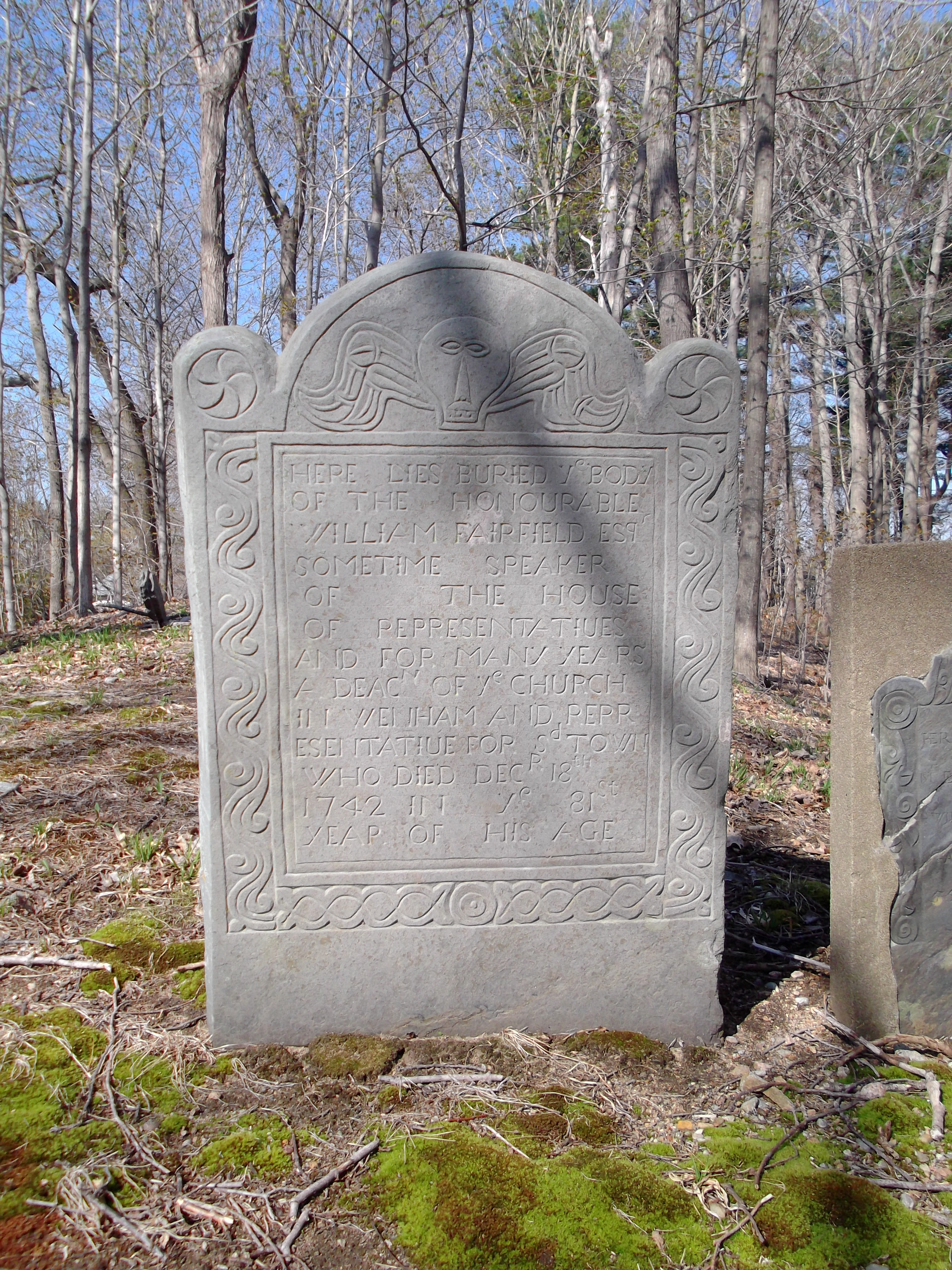
Headstone of William Fairfield (1662-1742)

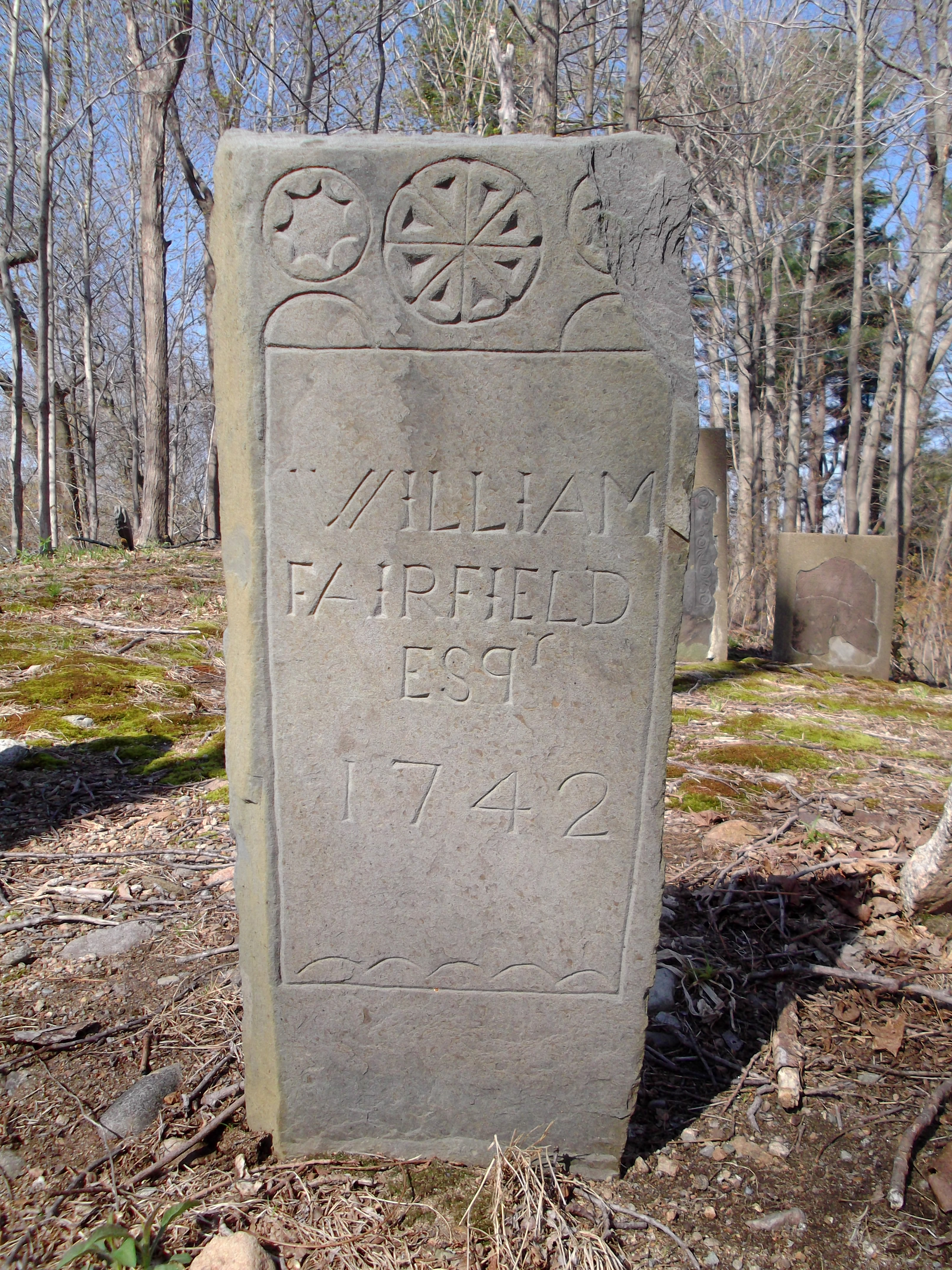
Footstone of William Fairfield (1662-1742)
