= Solomon Kimball House (Wenham, Massachusetts) =

Historic house in Massachusetts, United States

- U.S. National Register of Historic Places
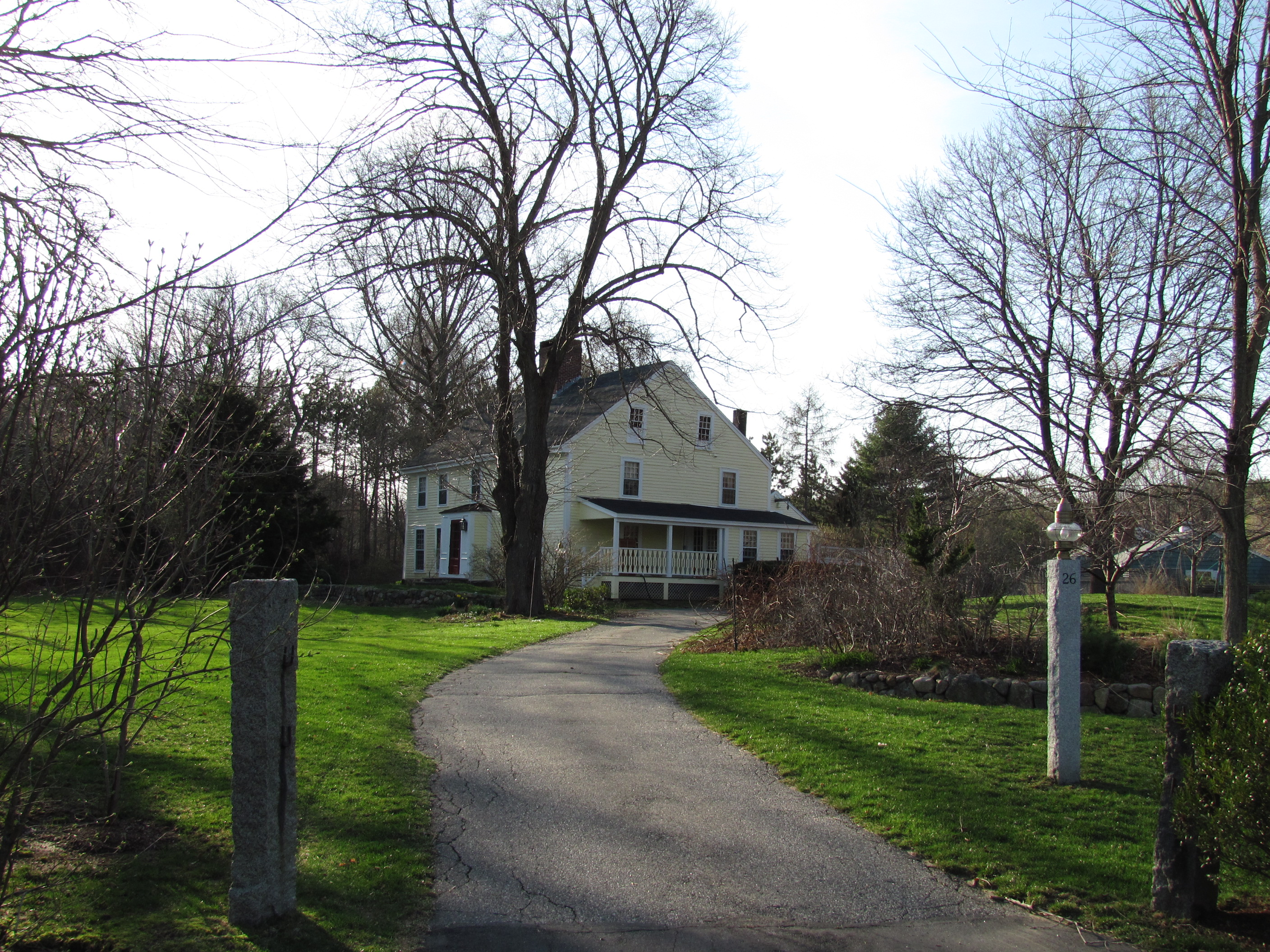
- Solomon Kimball House

- Location within Massachusetts Location within the United States
- Location: 26 Maple Street, Wenham, Massachusetts
- Coordinates: 42°36′3″N 70°55′13″W
- Built: 1696 c.1700 (NRHP)
- Architectural style: Colonial
- MPS: First Period Buildings of Eastern Massachusetts TR
- NRHP reference No.: 90000264
- Added to NRHP: March 9, 1990

The Solomon Kimball House, probably built in 1696, is a historic First Period house in Wenham, Massachusetts, United States. Although named for nineteenth- and early twentieth-century owner Solomon Kimball, the house was built by Thomas and Mary (Solart) Kilham—he the veteran of a pivotal battle in King Philip’s War and she the sister and aunt of defendants in the Salem Witchcraft Trials.

Eighteenth-century owners included Speaker of the Massachusetts House of Deputies William Fairfield, and American Revolutionary War veteran Capt. Matthew Fairfield.

The house was added to the National Register of Historic Places in 1990.

== History of ownership ==
- 1701: Thomas Kilham sold his dwelling house, barn, orchard and house lot of 25 acres (along with 1.5 acres of meadow land in Lord’s Meadow, Wenham) to William Fairfield. Further research is needed to determine when and from whom Thomas bought the parcel.
- 1725: William Fairfield gave the house and a house lot of 2 acres to his son Josiah Fairfield as a wedding gift
  - William reiterated this gift on two subsequent occasions. First, in 1738, William gave Josiah one-fourth of William’s 45 acres of “homesteads and lands in Wenham and elsewhere” (reserving 16 poles for a burying ground) and another one-fourth to William’s son Benjamin—Josiah’s share including “Thomas Killam[ʼ]s homestead,” and Benjamin’s share including William’s homestead. Second, in his 1742 will, William refers to his deeds of gift to sons Josiah and Benjamin, and gives them the remainder of his real estate, representing 180 acres of “sundry parcels” in Wenham and Ipswich.
  - Over the years Josiah added to the acreage of his house lot, expanding it to 46 acres by 1767. He appears to have had some financial difficulty around this time, however, because in January 1767 he sold various assets (his dwelling house, barn, “out houses,” house lot of 46 acres, additional parcels of upland and meadow, lots in Wenham Great Swamp, and his pew in the Wenham Meeting House) to his brother Benjamin for £600—and seven months later purchased the same assets (less a lot of upland and the pew in the meeting house) back from Benjamin for £550, and at the same time sold Benjamin 40 acres on the south side of current-day Maple Street (with barn) for 10 shillings.
- 1771: Josiah Fairfield gave “the back part of my dwelling house [i.e., the lean-to] with the cellar under it and the entry that is between that back house & my dwelling house,” along with one-half of his cider house and cider mill, to his son Capt. Matthew Fairfield
- 1777: Josiah Fairfield died and bequeathed all his real estate to his sons Matthew and Josiah Jr., in reversion, after the death of his wife Elizabeth (Appleton) Fairfield. An inventory of Josiah’s real estate lists a “mansion house,” half a barn, half a cider house, a quarter of a cider mill and about 45 acres of land, the total value of which was £600.
- 1783: Josiah’s widow Elizabeth (Appleton) Fairfield sued Matthew and Josiah Fairfield Jr. to secure her possession of her late husband’s real estate, resulting with a six-acre house lot
- 1797: Matthew Fairfield sold the property (i.e., a “mansion house” and six acres, including a “small piece of land” called “the nursery”) to Thomas Kimball and Joseph Fairfield for $333.33
- 1810: Thomas Kimball died, the inventory of his estate including a house, “old” and “new” barns, a cow barn and “old shop.” Thomas' widow Huldah (Porter) Kimball died in 1835. Their son Thomas Kimball Jr. eventually bought out his siblings’ interests in the real estate.
- 1845: Thomas Kimball Jr. died, and son Solomon E. Kimball inherited his house
- 1924: Solomon E. Kimball died intestate, and son Elwell F. Kimball inherited Solomon’s “[f]arm in Wenham including land and buildings” valued at $5,500.00

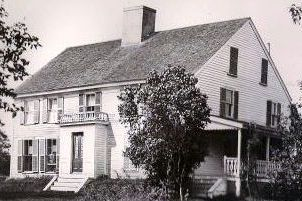
Solomon Kimball House, 1900

== Thomas and Mary (Solart) Kilham ==
Thomas Kilham (or Killam), son of Daniel and Mary (Safford) Kilham, was born in 1653 or 1654 in Wenham, and married Martha Solart c. 1680. Kilham was a veteran of King Philip’s War, serving under Major Samuel Appleton of Ipswich in Appleton’s campaign against the Narragansett, including the Great Swamp Fight of December 19, 1675.

Thomas Kilham sold his house in Wenham to William Fairfield in July 1701 and moved to Boxford (MA). He died there in 1725 and his burial was likely the genesis of the Killam-Curtis Cemetery. Martha died after Thomas did, but no record of her death has survived.

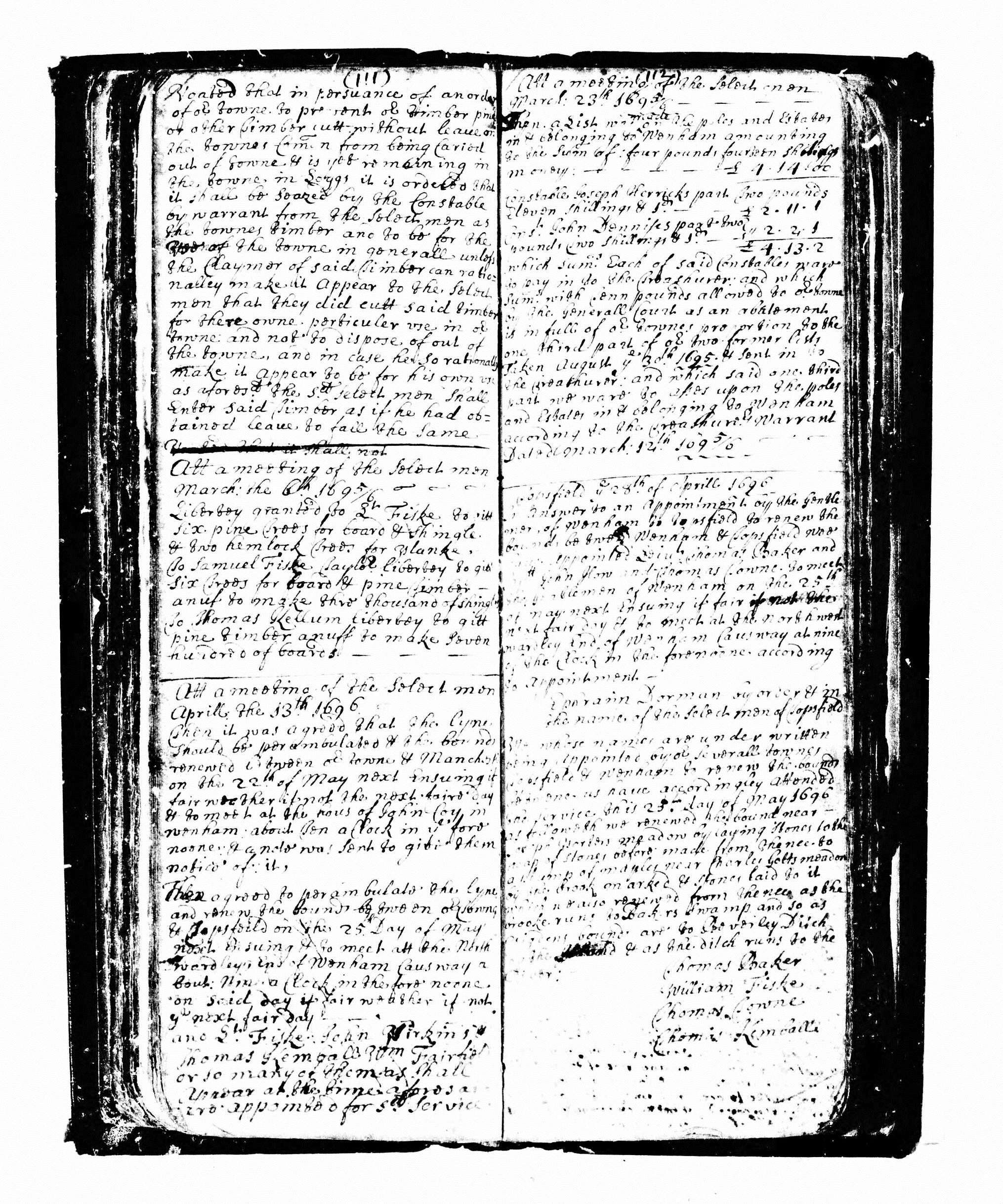
Wenham Town Clerk's record of the 1696 timber grant to Kilham, providing lumber apparently for the construction of his house

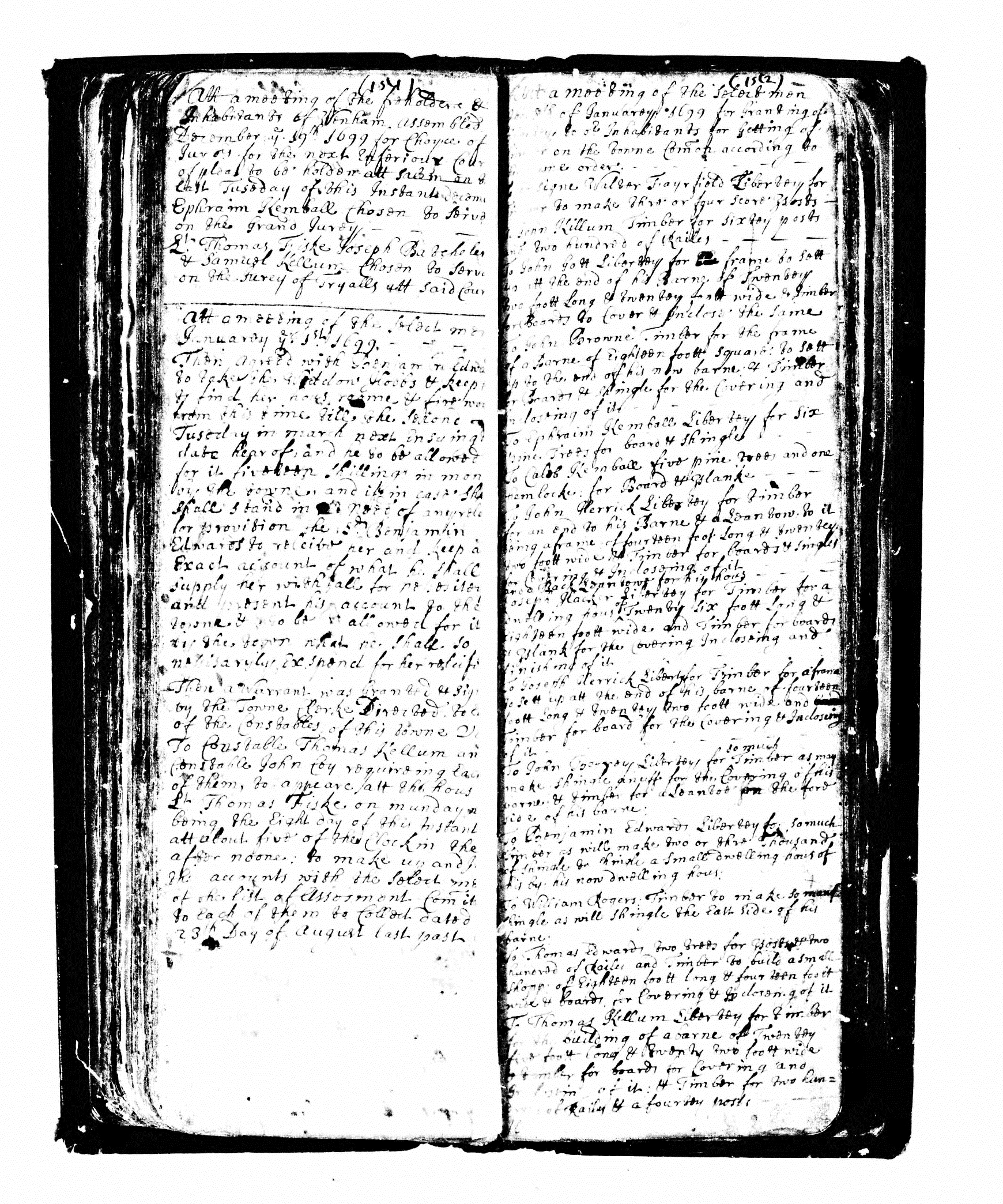
Wenham Town Clerk's record of the 1700 timber grant to Kilham, providing lumber for the construction of his barn

== William, Esther (-----) and Rebecca (Tarbox) Fairfield ==
William Fairfield owned the property from 1701 to 1725. He lived in a house near the current-day intersection of Cherry Street and William Fairfield Drive, a house that he probably built around 1687 coincident with his first marriage. (The land adjacent to Fairfield's house included a burial ground that the family started in 1691.) The Fairfield Farm was contiguous to the Thomas Kilham Farm, and Fairfield apparently bought the Kilham property as an investment. He gave the former Thomas Kilham homestead to his son Josiah Fairfield as a wedding gift in 1725.

He appears to have been one of those shrewd, clear-headed, practical men, whose minds are formed and trained by reflection and experience, rather than by a knowledge of books, or by intercourse with the world. He held, at different times, every office in the gift of the people of his native town and State, and in all, he gained the confidence of those whom he was called to serve. He was also an active member of the church, and for many years one of its deacons. We regret that so little can now be ascertained concerning Mr. Fairfield. An anecdote is still told of him, which is quite characteristic. The common mode of travelling in those days was on horseback. Setting out to attend a session of the Legislature, he became so absorbed in thinking of the business on which they were to enter, and upon his duties as Speaker, that he is said to have actually reached Boston, bridle in hand, before discovering that he had left his horse at home.

== Capt. Matthew and Abigail (Ayer) Fairfield ==
Matthew Fairfield, son of Josiah and his second wife Elizabeth (Appleton) Fairfield, was born May 18, 1745, in Wenham (likely in the Solomon Kimball House), married Abigail Ayer on October 22, 1767, in Haverhill (MA), and died on February 11, 1813, in New Boston, NH. Matthew was the first of Josiah’s sons to reach adulthood, and it’s likely that when he married Abigail they took up residence in Josiah and Elizabeth’s house. This was certainly the case by 1771, when Matthew and Abigail were living in the lean-to of the house, Josiah and Elizabeth were living in the other part of the house, and Josiah gave Matthew the lean-to and part of the cellar (along with one half of a cider house and cider mill nearby).

== Maps ==
- 1795: Surveyed by Richard Dodge, this is the oldest map known of Wenham, and shows the town’s boundaries, roads and major bodies of water. Current-day Maple Street appears, as does that portion of current-day Topsfield Road northwest of Maple Street. (Note that current-day Topsfield Road did not extend to the Beverly town line, but stopped at current-day Maple and Cherry Streets.)
- 1831: Surveyed by Philander Anderson, this map shows the expansion of Wenham’s system of roads, the addition of swampland, and a drawing of the Wenham Meeting House.

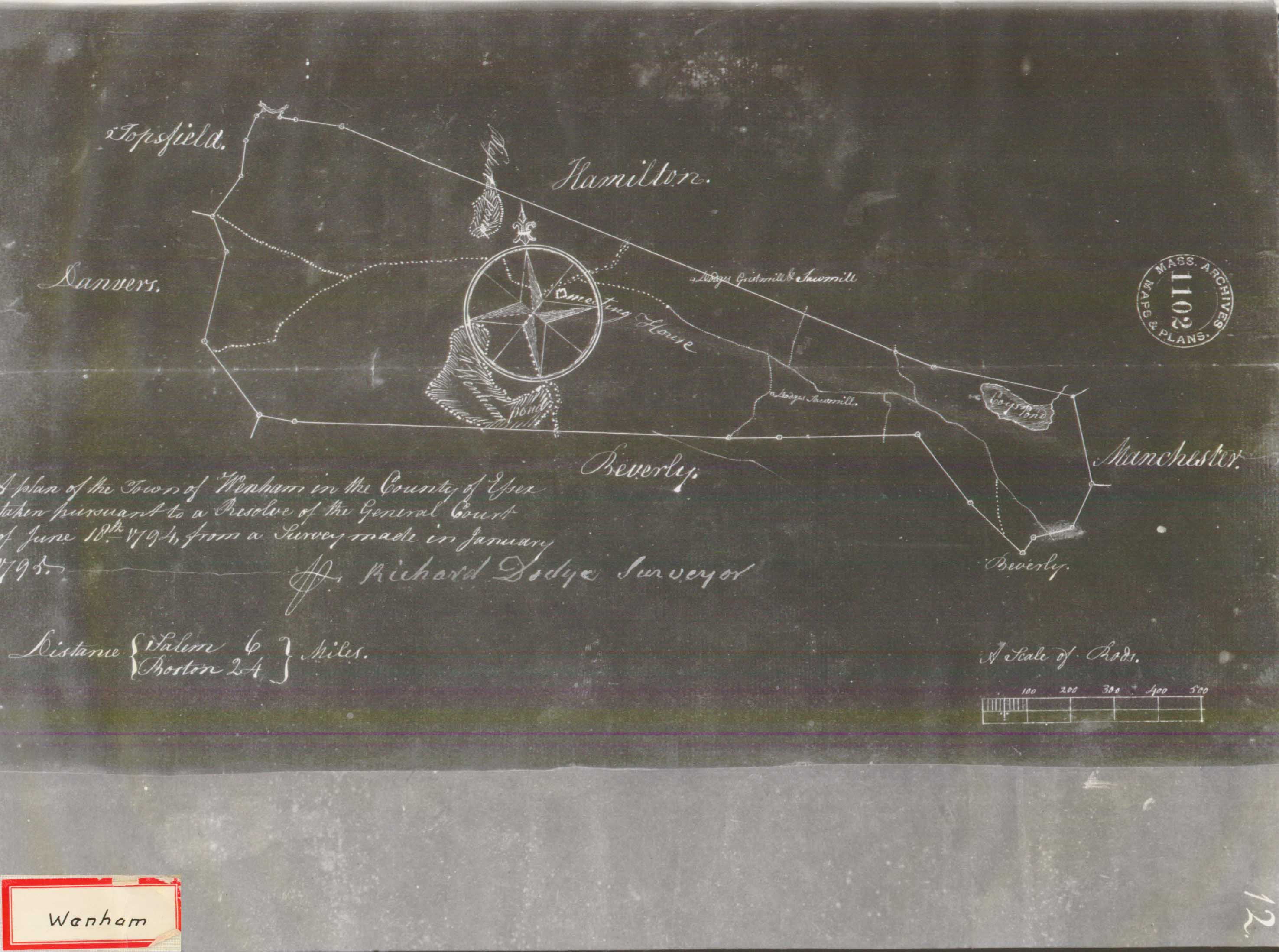
Wenham, 1795

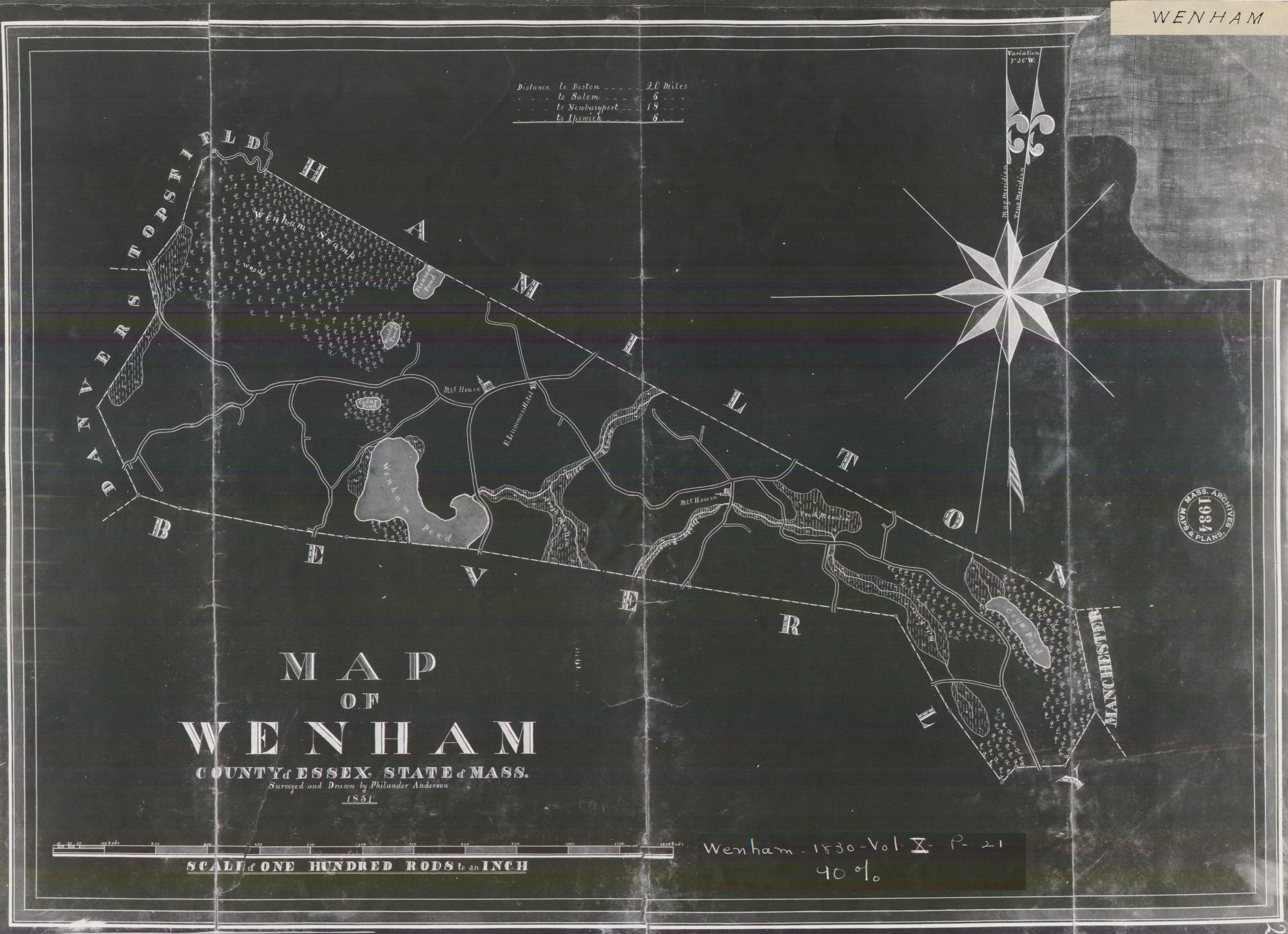
Wenham, 1831

- 1872: This map shows the Solomon Kimball House as “T. Kimball Est[ate].” The “A. Bagley” house, near the northeast corner of the intersection of current-day Cherry Street and Topsfield Road, was the William Fairfield homestead.
- 1884: This map shows the Solomon Kimball House as “S. Kimball.”

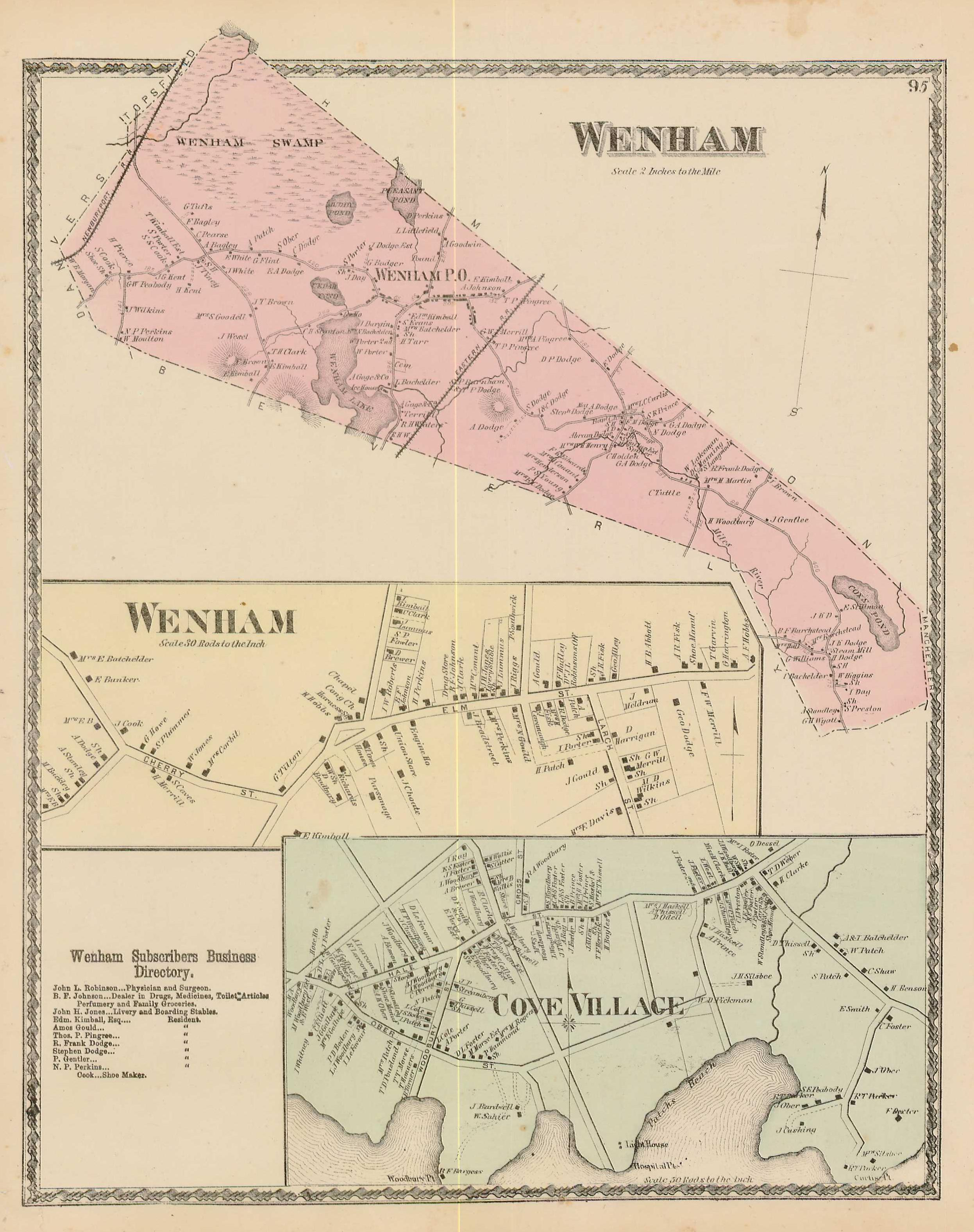
Wenham, 1872

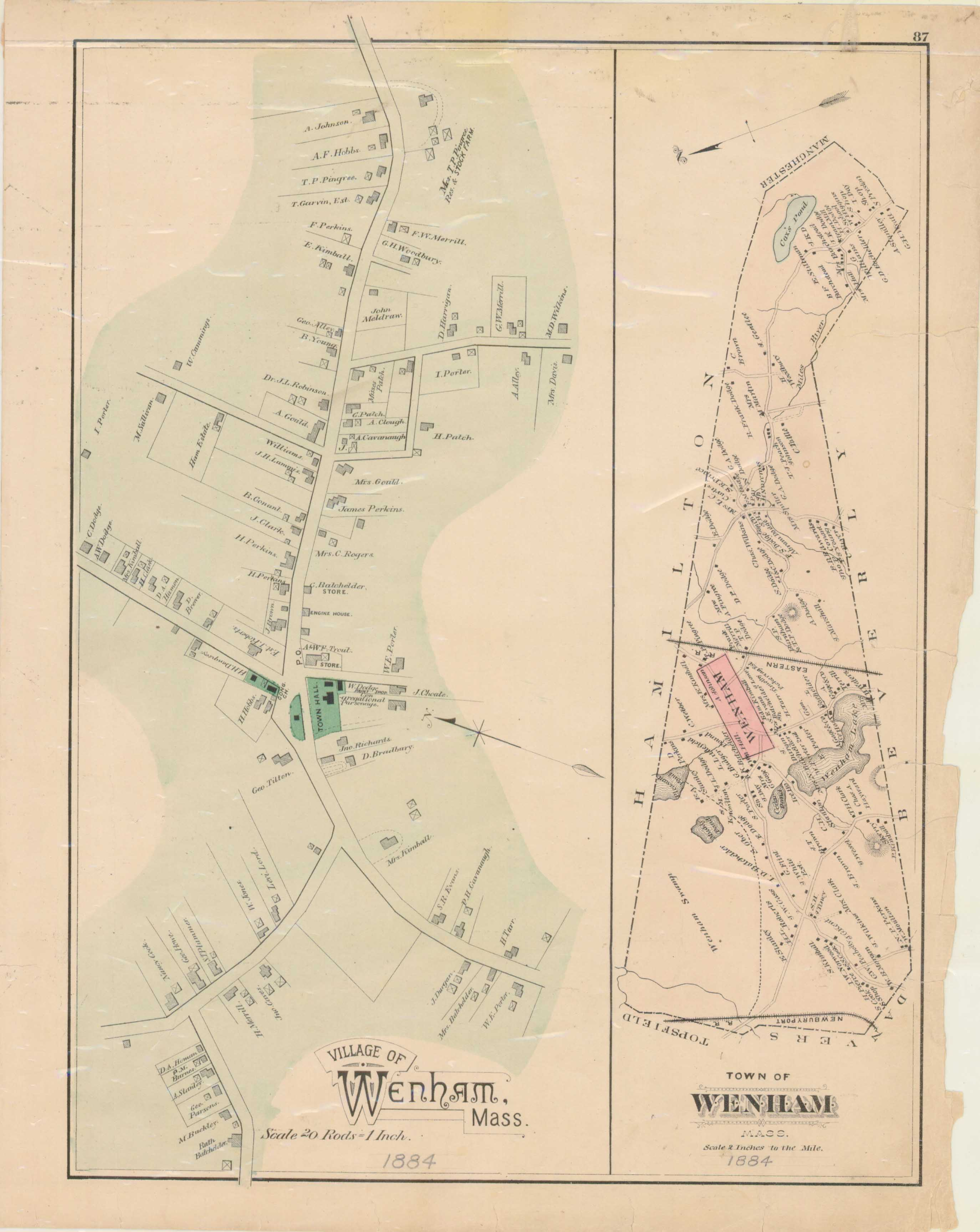
Wenham, 1884

- 1910 (Western & Central Wenham): This map shows the Solomon Kimball House as “S Kimball” and provides the location of the house itself as well as three out buildings. The outline of the house indicates an ell or porch at the northeast corner of the building that no longer exists.
- 1910 (Maple & Bomer Streets): This on-the-ground survey of properties adjacent to Maple and Bomer Streets (Bomer Street subsequently known as the portion of Topsfield Road southwest of Maple and Cherry Streets) shows the location of an orchard and garden belonging to Solomon Kimball, northwest of the Moulton lot (which was opposite Company Lane). The 1910 map of western and central Wenham, however—which likely was not drawn from an on-the-ground survey—identifies the lot northwest of the Moulton lot as “Hrs. E. Kimball” (or heirs of E. Kimball). This label is probably a typo; the lot northwest of the Moulton lot would have been owned by heirs of Thomas Kimball or by Solomon Kimball himself.

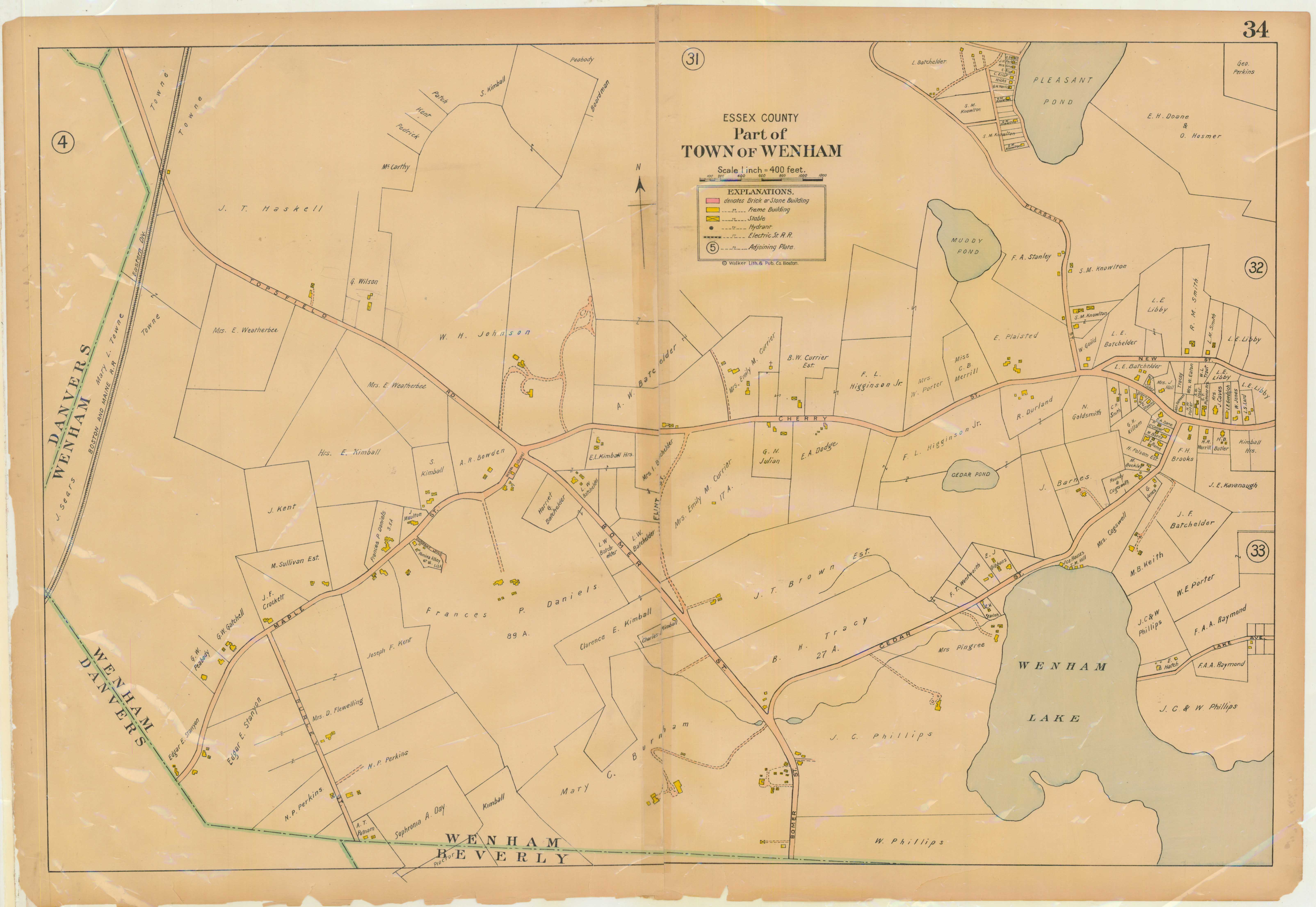
Western & Central Wenham, 1910

Maple & Bomer Streets, Wenham, 1910

- 1955: The subdivision of the Solomon Kimball farm began in 1955 and continued through the mid-1960s, creating Puritan Road, Mayflower Drive and the lots facing those streets. This 1955 map, drawn at the beginning of the subdivision program, shows the location and outline of the Solomon Kimball House and two outbuildings; note the outline of an ell or porch on the north side of the house that no longer exists.

Solomon Kimball House Site, 1955

== See also ==
- List of the oldest buildings in Massachusetts
- National Register of Historic Places listings in Essex County, Massachusetts
