= Thomas Cushing =

First Massachusetts Lieutenant Governor, briefly acting governor (1725–1788)

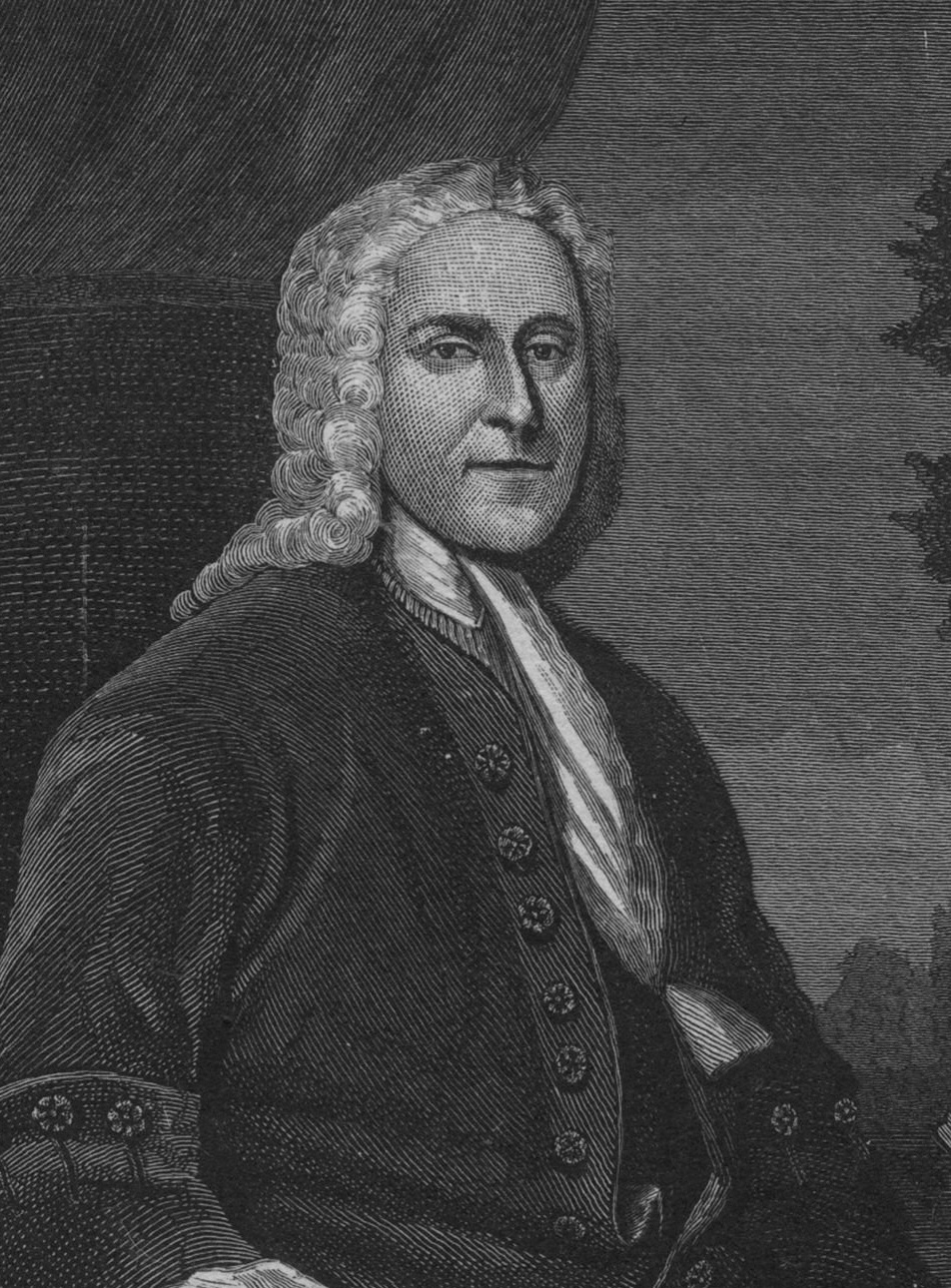
- Portrait, c. 1774

Acting Governor of Massachusetts
- In office February 17, 1785 – May 27, 1785
- Lieutenant: Himself
- Preceded by: John Hancock
- Succeeded by: James Bowdoin

1st Lieutenant Governor of Massachusetts
- In office November 4, 1780 – February 28, 1788
- Governor: John Hancock (1780–1785); Himself (1785); James Bowdoin (1785–1788)
- Preceded by: Thomas Oliver (as Lieutenant Governor of the Province of Massachusetts Bay)
- Succeeded by: Benjamin Lincoln

Speaker of the General Court
- In office May 28, 1766 – October 1774
- Preceded by: James Otis Jr.
- Succeeded by: John Hancock (as Congress President)

President of the Massachusetts Senate
- In office October 25, 1780 – November 4, 1780
- Preceded by: office established
- Succeeded by: Jeremiah Powell

Member of the Massachusetts Senate
- In office October 25, 1780 – November 4, 1780

Member of the General Court for Boston
- In office 1731–1747
- In office 1761–1774

Member of the Boston Board of Selectmen
- In office 1753–1763

Personal details
- Born: March 24, 1725 Boston, Province of Massachusetts Bay
- Died: February 28, 1788 (aged 62) Boston, Massachusetts
- Spouse: Deborah Fletcher (m. 1747; died 1788)
- Education: Boston Latin School
- Alma mater: Harvard College
- Occupation: Merchant, Lawyer

Thomas Cushing III (March 24, 1725 – February 28, 1788) was an American lawyer, merchant, and statesman from Boston, Massachusetts. Active in Boston politics, he represented the city in the provincial assembly from 1761 to its dissolution in 1774, serving as the lower house's speaker for most of those years. Because of his role as speaker, his signature was affixed to many documents protesting British policies, leading officials in London to consider him a dangerous radical. He engaged in extended communications with Benjamin Franklin who at times lobbied on behalf of the legislature's interests in London, seeking ways to reduce the rising tensions of the American Revolution.

Cushing represented Massachusetts in the First (during which he signed the Continental Association) and Second Continental Congresses but was voted out when he opposed independence. Despite this, he remained politically active after independence, continuing to serve in the state government. During the Revolutionary War, he was a commissary responsible for provisioning the military, a position he used to enrich the family merchant business. He was elected the state's first lieutenant governor in 1780. Politically associated with fellow merchant Governor John Hancock, he remained lieutenant governor until his death in 1788, briefly serving as acting governor in 1785 between the resignation of Hancock and the election of James Bowdoin.

== Early years ==
Coat of Arms of Thomas Cushing

Thomas was born in Boston, the capital of the British Province of Massachusetts Bay, on March 24, 1725, the second of at least seven children. The Cushing family, with deep roots in the province, descends from Deacon Matthew Cushing who emigrated from Norfolk, England, to Hingham in 1638. Thomas' father, also named Thomas (1694–1746), was one of the city's wealthiest merchants, a leading member of the Old South Church, and a city selectman. Thomas Sr. was a frequent moderator of town meetings and accepted on behalf of the city of Boston the gift of Faneuil Hall (a large market building and public meeting space) from Peter Faneuil in 1742. He served in the General Court (colonial assembly) of Massachusetts from 1731 to 1747, and as its speaker after 1742. His mother, Mary (Bromfield) Cushing (1689–1746), was also from a prominent Boston family.

Thomas got his early education at the Boston Latin School and then attended Harvard where he graduated in 1744. He studied law and was admitted to the bar, after which he entered the family merchant business. On October 1, 1747, he married Deborah Fletcher (c. 1727–1790), with whom he had five children.

== Political career ==
In 1753, Cushing entered politics, winning election as a Boston selectman. He continued in that office until 1763 and was also elected to the general court in 1761. He became politically associated with Samuel Adams and John Hancock, in part through his attendance at political discussions in Boston's taverns. With Hancock in particular he eventually formed a lifelong relationship in which the charismatic Hancock was seen to be the dominant political personality. He contributed financially to some of Hancock's political spending, although he preferred to stand in the background and let Hancock receive the credit. Because of this, his (and Hancock's) political opponents in later years often characterized him as little more than Hancock's henchman or proxy.

When the French and Indian War came to an end in 1763, the British government sought to recover the costs of posting troops in the colonies by imposing taxes on the colonies. Cushing was an early opponent of these taxes, couching his opposition in economic terms, a reflection on his livelihood as a merchant. An astute observer of the trade ties binding the various parts of the British Empire, he wrote in 1763 that extant high duties on molasses (payment of which was widely flouted by New England merchants) would have significantly harmed the economies of Britain, North America, and the West Indies, in part by diverting significant quantities of scarce hard currency to those duties. John Adams wrote of Cushing that "[He] is steady and constant and busy in the interest of liberty and the opposition, and is famed for secrecy and his talent for procuring intelligence."

=== Speaker of the house ===
In May 1766 Cushing was chosen to be speaker of the assembly. The assembly first chose James Otis, but Governor Bernard rejected this choice, and Cushing was named as a compromise candidate. During his tenure as speaker he was a frequent correspondent with the assembly's agent in London, Benjamin Franklin, who was given the job in late 1770. In addition to official correspondence such as petitions, the two men exchanged opinions on political developments in their respective areas and were broadly in agreement on the need for moderation in dealing with the British government. In 1772, Franklin acquired letters written by several royal appointees, including Governor Thomas Hutchinson when he was still lieutenant governor. Seeking to deflect colonial blame for matters away from the British government and onto the royal governor, Franklin forwarded these letters to Cushing, with specific instructions that they only be shown to a few people. Those who saw them included the radical Samuel Adams, who engineered their eventual publication in 1773. In the letters, Hutchinson and Lieutenant Governor Andrew Oliver made highly inflammatory suggestions that colonial rights needed to be abridged. The resulting scandal inflamed political tensions on both sides of the Atlantic, prompted a petition from the assembly that Hutchinson be recalled, and brought about Franklin's resignation as colonial agent and conversion to a pro-independence view after he was publicly lambasted for his role in the affair.

Cushing held the post of speaker until the assembly was dissolved in October 1774 by Governor and British Army General Thomas Gage, who succeeded Hutchinson. The assembly's members then met without the governor's permission and formed the Massachusetts Provincial Congress. This body would constitute the de facto government of Massachusetts until its state constitution was adopted in 1780.

Despite his opposition to British policies, Cushing did not at first strongly support the revolution. In 1772, he (along with Hancock, who was also then moderate in his views) refused to serve when named to one of the Boston Committees of correspondence. Despite his lack of revolutionary ardor, he was elected as a delegate to the First Continental Congress in 1774 and to the second in 1775. He became associated with the radical cause by London political figures in part because, as Massachusetts speaker, his signature was affixed to all of its petitions. As a result, orders issued to General Gage in April 1775 for the arrest of radical leaders included Cushing's name. Gage did not pursue such orders for the arrest of leaders, and Cushing was never detained.

=== American Revolution ===
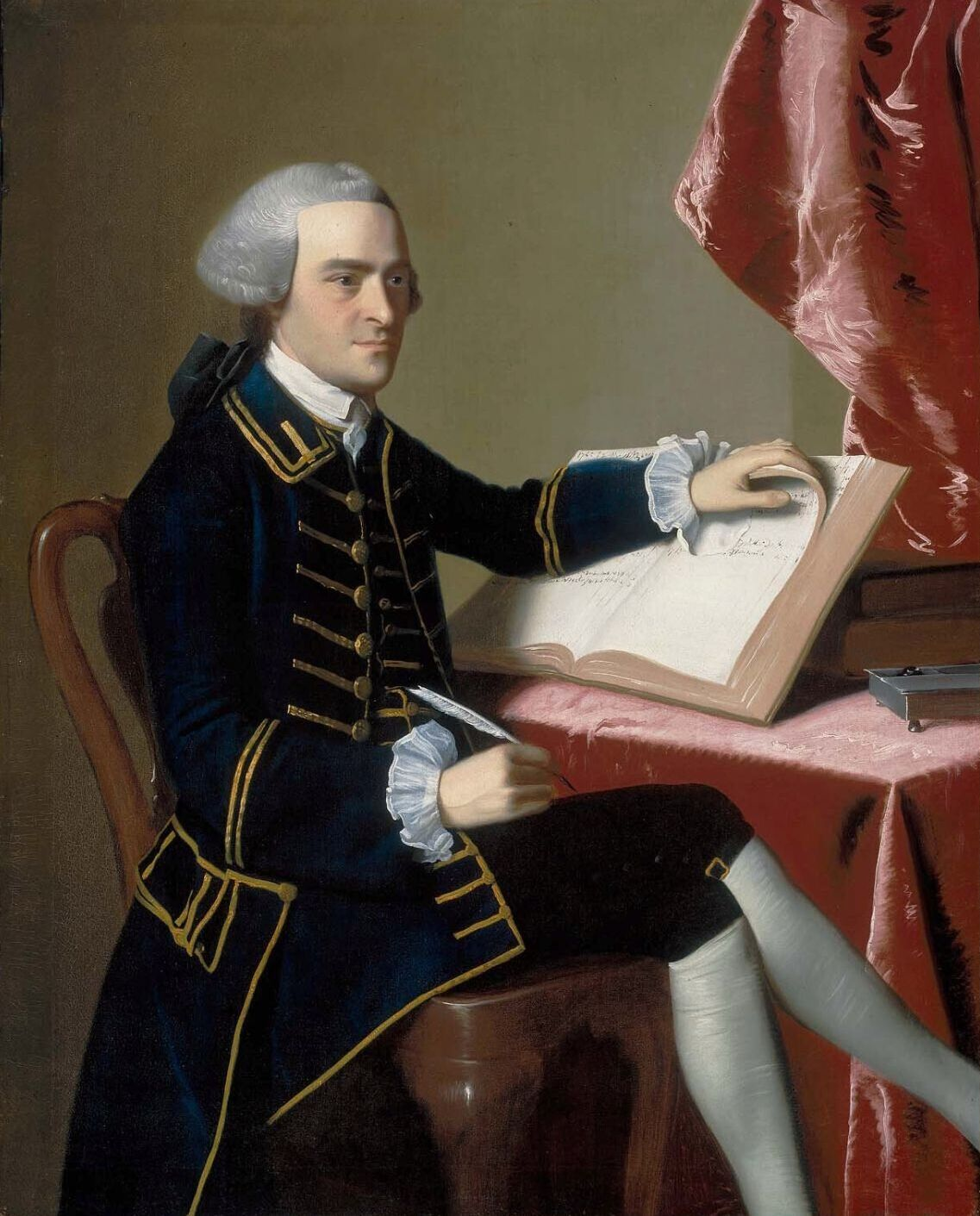
John Hancock, portrait by John Singleton Copley

Cushing continued to maintain a weak attitude toward independence through 1775, which cost him his seat in the Continental Congress in December 1775. After a heated election campaign, Cushing was defeated by Elbridge Gerry, who was committed to independence. The loss, which decisively handed pro-independence forces a majority in the Massachusetts delegation, propelled Cushing firmly into Hancock's camp. Cushing continued to oppose independence upon his return to Massachusetts, orchestrating delays in the polling process by which the state formally called for a declaration of independence.

Hancock, the president of the Continental Congress, rewarded Cushing's loyalty by securing for him the appointment as a commissioner of marine affairs. In this role Cushing oversaw the procurement of two 32-gun frigates for the Continental Navy. He was also appointed the chief commissary responsible for supplying Massachusetts troops, a post he held for several years. In 1780, he was appointed as one of the chief commissaries responsible for supplying the French troops at Newport, Rhode Island. Cushing, in behavior that was similar to that of other merchants involved in military supply, used these positions to substantially enrich the family merchant business by granting it favorably priced supply contracts. He was also involved in regional conventions that attempted to stem the inflationary decline in value of the Continental dollar by setting wage and price controls; these attempts failed because states refused to implement convention recommendations.

In 1778 Cushing was involved in an unsuccessful attempt to create a new constitution for the state. This effort was rejected by the state's eligible voters for a variety of reason, although there continued to be calls from the towns demanding a new constitution. Cushing was not involved in the detailed drafting of the state constitution that was adopted in 1780. He was a charter member of the American Academy of Arts and Sciences (1780).

=== President of the Massachusetts Senate ===
Cushing was elected to the Massachusetts Senate the 1780 election. As several districts failed to elect senators and several others refused to serve, there were only nineteen senators sworn in for the first Senate session of 1780. On October 25, 1780, of the nineteen senators who had been sworn in, fourteen voted for Cushing, and Cushing was elected the first President of the Massachusetts Senate. Cushing resigned as president on November 4, 1780, in order to become the Lieutenant Governor of Massachusetts.

=== Lieutenant governor ===
Cushing stood for election as lieutenant governor in the 1780 election. The vote was indecisive as no candidate received a majority of the votes cast, and the choice was given to the General Court to decide. Its first candidate, James Bowdoin, refused the post, as did the second choice, James Warren, and the choice went to Cushing on the third ballot. He then served in the post, most of the time serving under his friend John Hancock, until his death in 1788. In early 1785, Hancock offered his resignation to the legislature, partly as a political maneuver (although he claimed to be suffering a particularly bad case of gout at the time). The legislature did not insist that Hancock remain in office, resulting in Hancock actually resigning. Cushing became acting governor and served out the last few months of the term.

The 1785 election for governor was highly political and divisive; Cushing was portrayed by his opponents (principally Bowdoin and his supporters) as little more than a creature of Hancock who would do Hancock's bidding. The election was again undecided by the electorate; Bowdoin prevailed in the General Court's decision-making, and Cushing again won the lieutenant governor's office. Bowdoin served two terms, which were dominated by Shays' Rebellion, an uprising caused in part by Bowdoin's harsh fiscal policies and poor economic conditions in the rural parts of the state. In 1787, Hancock returned to politics, trouncing Bowdoin. In each of these elections Cushing was re-elected as lieutenant governor.

During their time in office Hancock and Cushing funded the rebuilding of Boston, which had suffered heavy damage during the first two years of the Revolutionary War. Although Hancock was given most of the credit for this effort, Cushing also played a significant role in the rebuilding effort.

== Death and legacy ==
Thomas Cushing died in Boston on February 28, 1788, while serving as lieutenant governor. He was buried in Boston's Granary Burying Ground. Cushing, Maine, is named in his honor.

== See also ==
- Jacob Duché — Asked by Cushing to commence the first meeting of the First Continental Congress in prayer.

== Citations ==
Political offices
New office	Lieutenant Governor of Massachusetts; 1780–1788	Succeeded by Benjamin Lincoln
Preceded by John Hancock as Governor	Acting Governor of Massachusetts; 1785	Succeeded by James Bowdoin as Governor
