= Thomas Cushing II =

American lawyer

Thomas Cushing II (1694 – April 1746) was an American merchant, lawyer and politician who served as Speaker of the Massachusetts House of Representatives from 1742 to 1745.

One of his seven children was his son Thomas Cushing, future lieutenant governor of Massachusetts. He graduated from Harvard College on 1711.

== Archives and records ==
- Thomas Cushing waste book at Baker Library Special Collections, Harvard Business School.
