= Samuel Quincy =

American lawyer (1734-1789)

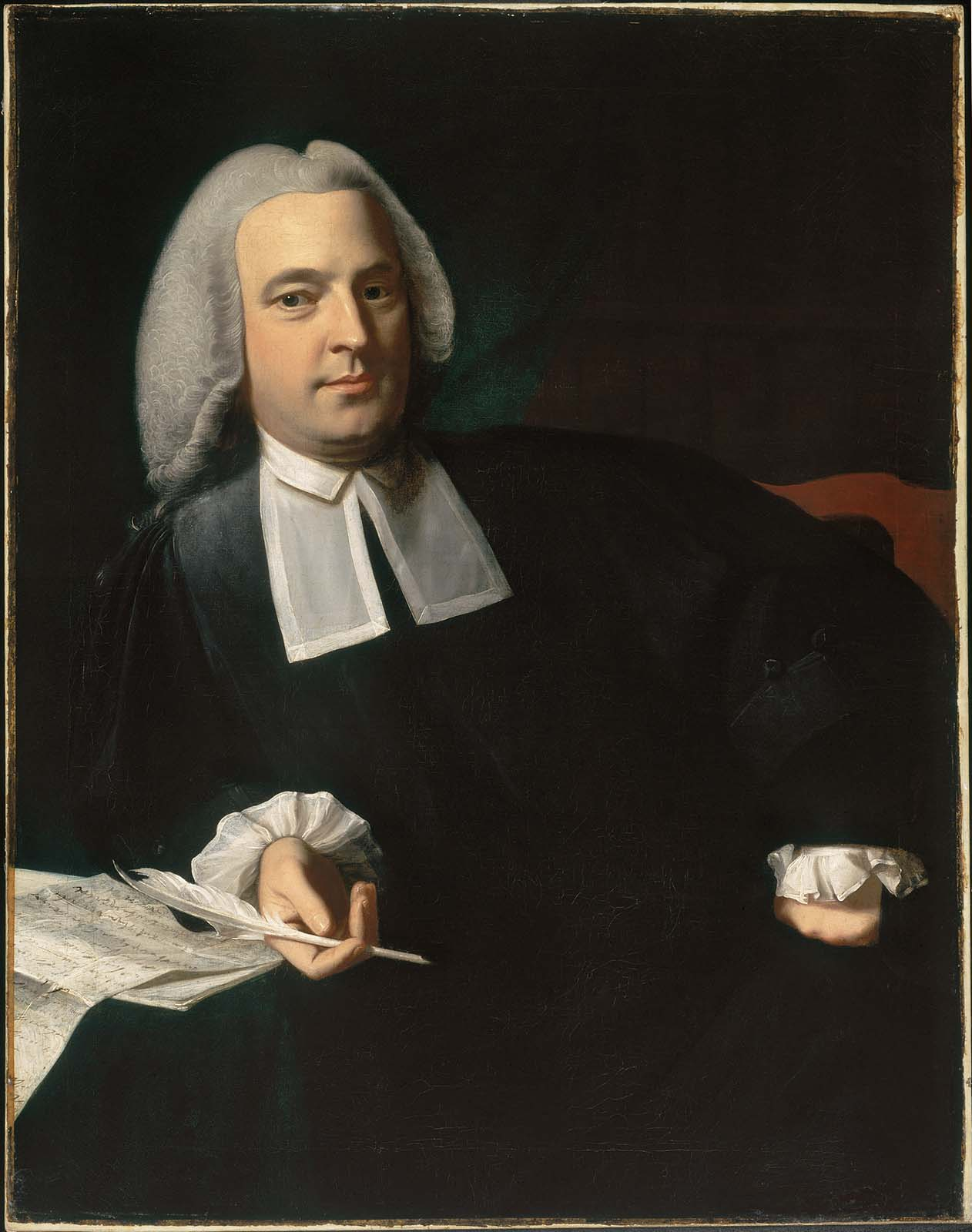
- Portrait c. 1767

Solicitor General of Massachusetts
- In office 1771 – May 1775

Personal details
- Born: April 13, 1734 Braintree, Province of Massachusetts Bay, British North America
- Died: August 9, 1789 (aged 55) At sea
- Spouse: Hannah Hill (m. 1761; died 1782) M. A. Chadwell (m. 1787)
- Children: 3
- Parent: Josiah Quincy I (father)
- Relatives: Josiah Quincy II (brother); Josiah Quincy (grandson)
- Education: Harvard College
- Occupation: Lawyer

Samuel Quincy (April 13, 1734 – August 9, 1789) was an American lawyer. Born to the Quincy political family, he worked as a lawyer in Boston, with his work including as prosecutor for the 1770 murder of Christopher Seider and subsequent Boston Massacre. However, he was aligned with the British side, becoming the Solicitor General of Massachusetts, and fled the country after the Battles of Lexington and Concord, reestablishing his law career in Antigua.

== Early life and career ==
Samuel Quincy was born on April 13, 1734, in Braintree, Massachusetts, in an area later broken off into Quincy. Born to the Quincy political family, he was a son of Hannah (née Sturgis) and merchant and magistrate Josiah Quincy I, while his brother was patriot Josiah Quincy II.

Quincy attended Harvard College, where he had a reputation as an "easy, social and benevolent Companion, not without Genius, Elegance and Taste", and eventually graduated in 1754 as valedictorian. Following his graduation, he studied law under future New York chief justice Benjamin Prat in 1755. He was admitted to the bar at the Suffolk County Inferior Court of Common Pleas in 1758 and the Massachusetts Superior Court of Judicature in 1761, and was part of Massachusetts' first class of barristers in 1762.

== Law career ==
Quincy worked as a lawyer based in Boston, though he travelled throughout Massachusetts as part of his Superior Court duties. He was also involved in community life, providing philanthropic support for his alma mater, and being part of the Grand Lodge of Massachusetts and West Church. In the 1760s, John Singleton Copley painted portraits of both him (c. 1767) and his wife (c. 1761); both portraits later became part of the collection of the Boston Museum of Fine Arts. He was also a close friend of Founding Fathers John Adams and John Hancock, once dined with the Sons of Liberty, and would reportedly be "preoccupied more by social manners than by professional ambitions".

Alongside Robert Treat Paine, he became a prosecutor for the 1770 murder of Christopher Seider and subsequent Boston Massacre; L. Kinvin Wroth argues that several surviving documents "show that Quincy demonstrated solid professional skill in his argument and presentation of the evidence, though he did not match the passion and intensity displayed by his opponents". His position in the trials placed him against his brother Josiah, who defended the British soldiers charged with the murders.

== Relationship with the loyalist side and exile ==
Despite his own initial support for the Revolution and opposition for certain aspects of colonial rule, Quincy also displayed aspects of loyalty to the British side, including signing a massive farewell to Governor Thomas Hutchinson. This put him in contrast to the staunch patriot support within his family. In March 1771, he was appointed to the position of Solicitor General of Massachusetts, as well as justice of the peace for Suffolk County; the tea tax funded his salary for both positions. He fled to England on a ship full of loyalists following the Battles of Lexington and Concord, with his wife and children remaining in the United States, and he was named by the Massachusetts Banishment Act in 1778. His house was damaged by a Revolutionary mob, and his sister Hannah was worried that he would die at sea as two of their brothers previously did.

Exiled from the now-independent United States, Quincy settled in England before moving to Antigua in 1780. In his new home in the West Indies, he became a successful lawyer and the island's comptroller of the customs, with his wife and two of his younger children reuniting with him. He later moved to Saint Kitts as a widower and, in 1785, to Saint Croix.

Nevertheless, Quincy was politically neutral and still remembered fondly by John Adams, who once wrote in a 1776 letter that "it is no moral Evil to pity [Quincy] and his Lady" and, in his 1804 autobiography, called him "easy, social and benevolent Companion, not without Genius, Elegance and Taste". Quincy missed many aspects about his old life in New England, including their salt cod dish. Wroth lamented that Quincy's differing loyalties resulted in the relative obscurity of Quincy's role in the trials.

== Personal life and legacy ==
Quincy married Hannah Hill, daughter of Boston distiller Thomas Hill, on June 16, 1761; they had three children:

- Samuel Quincy (1764-1816), who married Elizabeth Hatch (1764-1841); one of their children was New Hampshire politician Josiah Quincy
- Thomas Quincy (1767-c. 1840)
- Hannah Quincy (1763-1839), who had eight children with her husband naval surgeon Aaron Hill (1758-1830); one of them, Hannah, married jurist Willard Phillips.

Originally living on South Street in Boston, they moved to a larger house on Hanover Street in 1771.

During his exile, he remarried to the widowed M. A. Chadwell in 1787; he had no children from that marriage. On August 9, 1789, he died at sea while en route to England with his wife. His memoirs in London were printed in a 1882 volume of the Proceedings of the Massachusetts Historical Society. His diary and family letters are preserved in the Quincy Family Papers at the Massachusetts Historical Society, which also holds many of his other papers in other collections.
