= George Robert Twelves Hewes =

American revolutionary (1742–1840)

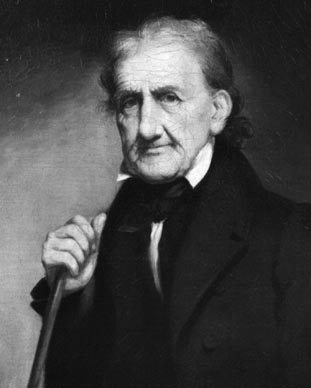
- Portrait of Hewes painted by Joseph G. Cole in 1835
- Born: August 25, 1742; Wrentham, Massachusetts Bay, British America
- Died: November 5, 1840 (aged 98); Richfield Springs, New York
- Burial place: Grand Army of the Republic cemetery, Richfield Springs, New York
- Spouse(s): Sarah Hewes, Sally Sumner
- Children: 15
- Military career
- Allegiance: United States of America: Massachusetts
- Branch: Massachusetts militia Massachusetts Navy (privateer)
- Service years: Massachusetts militia - 1777, 1778, 1780, 1781; Privateer - 1776 (with the Diamond), 1779 (with the Defence)
- Rank: Private
- Other work: Shoemaker

George Robert Twelves Hewes (August 25, 1742 – November 5, 1840) was a participant in the political protests in Boston at the onset of the American Revolution, and one of the last survivors of the Boston Tea Party and the Boston Massacre. Later he fought in the American Revolutionary War as a militiaman and privateer. Shortly before his death at the age of 98, Hewes was the subject of two biographies and much public commemoration.

== Political activity ==
In his biographies, written at the end of his life, Hewes recalled that his participation in the Patriot movement had begun on March 5, 1770, when he joined the mob of Bostonian apprentices and craftsmen at what is now called the Boston Massacre. Hewes joined the crowd in support of Edward Garrick who was harassing Captain-Lieutenant John Goldfinch over a debt that Goldfinch had already paid. Hewes was unarmed during the riot that ensued but was injured when Private Matthew Kilroy struck him in the shoulder with his Brown Bess musket. James Caldwell, who was standing next to Hewes, was one of the five men shot dead. On his way home that night, Hewes had a verbal confrontation with two British soldiers, which he related in an official deposition the next day.

On December 16, 1773, Hewes joined the band of Bostonians who protested the Tea Act by dumping tea into Boston Harbor, an event that is now called the Boston Tea Party. The protesters divided themselves into three boarding parties, each going aboard one of the three tea ships: Dartmouth, Eleanor, and Beaver. Hewes was appointed "boatswain" of his party that boarded Dartmouth, mostly on account of his "whistling talent." In his capacity as boatswain, Hewes went to the captain of the boarded ship to demand the keys to the tea chests. He also fought Captain O'Connor, a fellow protester who was trying to take some of the tea for himself. According to Hewes, it took three hours to empty every tea chest and to throw the content into the Boston Harbor. Like the other protesters, Hewes quietly returned to his place of residence.

In January, Hewes was at the center of the events surrounding the tarring and feathering of John Malcolm, one of the most publicized incidents of its kind. Malcolm was what would later be known as a Loyalist, a supporter of royal authority. A Bostonian, he worked for the British customs service and pursued his duties with a zeal that made him unpopular.

Commoners often "hooted" at Malcolm in the streets, and sailors in Portsmouth, New Hampshire, tarred and feathered him in November 1773. On January 25, 1774, according to the account in The Massachusetts Gazette, Hewes saw Malcolm threatening to strike a young boy with his cane. When Hewes intervened to stop Malcolm, both began arguing, and Malcolm insisted that Hewes should not interfere in the business of a gentleman. When Hewes replied that at least he had never been tarred and feathered himself, Malcolm struck Hewes hard on the forehead with the cane and knocked him unconscious.

Hewes was treated by the noted Patriot doctor Joseph Warren. The cane left a scar that would be visible on Hewes's forehead for the rest of his life. He went to a magistrate's office to swear out a warrant for Malcolm's arrest.

That night, a crowd seized Malcolm in his house and dragged him into King Street. Despite Hewes trying to stop the crowd, Malcolm was stripped to the waist and covered with tar and feathers. The crowd took him to the Liberty Tree, where it threatened first to hang him and then to cut off his ears if he did not apologize for his behavior and renounce his customs commission. Malcolm finally relented and was sent home. The event was reported in newspapers on both sides of the Atlantic.

== Military service ==
In 1775 Boston was put under martial law. Like many Patriots, Hewes fled the city. He sent his family to Wrentham, Massachusetts his birthplace and father's hometown. He himself had to escape Boston by boat. For the majority of the war years Hewes stayed with his family, providing for them. For a few months of each year, however, Hewes signed up to fight, sometimes in the militia and sometimes as a privateer.

Hewes' first period of military service began in the fall of 1776 when he sailed aboard the privateering ship Diamond. It was a successful three-month voyage, resulting in the capture of three enemy vessels. Hewes later recalled that when the voyage dragged on longer, and no additional prizes had been captured, he joined the crew in threatening to mutiny if the captain did not sail back to Providence. Hewes served in the militia for one to three months of 1777. In 1778 he served for another month, seeing action at the Battle of Rhode Island.

In 1779 Hewes signed on with the Connecticut ship of war Defence for an eventful seven-and-a-half-month voyage. After capturing four ships and thousands of dollars in prize money, the ship's captain, Samuel Smedley, refused to give Hewes his share.

Hewes served in the militia twice more, in the autumn months of 1780 and 1781. Once in the closing years of the war Hewes hired a substitute to avoid the draft. The "extreme pressure of his circumstances" and the need to provide for his family precluded another tour with the militia. Hewes' most enduring memories of the war were of a temporary increase in the dignity of his position. The democratic style of leadership in the militia and aboard the privateers left its mark on Hewes, and he never forgot the respect he received from his social superiors during this time.

== Later life ==
George Hewes lived in Wrentham until after the outbreak of the War of 1812. He and Sally had fifteen children, and probably eleven survived birth. He remained a poor shoemaker. In 1812 two of his sons followed in his footsteps and joined the militia. Apparently their willingness to fight was unusual for Wrentham citizens at the time.

After the war George and Sarah Hewes followed a few of their children to Richfield Springs in Otsego County, New York. George was then seventy-four years old. Even in his old age he continued to earn money making shoes. Sarah died in 1828 at the age of 77. In his later years he relied on various friends and relatives for support, moving from house to house. He became, however, a notable figure in the community, being one of the last survivors of the Revolutionary War and appearing at Independence Day festivities in his militia uniform every Fourth of July. During these years Hewes converted to Methodism and began reading the Bible frequently.

== Rediscovery ==
The 1830s were a period when the American Revolution experienced a revival in the public memory. Battles and events from the revolution were being newly commemorated. During this period, in 1833, a writer named James Hawkes discovered Hewes in Richfield Springs and wrote a biography about him, A Retrospect of the Boston Tea-Party.

Hawkes's book became popular, and in 1835 Hewes toured New England as a celebrity. He sat for a portrait by Joseph Cole, called simply The Centenarian, which now hangs in the Old State House in Boston. Benjamin Bussey Thatcher wrote a second biography, Traits of the Tea Party. He was the guest of honor at an elaborate ceremony on the Fourth of July attended by the lieutenant governor and by other Revolutionary War veterans.

== Death ==
Hewes was injured in an accident on July 4, 1840, as he was boarding the carriage to go to the annual festivities. He died on November 5, 1840, aged 98. He was buried without public commemoration in Richfield Springs; in 1896 he was reburied ceremoniously in the town's Grand Army of the Republic cemetery for veterans. He was the last survivor of the Boston Tea Party.
