= Matthew Kilroy =

Matthew Kilroy may refer to:

- Matt Kilroy (1866–1940), baseball pitcher
- Matthew Kilroy (British Army soldier), British soldier convicted of manslaughter in the Boston Massacre
