= Senator Quincy =

Senator Quincy may refer to:

- Josiah Quincy (New Hampshire politician) (1793–1875), New Hampshire State Senate
- Josiah Quincy III (1772–1864), Massachusetts State Senate
- Josiah Quincy Jr. (1802–1882), Massachusetts State Senate
