= Occupation of Boston =

The city of Boston in the colonial Province of Massachusetts Bay was occupied by British troops during two periods:

- To enforce the Townshend Acts, from 1768 until the Boston Massacre in 1770
- To enforce the Intolerable Acts, from 1774 until the end of the Siege of Boston
