= Samuel Gray (Boston Massacre) =

American murder victim (1718–1770)

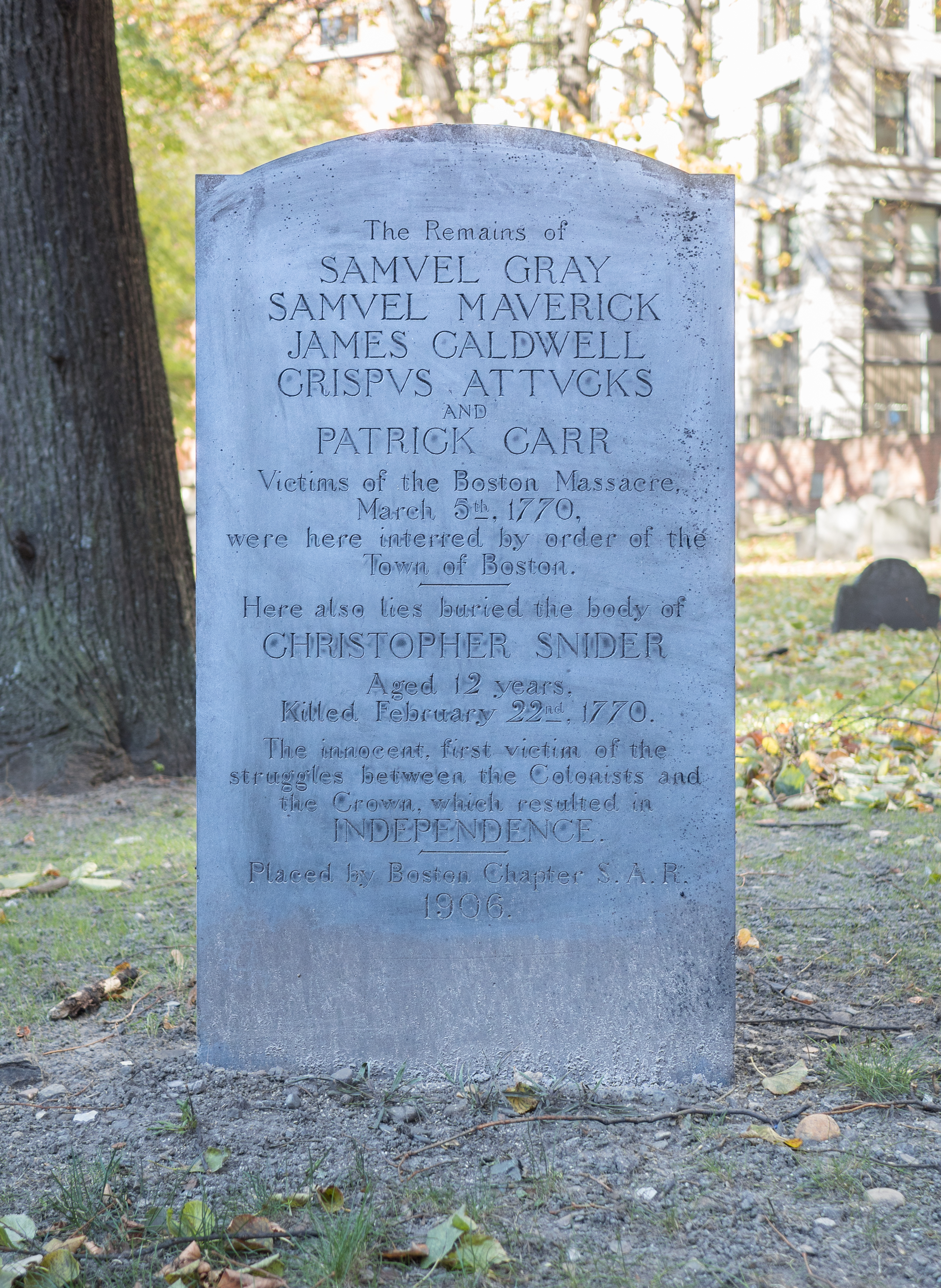
- Samuel Gray's grave in the Granary Burying Ground
- Born: Samuel Gray; August 31, 1718; Tiverton, Rhode Island
- Died: March 5, 1770 (aged 51); Boston, Massachusetts Bay, British America
- Occupation: Rope-maker
- Known for: Death in the Boston Massacre

Samuel Gray (1718–1770) was a son of Edward Gray and Mary (Manchester) Gray of Tiverton, Rhode Island. He married Lois Sampson of Dartmouth, Massachusetts, in 1745 and had three children. He is remembered as among the first five casualties of the American Revolution. He was mortally shot by Private Matthew Kilroy during the Boston Massacre after calling out “God damn you, don’t fire!” when the violence erupted. Gray was a notorious street agitator described as one of the hardiest brawlers employed at John Gray’s ropeworks in Boston. Just days before the Boston Massacre, Gray was among rope-makers involved in a series of fights with British soldiers stationed in Boston since the autumn of 1768. On March 2nd, private Patrick Walker was beaten and cut during a fight that occurred while he was passing through the ropewalk. Local workers were angry with the soldiers seeking employment at the rope works. The soldiers were trying to make extra money to supplement the meager salary paid by the British Army.

== Legacy and honors ==
- 1886, the places where Samuel Gray and Crispus Attucks fell were marked by circles on the pavement. Within each circle, a hub with spokes leads out to form a wheel.
- 1888, Boston Massacre Monument was erected on Boston Common to remember the five men killed by the massacre: Samuel Gray, James Caldwell, Crispus Attucks, Samuel Maverick who died the following morning, and Patrick Carr who died two weeks later.
