= Robert Treat Paine =

Founding Father, Massachusetts attorney general and judge (1731-1814)

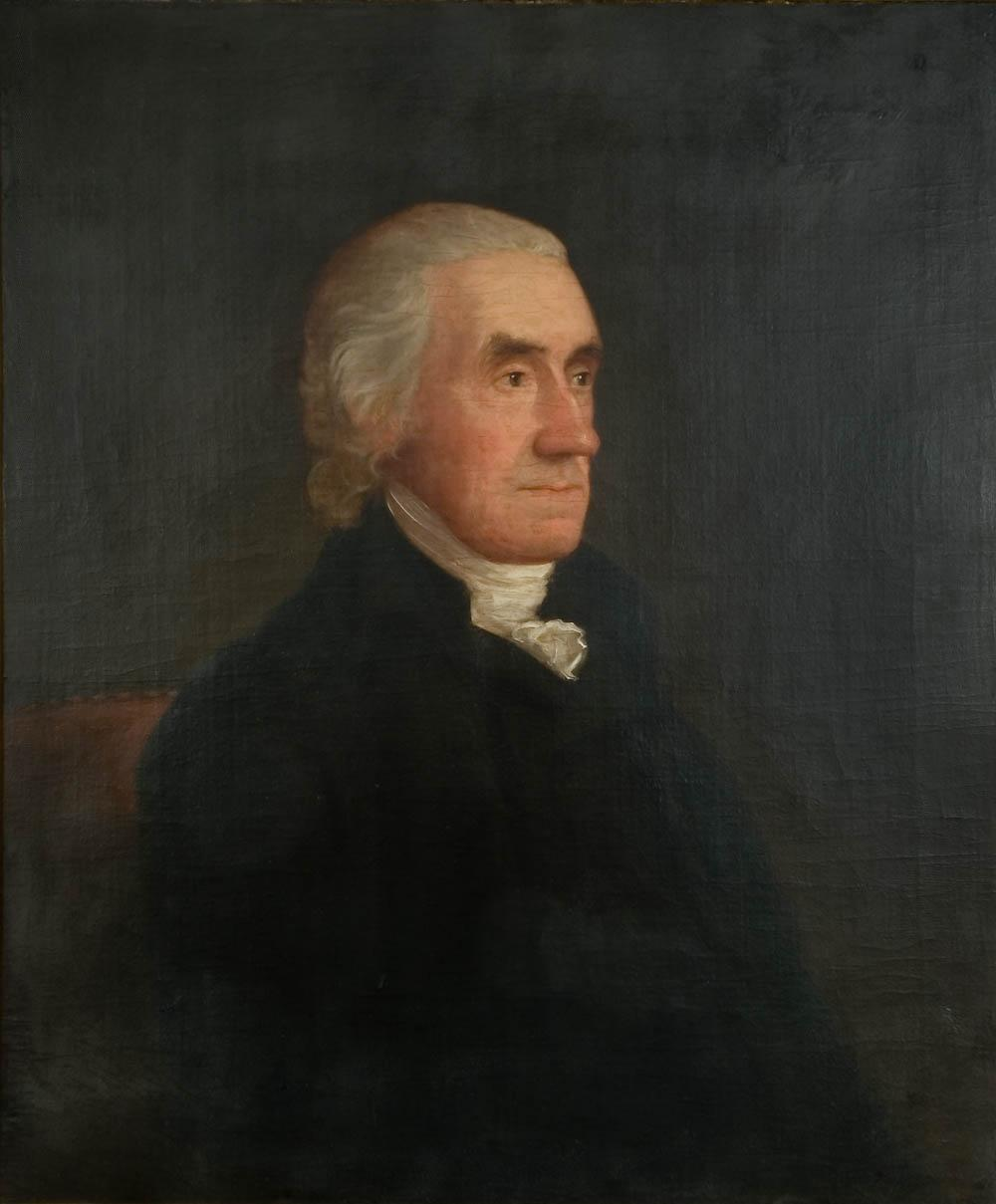
- Portrait of Paine by Edward Savage and John Coles, Jr.
- Born: March 11, 1731; Boston, Province of Massachusetts Bay, British America
- Died: May 11, 1814 (aged 83); Boston, Massachusetts, U.S.
- Resting place: Granary Burying Ground in Boston
- Education: Harvard College
- Occupations: Lawyer, politician
- Known for: Signer of the Declaration of Independence
- Spouse: Sally Cobb (m. 1770–1814; his death)
- Children: 8

Robert Treat Paine (March 11, 1731 – May 11, 1814) was a lawyer, politician, and Founding Father of the United States who signed the Continental Association and Declaration of Independence as a representative of the colonial era Province of Massachusetts Bay, one of the original Thirteen Colonies. He served as the state's first attorney general and as an associate justice of the Massachusetts Supreme Judicial Court, the state's highest court.

== Early life and education ==
Paine's coat of arms

Paine was born in Boston, Province of Massachusetts Bay, in British America, on March 11, 1731, one of five children of the Rev. Thomas Paine and Eunice (Treat) Paine. His father was pastor of Franklin Road Baptist Church in Weymouth but moved his family to Boston in 1730 and subsequently became a merchant there. His mother was the daughter of Rev. Samuel Treat, whose father Maj. Robert Treat was one of the principal founders of Newark, New Jersey, and later a governor of Connecticut. Robert Treat Paine's Treat family had a long history in the British colonies and his Paine family, in particular, can trace a lineage back to the Mayflower.

Paine attended the Boston Latin School and then entered Harvard College at age 14; he graduated in 1749 at age 18.

== Career ==
After graduating from Harvard in 1749, Paine taught school for several years, first back at Boston Latin and later in Lunenburg, Massachusetts. Paine also attempted a merchant career, with journeys to the Carolinas, the Azores, and Spain as well as a whaling voyage to Greenland. He began the study of law in 1755 with his mother's cousin in Lancaster, Massachusetts.

Paine served as a chaplain in the Crown Point Expedition in 1755 during the French and Indian War. Upon returning to civilian life, he did some occasional preaching and returned to his legal studies. In 1756, he returned to Boston to continue his legal preparations with Samuel Prat, and he was admitted to the bar in 1757. He first considered establishing his law practice at Portland (then part of Massachusetts but now in Maine), but instead in 1761 moved to Taunton, Massachusetts, then back to Boston in 1780.

=== Legal career ===
In 1768, he was a delegate to a provincial convention called to meet in Boston. Paine, along with future Solicitor General of Massachusetts Samuel Quincy, conducted the prosecution of Captain Thomas Preston and eight soldiers under his command following the Boston Massacre of March 5, 1770. John Adams was opposing counsel, and Adams' arguments won the jury's sway, and most of the troops were let off.

Paine served in the Massachusetts General Court from 1773 to 1774, in the Provincial Congress from 1774 to 1775, as well as represented Massachusetts at the Continental Congress in Philadelphia from 1774 through 1776. In that Congress, he signed the final appeal to the king, known as the Olive Branch Petition of 1775, and helped frame the rules of debate and acquire gunpowder for the coming war, and in 1776 was one of the signers of the United States Declaration of Independence.

He returned to Massachusetts at the end of December 1776 and was speaker of the Massachusetts House of Representatives in 1777, a member of the executive council in 1779, a member of the committee that drafted the state constitution in 1780. He was Massachusetts Attorney General from 1777 to 1790 and prosecuted the treason trials following Shays' Rebellion. From 1777 to 1785, his acting Attorney General was Benjamin Kent. In 1780, he was a charter member of the American Academy of Arts and Sciences. He last served as a justice of the State Supreme Court from 1790 to 1804 when he retired.

=== Death and legacy ===
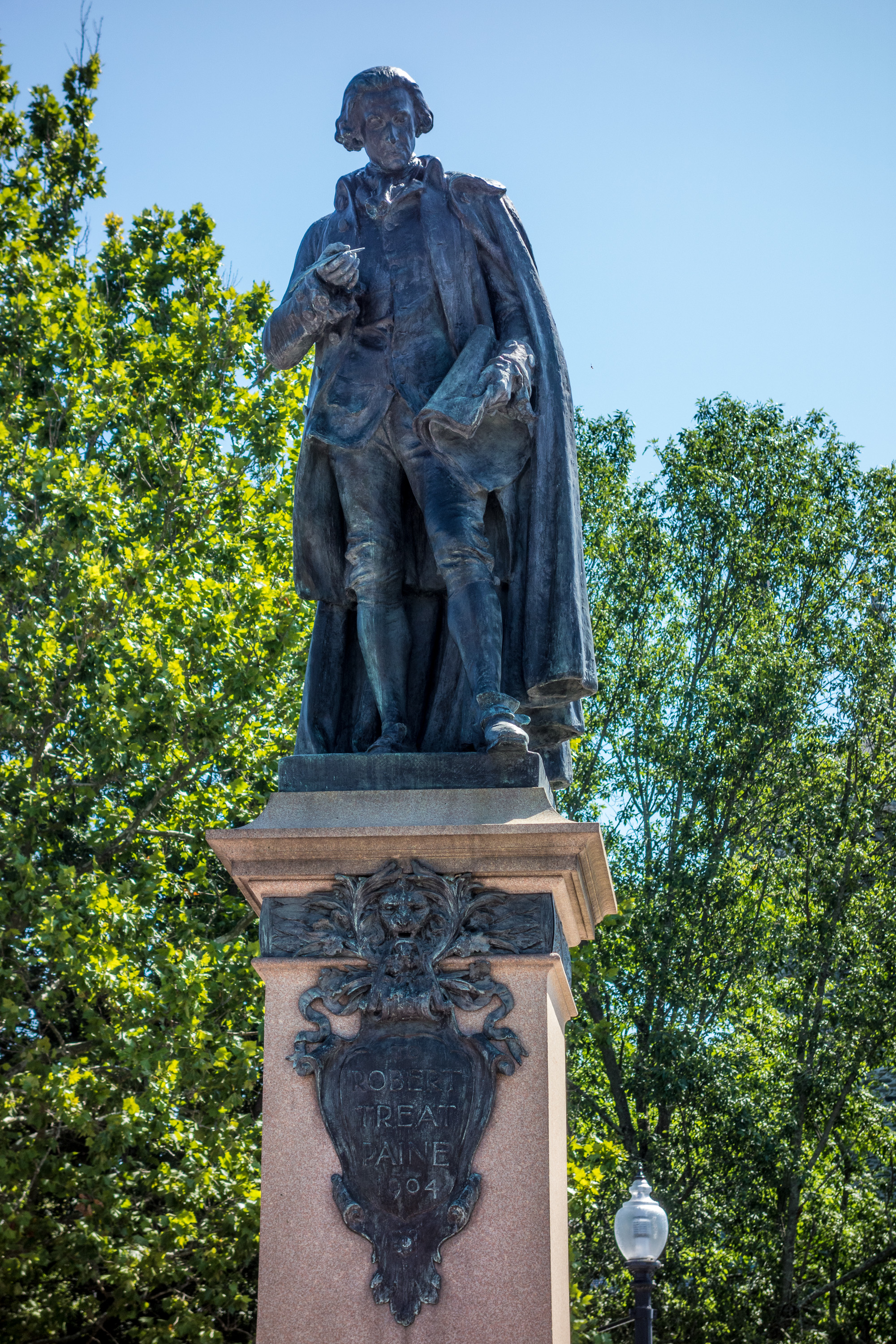
Statue of Paine by Richard E. Brooks, erected in 1904 in Taunton, Massachusetts

Paine died at age 83 in 1814 and was buried in Boston's Granary Burying Ground. Many of his papers, including correspondence and legal notes, are now held by the Massachusetts Historical Society. Paine was a Congregationalist and a devout Christian. When his church, the First Church in Boston, moved into Unitarianism, Paine followed that path. A statue of Paine by Richard E. Brooks was erected at Taunton's Church Green in 1904. Paine is an honoree of the Washington, D.C., Memorial to the 56 Signers of the Declaration of Independence.

Paine married Sally Cobb, the daughter of Thomas and Lydia (née Leonard) Cobb and a sister of General David Cobb, on March 15, 1770. She was born May 15, 1744, and died June 6, 1816. They were the parents of eight children:

- Robert Paine (May 14, 1770 – July 28, 1798), died unmarried, graduate of Harvard College.
- Sally Paine (March 7, 1772 – January 26, 1823), died unmarried.
- Robert Treat Paine Jr. (December 9, 1773 – November 13, 1811), graduate of Harvard College.
- Charles Paine (August 30, 1775 – February 15, 1810), graduate of Harvard College, married Sarah Sumner Cushing (niece of both U.S. Supreme Court associate Justice William Cushing and Massachusetts Governor Increase Sumner).
- Henry Paine (October 20, 1777 – June 8, 1814), married Olive Lyman, daughter of Theodore Lyman.
- Mary Paine (February 9, 1780 – February 27, 1842), married Rev. Elisha Clap, graduate of Harvard College.
- Maria Antoinetta Paine (December 2, 1782 – March 26, 1842), married Deacon Samuel Greele.
- Lucretia Paine (April 30, 1785 – August 27, 1823), died unmarried.

Some of his notable descendants include:

- Charles Jackson Paine
- John Paine
- Robert Treat Paine Storer
- Robert Treat Paine, owner of The Robert Treat Paine Estate, known as Stonehurst
- Lyman Paine. He married, in 1926, Ruth Forbes of the distinguished Forbes family and a great-granddaughter of Ralph Waldo Emerson
- Sumner Paine
- Michael Paine, husband of Ruth Paine
- Robert "Bob" Treat Paine III, zoologist
- Treat Williams, actor
- William W. Treat, lawyer, judge, banker, and Republican Party Official from New Hampshire.

Legal offices
Preceded by Benjamin Kent	Attorney General of Massachusetts; 1778–1790	Succeeded by James Sullivan
Preceded by David Sewall	Associate Justice of the Massachusetts Supreme Judicial Court; 1790–1804	Seat ended
