= Edward Garrick =

Wigmaker's apprentice who started the Boston Massacre

- Born: ca. 1757; Boston, Province of Massachusetts, British America
- Died: Unknown
- Other names: Edward Gerrish, Edward Gerrich
- Occupation: Wigmaker’s apprentice
- Known for: Instigating the Boston Massacre

Edward Garrick (spelled Gerrich and occasionally Gerrish according to some historical documents) was an American wigmaker's apprentice and resident of Boston, Massachusetts, who is known for instigating the Boston Massacre on March 5, 1770.

== Early life ==
Not much is known about Garrick's early childhood, but he was 13 years old when the Boston Massacre took place. Thirteen was a common age for boys to become apprentices in the 18th century, and Garrick was an apprentice at the time of the Massacre. Around 1770, he was employed by John Piemont, a wigmaker and later tavern-keeper. That same year, King George III of the United Kingdom sent 2,000 British soldiers to Boston who became frequent clients of Piemont. It is likely Garrick and other apprentices tended to the wigs of these soldiers six days a week, as that was the average for workers in 1770. During early March 1770, Garrick also worked as an escort for Ann Green and Mary Rogers, the daughter and maid of Boston customs official Bartholomew Green.

== Role in 1770 Boston Massacre ==
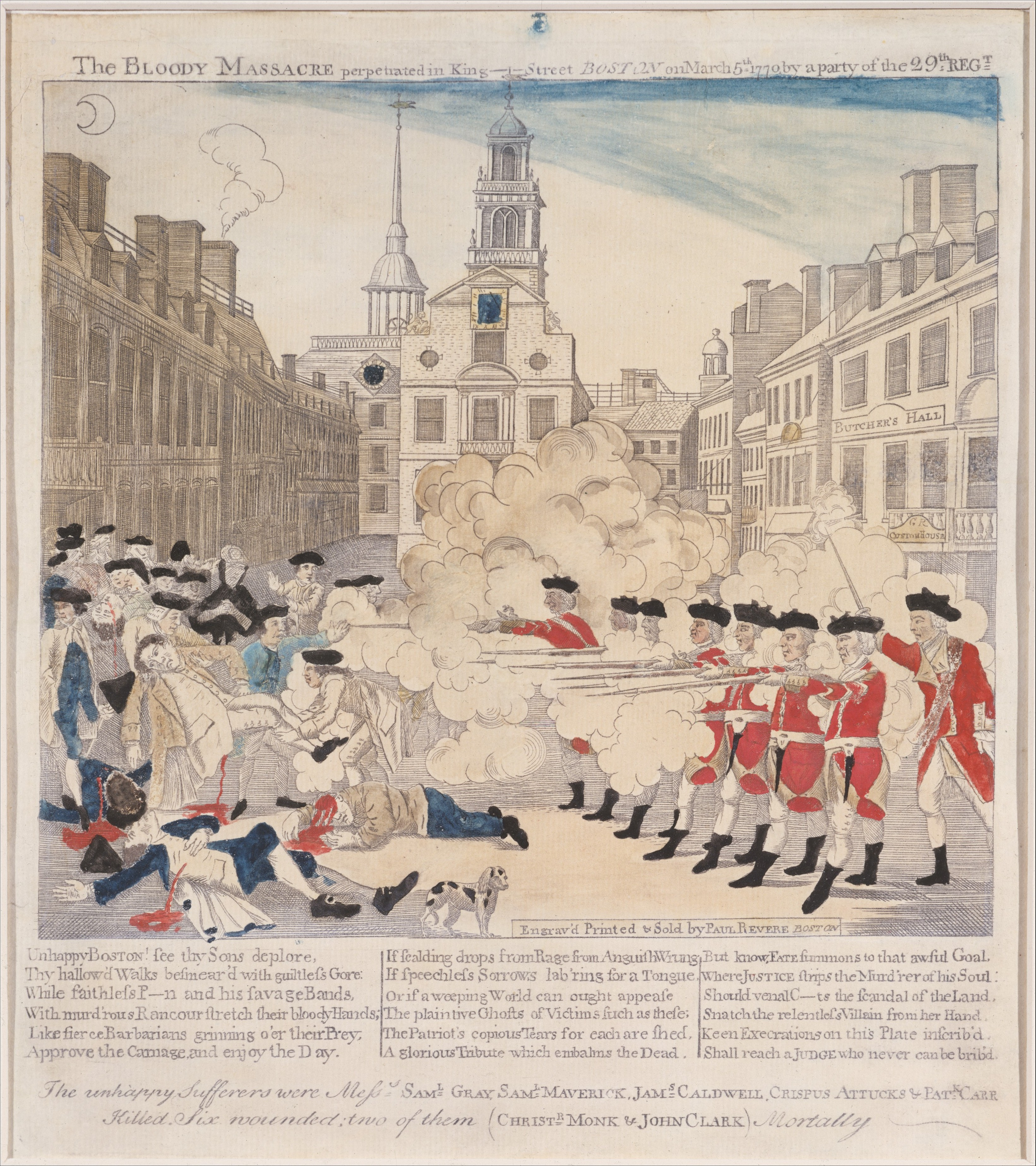
Engraving of the Boston Massacre Garrick initiated, drawn by Paul Revere

During the evening of March 5, 1770, a drunk Edward Garrick and his fellow wigmaker's apprentice Bartholomew Broaders were among a crowd of local youth taunting and throwing snowballs at John Goldfinch, a captain-lieutenant of the British Army. They had arrived here after crossing paths with Goldfinch after escorting Ann Green and Mary Rogers to the now-famous Boston Custom House. Hugh White, a British private of the 29th Regiment of Foot on guard by the Custom House, overheard this and arrived to aid Goldfinch as Garrick mocked the captain-lieutenant for his negligence to pay a bill due to one of the apprentices of John Piemont, which, in fact, had been paid. When White yelled at Garrick, telling him to show more respect to Goldfinch, Garrick responded only with an exchange of insults and a poke. Fed up, White struck Garrick in the head with his musket, causing him to fall and cry out in pain. Upon this, Broaders and other youths began to argue with White and insult him, drawing a large crowd of civilians. Garrick, bleeding, fled to a British barrack, where he spread the word of his injury to a crowd in front of it. This crowd included John Green, a Bostonian tailor who would later testify at the Boston Massacre trials. Meanwhile, the chaos that was ongoing at the Custom House resulted in the Massacre.

== After the Massacre ==
Bartholomew Broaders gave a short account of what happened the evening of March 5 in which Garrick is mentioned talking to British soldier Sergeant Daniels before the Massacre. Broaders' story was published in 1775 and found online. Garrick was first to testify at the Queen Street Courthouse, where Thomas Preston was charged for manslaughter at the Massacre. At the trial, Garrick said only the following:

[I] saw some persons with sticks coming up Quaker Lane. I said to the sentry Capt. Goldsmith owed my fellow apprentice. He said he was a gentlemen and would pay everybody. I said there was none in the Regiment. He asked for me. I went to him, was not ashamed of my face.... The Sentinel left his post and struck me. I cried. My fellow apprentice and a young man came up to the Sentinel and called him Bloody back. He called to the Main Guard, there was not a dozen people when the Sentinel called the Guard.

There are no later records describing of Garrick's later life and death, and he is not listed in Massachusetts Soldiers and Sailors in the War of the Revolution, a historical document listing Massachusetts soldiers serving in the American Revolution. A book entitled The United States Declaration of Independence (Revisited) is one of the few sources that acknowledges his role in the Massacre.
