= Thomas Preston (British Army officer) =

British imperial military officer (1722-1798)

- Born: c. 1722; Ireland
- Died: c. 1798
- Military career
- Allegiance: Kingdom of Great Britain
- Branch: British Army
- Rank: Captain
- Unit: 29th Regiment of Foot
- Conflicts: Boston Massacre

Captain Thomas Preston (c. 1722 – c. 1798) was a British military officer who served in Boston, Massachusetts. He commanded the troops involved in the Boston Massacre in 1770 and was tried for murder, but was acquitted.

== Life ==
Preston was born to a Protestant family in Ireland. He became a captain of the 29th Regiment of Foot, part of the British garrison in Boston under the overall command of Thomas Gage.

=== Boston massacre ===
On 5 March 1770, after an aggressive mob confronted sentry Hugh White, runners summoned Preston from his regiment's nearby barracks. He arrived at the scene with a corporal and six privates, but the contingent failed to disperse the crowd. Preston refrained from ordering his embattled men to fire, but shooting nevertheless broke out, leaving five Bostonians dead. He and the eight soldiers present at the scene were arrested on the orders of Governor Thomas Hutchinson the next morning.

Charges were brought against him and other soldiers, but he was acquitted in a trial held in Boston, Massachusetts. Future United States President John Adams was his attorney. An eyewitness report by John Tudor, who was a merchant, says that Preston gave the order to fire, but many historians believe that he did not. Two of his men, Hugh Montgomery and Matthew Kilroy, were found guilty of manslaughter. They "prayed clergy" to avoid the death sentence. Instead, they were branded on the thumb with a hot iron, the letter "M" for murder. Captain Preston was tried separately. The main issue was whether he had called the order to fire; he was found not guilty.

After his trial, Preston retired from the army. He reportedly settled in Ireland. Adams later recalled seeing him in London in the 1780s, when Adams was serving there as U.S. Minister to Britain.

== In popular culture ==
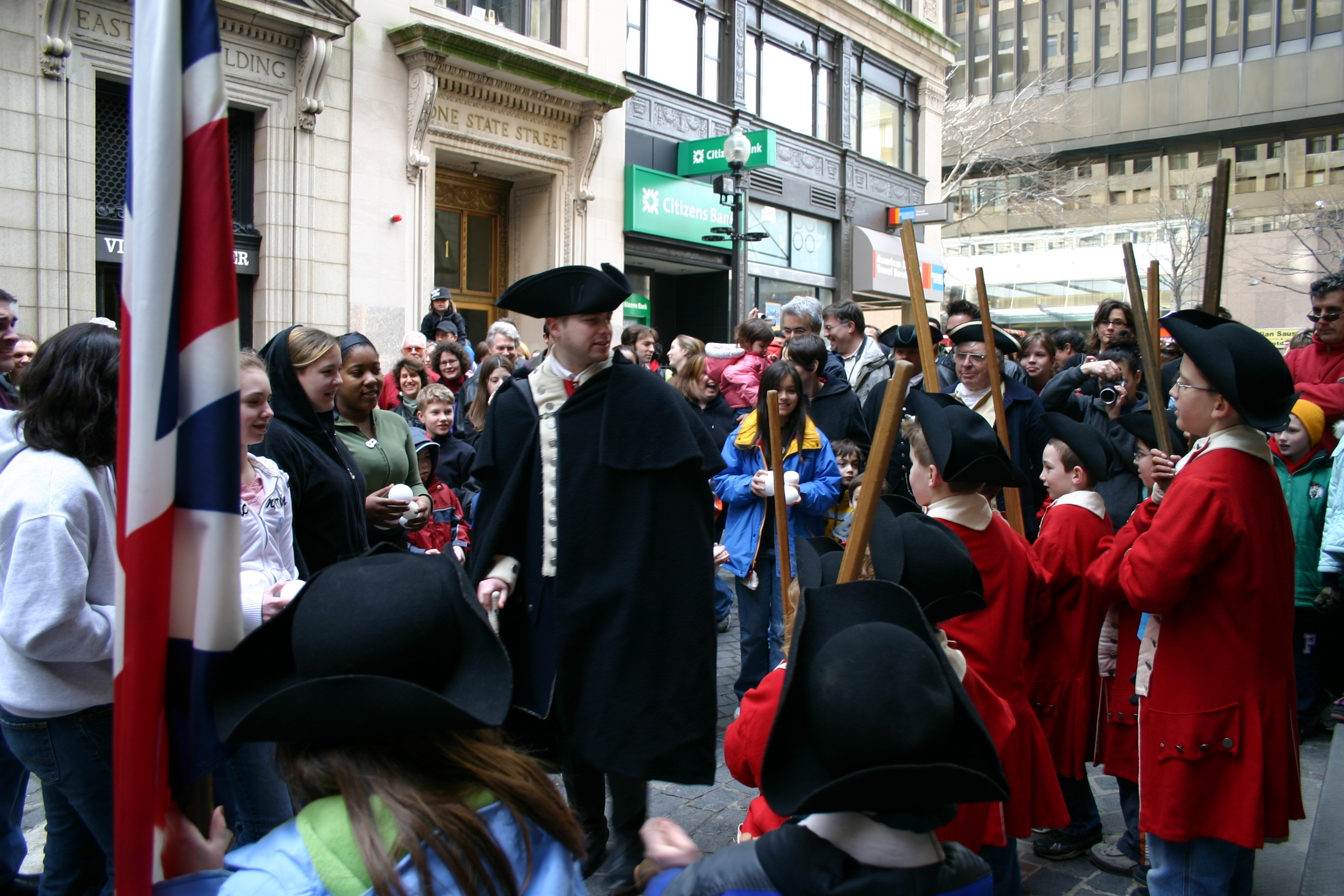
An actor portraying Preston during a re-enactment of the Boston Massacre in 2007.

- In the 2008 American miniseries, John Adams, Preston was played by British actor Ritchie Coster.
- In the 2015 History Channel miniseries, Sons of Liberty, Preston was portrayed by Shane Taylor.

== Bibliography ==
- Hibbert, Christopher. Redcoats and Rebels: The American Revolution Through British Eyes. Avon Books, 1990.
- Zobel, Hiller (1234). The Boston Massacre. New York: W.W. Norton. ISBN 978-0-393-00606-3
- Massacre Soldiers in West's Encyclopedia of American Law, edited by Shirelle Phelps and Jeffrey Lehman, 2nd ed., vol. 2, Gale, 2005, pp. 85–86. Gale In Context: U.S. History Accessed 28 Feb. 2022.
- Tudor, John. An Eyewitness Describes the Boston Massacre (1770) The American Revolution, Primary Source Media, 1999. American Journey. Gale In Context: U.S. History. Accessed 28 Feb. 2022.
- Linder, Douglas. "The Boston Massacre Trials: An Account." Available at SSRN 1021327 (2007).
- Reid, John Phillip. "A Lawyer Acquitted: John Adams and the Boston Massacre Trials." The American Journal of Legal History 18.3 (1974): 189–207.
