= Crispus Attucks =

Boston Massacre victim (1723–1770)

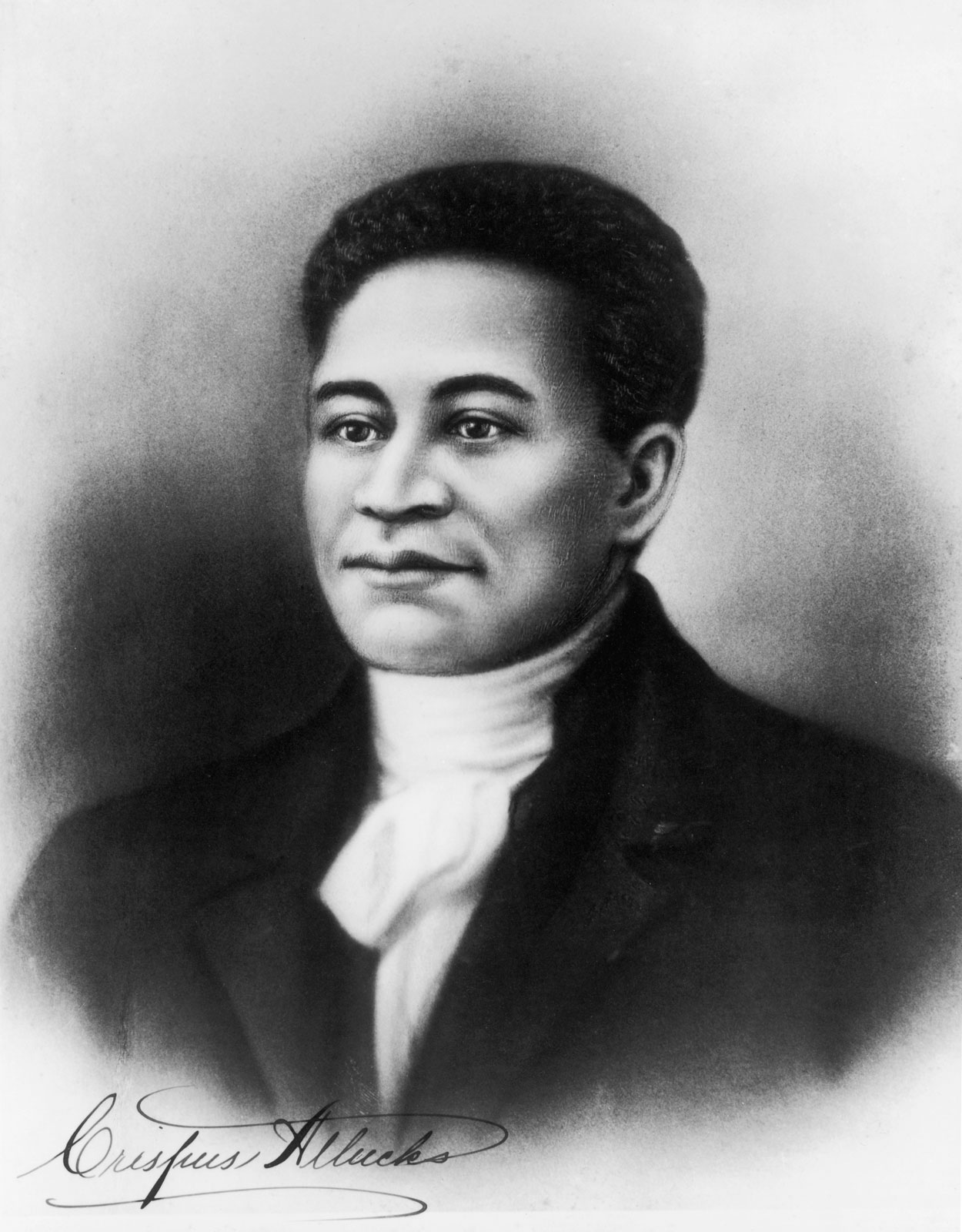
- Speculative portrait of what Attucks might have looked like.
- Born: c. 1723; Framingham, Massachusetts Bay, British America
- Died: March 5, 1770 (aged about 47); Boston, Massachusetts Bay, British America
- Occupations: Whaler, sailor, stevedore
- Known for: Death in the Boston Massacre

Crispus Attucks (c. 1723 – March 5, 1770) was an American whaler, sailor, and stevedore of African American and Native American descent who is traditionally regarded as the first person killed in the Boston Massacre, and as a result the first American killed in the American Revolution.

Although he is widely remembered as the first American casualty of the American Revolutionary War, 11-year-old Christopher Seider was shot a few weeks earlier by customs officer Ebenezer Richardson on February 22, 1770. Historians disagree on whether Attucks was a free man or an escaped slave, but most agree that he was of Wampanoag and African descent. Two major sources of eyewitness testimony about the Boston Massacre published in 1770 did not refer to him as black or as a Negro; it appears he was instead viewed by Bostonians as being of mixed ethnicity. According to a contemporaneous account in the Pennsylvania Gazette, he was a "Mulattoe man, named Crispus Attucks, who was born in Framingham, but lately belonged to New Providence, and was here in order to go for North Carolina."

Attucks became an icon of the anti-slavery movement in the mid-19th century. Supporters of the abolition movement lauded him for playing a heroic role in the history of the United States.

== Early life and ethnic origins ==
Attucks was born in Framingham, Massachusetts. Town histories of Framingham written in 1847 and 1887 describe him as a slave of Deacon William Brown, though it is unclear whether Brown was his original owner. In 1750, Brown advertised for the return of a runaway slave named Crispas. The advertisement from the Boston Gazette states:

Ran-away from his Master William Brown, of Framingham, on the 30th of Sept. last, a Molatto Fellow, about 27 Years of Age, name Crispas, 6 feet two Inches high, short curl'd Hair, his Knees near together than common; had on a light colour'd Bearskin Coat, plain brown Fustian Jacket, or brown all-Wool one, new Buckskin Breeches, blue Yarn Stockings, and a check'd woollen Shirt.

Brown promised a reward of 10 pounds to whoever found and returned Attucks to him. As the Wampanoag typically had straight black hair, Attucks being described as having short, curly hair is not consistent with his being a full-blooded Indian, but it is consistent with his having a mixed African-Wampanoag ancestry. Attucks's status at the time of the massacre as a free person or a runaway slave has been a matter of debate for historians.

Attucks became a sailor and whaler, and he spent much of his life at sea or working around the docks along the Atlantic seaboard. In an 1874 article in The American Historical Record, Jebe B. Fisher recounts a passage in the memoirs of Boston Tea Party participant George R.T. Hewes, which stated that at the time of the massacre, Attucks "was a Nantucket Indian, belonging on board a whale ship of Mr. Folgers, then in the harbor, and he remembers a distinct war whoop which he yelled... the mob whistling, screaming, and rending like an Indian yell." Attucks often went by the alias Michael Johnson to avoid being caught after his escape from slavery. He may only have been temporarily in Boston in early 1770, having recently returned from a voyage to the Bahamas. He was due to leave shortly afterward on a ship for North Carolina.

Today, Crispus Attucks is commonly described as an African American in popular culture as the term 'mulatto' is rarely used in the United States, unlike in the 18$^\text{th}$ century colonies, and everyone with African ancestry is considered Black. In 1770, two major sources of eyewitness testimony about the Massacre did not refer to Attucks as "Black" or as a "Negro," but rather as a mulatto and an Indian. In an account from Philadelphia's Pennsylvania Gazette, a man who may have been Attucks was referred to as a "Mulattoe man, named Crispas, who was born in Framingham, but lately belonged to New-Providence, and was here in order to go for North Carolina." However, during Attucks's time, mulatto was often used to describe skin tone rather than ethnicity, and, in Spanish or Portuguese colonies, sometimes referred to full-blooded Native Americans. However, since "Crispas" was known to have short curly hair, it is unlikely that he would have been a full-blooded Indian. In Potter's American Monthly published in 1872, the interchangeability of the two terms appears to be demonstrated by a short section of the court transcripts from the Attucks trial:

Question: Did you see a mulatto among the persons who surrounded the soldiers?

Answer: I did not observe...
Question: Did they seem to be sailors or townsmen?
Answer: They were dressed some of them in the habits of sailors.
Question: Did you know the Indian who was killed?
Answer: No.
Question: Did you see any of them press on the soldiers with a cordwood stick?

Answer: No.

Historians differ in opinion on Attucks's heritage: some assert his family had intermarried with African slaves, while others maintain he had no African heritage. It is widely acknowledged that Attucks had considerable Native American heritage.

Biographer Mitch Kachun, as well as multiple 19th century Framingham town histories, have drawn a connection between Attucks and John Attuck of Framingham, a Narragansett man who was hanged in Framingham in 1676 during King Philip's War. The word for "deer" in the Narragansett language is "Attuck." Kachun also noted a possible connection to a probable Natick woman and possible Attucks mother or relative named Nanny Peterattucks, who is described as a 'negro woman' in the 1747 estate inventory of Framingham slaveholder Joseph Buckminster and, along with Jacob Peterattucks, as 'probable descendant of John Attuck, the Indian' in an 1847 history of Framingham. Other sources refer to their surname as Peter Attucks. In a 1747 history of the Hoosac Valley, an African colonial militiaman named Moses Peter Attucks, living in nearby Leicester, is described as a 'negro slave of John White'; elsewhere he is listed as Moses Attucks. Jacob Peterattucks and Nanny Peterattucks are recorded as slaves with Joseph Buckminster in 1730, and in 1740 Jacob with Thomas Buckminster, who was appointed by Framingham in 1739 to lead a commission for the preservation of deer in the area. Historian William C. Nell reported an 1860 letter from a Natick resident, also printed in an 1860 edition of The Liberator newspaper that read,

Several persons are now living in Natick who remember the Attucks family, viz., Cris, who was killed March 5th; Sam, whose name was abbreviated into Sam Attucks, or Smattox; Sal, also known as Slattox; and Peter, called Pea Tattox [...] my mother, still living, aged 89, remembers Sal in particular, who used to be called the gourd-shell squaw, from the fact that she used to carry her rum in a gourd shell [...] the whole family are said to be the children of Jacob Peter Attucks... it has been conjectured that they are of Indian blood, but all who knew the descendants describe them as negroes.

The letter continues, "his sister [Sal] used to say that if they had not killed Cris, Cris would have killed them."

Prince Yonger has been posited as the father of Attucks. However, according to Framingham town histories, Yonger did not arrive in Massachusetts until 1725, after Attucks was born, and did not marry Nanny Peterattucks until 1737, after which point they had children, who are noted in multiple town histories but among whom Crispus is not mentioned: "a son, who died young, and Phebe, who never married." It is possible Yonger became Attucks' stepfather in 1737, though it is unclear whether Attucks had permanently left his mother's home by that point. Neither Phebe nor the son are recorded with the Attucks or Peterattucks surname.

== Boston Massacre ==
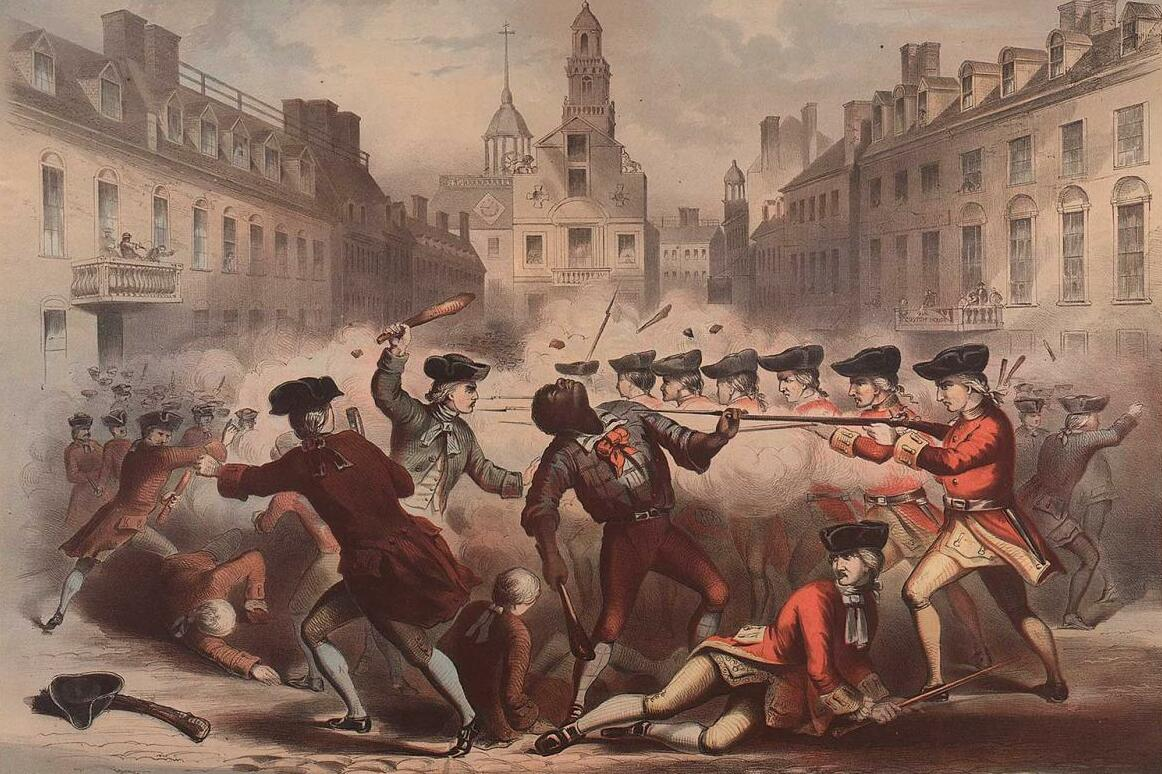
This 19th-century lithograph is a variation of the famous engraving of the Boston massacre by Paul Revere. Produced soon before the American Civil War and long after the event depicted, this image emphasizes Crispus Attucks, who had become a symbol for abolitionists. (John Bufford after William L. Champey, c. 1856)

In the fall of 1768, British troops were sent to Boston to maintain order amid growing colonial unrest which had led to a spate of attacks on local officials following the introduction of the Stamp Act and the subsequent Townshend Acts. Radical Whigs had coordinated waterfront mobs against the authorities. The presence of troops, instead of reducing tensions, served to further inflame them.

After dusk on March 5, 1770, a wigmaker's apprentice mistakenly accused a British officer of not paying a bill. The officer ignored his insults but a sentry intervened after the boy began physically assaulting the officer. Both townspeople and nine soldiers of the 29th Regiment of Foot gathered. The colonists threw snowballs and debris at the soldiers. A group of men including Attucks approached the Old State House armed with clubs and sticks. A soldier was struck with a piece of wood, an act some witnesses claimed was done by Attucks. Other witnesses stated that Attucks was "leaning upon a stick" when the soldiers opened fire.

Five colonists were killed and six were wounded. Attucks took two ricocheted bullets in the chest and was believed to be the first to die. County coroners Robert Pierpoint and Thomas Crafts Jr. conducted an autopsy on Attucks. He was "felled by two bullets to his chest, one of them 'goring the right lobe of the lungs and a great part of the liver most horribly'." Attucks' body was carried to Faneuil Hall, where it lay in state until Thursday, March 8, 1770, when he and the other victims were buried together in the same grave site in Boston's Granary Burying Ground. He was approximately 47 years old.

== Reaction and trials ==
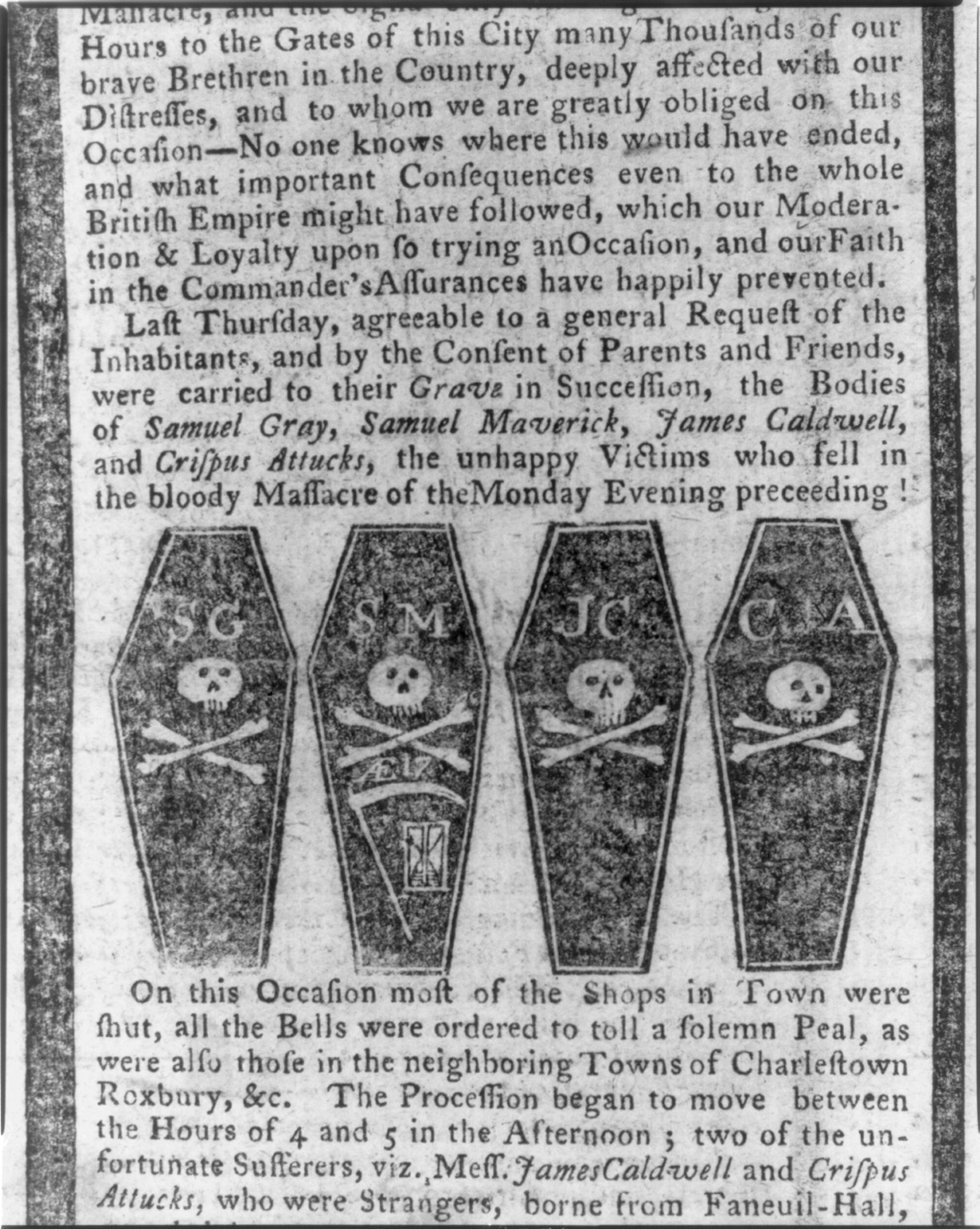
Boston Gazette newspaper report, March 12, 1770, four days after the funeral. The illustration of the coffins shows the initials of the four victims buried March 8.

John Adams successfully defended most of the accused soldiers against a charge of murder. Two were found guilty of manslaughter. Faced with the prospect of hanging, the soldiers pleaded benefit of clergy, and were instead branded on their thumbs. In his arguments, Adams called the crowd "a motley rabble of saucy boys, negros and molattoes, Irish teagues and outlandish Jack Tarrs." In particular, he charged Attucks with having "undertaken to be the hero of the night," and with having precipitated a conflict by his "mad behavior."

Two years later United States Founding Father Samuel Adams, a cousin of John Adams, named the event the "Boston Massacre," and helped ensure it would not be forgotten. Boston artist Henry Pelham (half-brother of the celebrated portrait painter John Singleton Copley) created an image of the event. Paul Revere made a copy from which prints were made and distributed. Some copies of the print show a dark-skinned man with chest wounds, presumably representing Crispus Attucks. Other copies of the print show no difference in the skin tones of the victims.

The five who were killed were buried as heroes in the Granary Burying Ground, which also contains the graves of Samuel Adams, John Hancock, and other notable figures. Customs of the period discouraged the burial of black people and white people together, with "black burials relegated to the rear or far side of the cemetery. Such a practice was not completely unknown, however. Prince Hall, for example, was interred in Copp's Hill Burying Ground in the North End of Boston 39.

== Legacy and honors ==
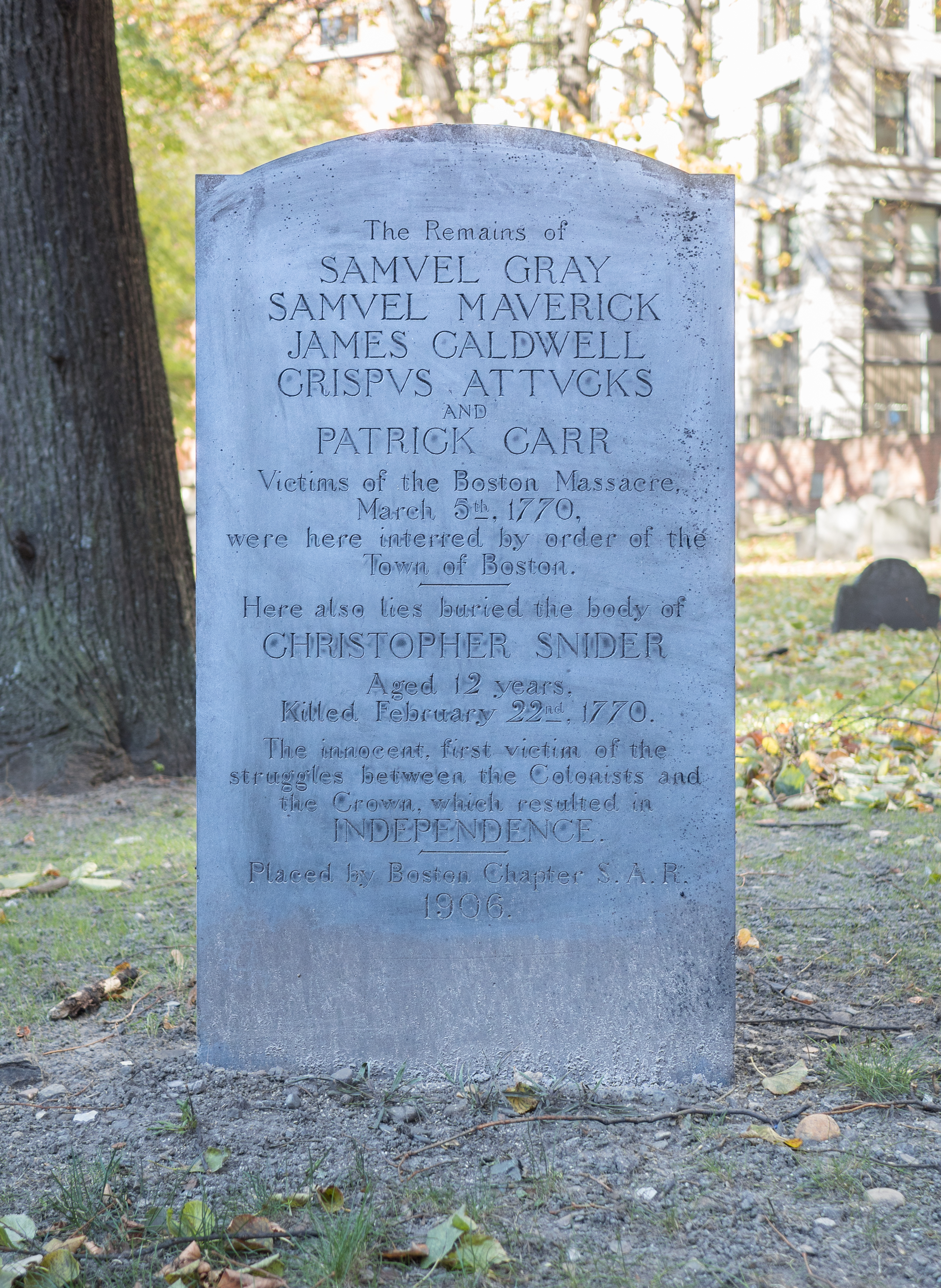
Crispus Attucks' grave in the Granary Burying Ground

- 1858, Boston-area abolitionists, including William Cooper Nell, established "Crispus Attucks Day" to commemorate him.
- 1886, the places where Crispus Attucks and Samuel Gray fell were marked by circles on the pavement. Within each circle, a hub with spokes leads out to form a wheel.
- 1888, a monument honoring Attucks and the other victims of the Boston Massacre was erected on Boston Common. It is over 25 feet high and about 10 feet wide. The "bas-relief" (raised portion on the face of the main part of the monument) portrays the Boston Massacre, with Attucks lying in the foreground. Under the scene is the date, March 5, 1770. Above the bas-relief stands a female figure, Free America, holding the broken chain of oppression in her right hand. Beneath her right foot, she crushes the royal crown of England. At the left of the figure is an eagle. Thirteen stars are cut into one of the faces of the monument. Beneath these stars in raised letters are the names of the five men who were killed that day: Crispus Attucks, Samuel Gray, James Caldwell, Samuel Maverick, and Patrick Carr. Some men died a day later.
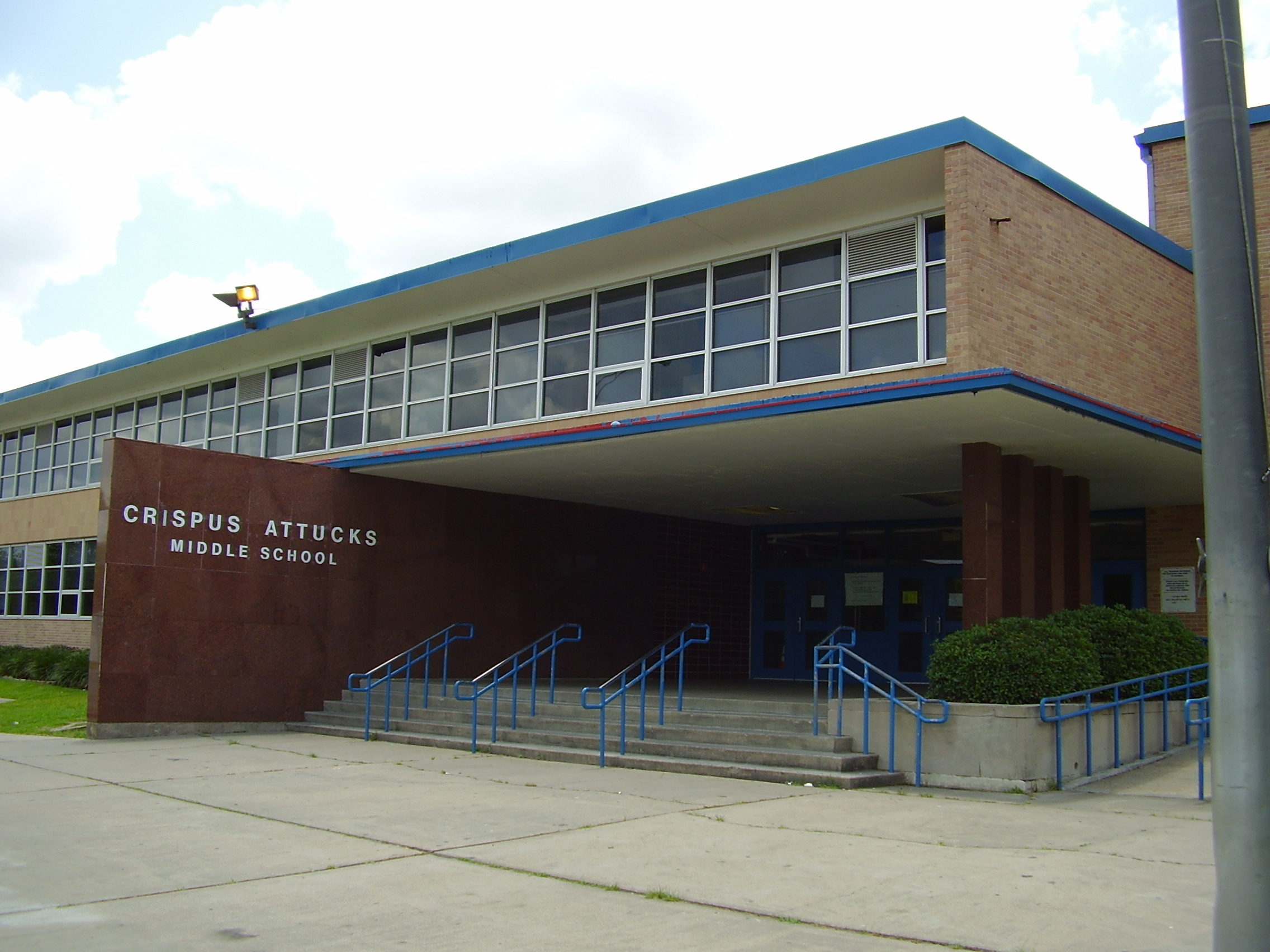
  Crispus Attucks Middle School, Sunnyside, Houston, Texas
  Although that year leaders of the Massachusetts Historical Society and the New England Historic Genealogical Society opposed the creation of the Crispus Attucks memorial, since the 20th century both organizations have acknowledged his role and promoted interest in black history and genealogy.
- 1940, Attucks was honored with 1 of the 33 dioramas at the American Negro Exposition in Chicago.
- 1998, the United States Treasury released the "Black Revolutionary War Patriots Silver Dollar" coin featuring Attucks' image on the obverse side. Funds from sales of the coin were intended for a proposed Black Revolutionary War Patriots Memorial in Washington, D.C.
- 2002, the Afrocentrist scholar Molefi Kete Asante listed Crispus Attucks as among the 100 Greatest African Americans.
- Institutions named for Attucks include the Crispus Attucks High School in Indianapolis, Indiana; Attucks High School in Hopkinsville, Kentucky; Attucks Middle School in Sunnyside, Houston, Texas; the Crispus Attucks Elementary School in Kansas City, Missouri; the Attucks Middle School in Dania Beach, Florida; the Attucks Theatre in Norfolk, Virginia; the Crispus Attucks Association in York, Pennsylvania; Crispus Attucks Road in Spring Valley, New York; Crispus Attucks Elementary School in Bedford-Stuyvesant, Brooklyn; Crispus Attucks Park in Carbondale, Illinois; Crispus Attucks Elementary School in East St. Louis, Illinois; Crispus Attucks Park in Washington, DC; the Crispus Attucks Center in Dorchester, Massachusetts; Crispus Attucks Place, a residential street in Roxbury, Boston, Massachusetts; and the Crispus Attucks Bridge in Framingham, Massachusetts.
- The Wellcome Library, in London, owns a notebook bound in what a note with it claims is Attucks' skin, although the library believes the book's leather actually comes from camel, horse, or goat.

== In popular culture ==
- "First man to die for the flag we now hold high was a black man" is a line from Stevie Wonder's 1976 song "Black Man".
- "Crispus Attucks, the first blasted" is a line from Nas's 2008 song "You Can't Stop Us Now".
- The poet John Boyle O'Reilly wrote the following poem when the monument was finally unveiled:

And to honor Crispus Attucks who was the leader and voice that day: The first to defy, and the first to die, with Maverick, Carr, and Gray. Call it riot or revolution, or mob or crowd as you may, such deaths have been seeds of nations, such lives shall be honored for aye [...]

- Melvin Tolson begins his poem "Dark Symphony" with the lines: "Black Crispus Attucks taught / Us how to die / Before white Patrick Henry's bugle breath / Uttered the Vertical / Transmitting cry: / 'Yea, give me liberty or give me death.'"
- Martin Luther King Jr. referred to Crispus Attucks in the introduction of Why We Can't Wait (1964) as an example of a man whose contribution to history provided a potent message of moral courage.
- In the successful sitcom The Fresh Prince of Bel-Air, Will Smith names Crispus Attucks as one of many inspirational African-American figures in history when he tries to explain why he is failing history.
- In February 2012, Wayne Brady, J. B. Smoove, and Michael Kenneth Williams, as well as Keith David, appeared in a satirical rap music video about Crispus Attucks.
- In the Netflix series Luke Cage, based on the Marvel Comics character of the same name, there is a housing development called the Crispus Attucks Complex, named in honor of Attucks. Cage also explains Attucks' role in the Boston Massacre at the end of the second episode of the series.
- Spike Lee's 2020 film Da 5 Bloods refers to Crispus Attucks.
