= Hugh Montgomery (British Army soldier) =

18th century Irish soldier, participant in the Boston Massacre

- Born: 1735 (approximate); Antrim, County Antrim, Kingdom of Ireland
- Occupation: Soldier
- Spouse: Isabella
- Children: 3
- Convictions: Manslaughter (5 December 1770)
- Penalty: Branded on the thumb

Details
- Victims: Crispus Attucks
- Date: 5 March 1770
- Locations: Boston, Massachusetts
- Weapon: Flintlock musket

Private Hugh Montgomery (fl. 1770) was an Irish soldier who served in the 29th Regiment of Foot and was present at the Boston Massacre, for which he was found guilty of the manslaughter of one of the five fatalities, Crispus Attucks.

== Early life ==
Montgomery was born in Antrim, County Antrim, Ireland. A laborer without a skilled trade, he joined the 29th Regiment of Foot at age 21, and sometime before March 1770, joined their grenadier company.

== Boston Massacre ==
On 5 March 1770, seven soldiers from the 29th Regiment of Foot, including Montgomery, were dispatched to King Street in Boston, Massachusetts, to relieve private soldier Hugh White. Montgomery was the first soldier to fire against a hostile crowd of colonists surrounding them in what subsequently became known as the Boston Massacre. On 27 March, Montgomery was indicted for murder. He was held in prison pending trial, which took place in November–December 1770, in Boston. John Adams, who would later become President of the United States, was his attorney.

Montgomery and fellow soldier Matthew Kilroy were both found guilty of manslaughter on 5 December. They returned to court nine days later and "prayed clergy" to avoid the death sentence. Instead, they were branded on the thumb, with a hot iron, the letter "M" for murder. The two reportedly burst into tears before receiving the punishment.

Montgomery had a wife, Isabella, and three children (Mary, Esther, and William) staying with him in Boston. A deposition from a neighbor taken after the massacre recounted that, hearing the commotion on the night of the 5th, Isabella declared that "the town was too haughty and proud," and that "many of their arses would be laid low by morning." Hearing this, another Bostonian, Susanna Cathcart replied with, "I hope your husband will be killed." Isabella reportedly responded, "My husband is able and will stand his ground."

After the trial, Montgomery rejoined his regiment in New Jersey before then returning to England. In 1776, the 29th was ordered back to America to join the war, putting Montgomery and Kilroy at risk of capture and recognition. On February 22, the two appeared before the pension board in Chelsea, where both were discharged and granted pensions.
