= Josiah Quincy (New Hampshire politician) =

American politician

President of the New Hampshire Senate
- In office 1841–1842
- Preceded by: James B. Creighton
- Succeeded by: Titus Brown

Member of the New Hampshire Senate
- In office 1841–1842

Member of the New Hampshire Senate
- In office January 2, 1907 – April 5, 1907

Member of the New Hampshire House of Representatives
- In office 1859–1860

Member of the New Hampshire House of Representatives
- In office 1850–1850

Member of the New Hampshire House of Representatives
- In office 1837–1840

Member of the New Hampshire House of Representatives
- In office 1824–1825

Personal details
- Born: March 7, 1793 Lenox, Massachusetts
- Died: January 19, 1875 (aged 81) Rumney, New Hampshire

Josiah Quincy (March 7, 1793 – January 19, 1875) was an American politician and lawyer who served as the President of the New Hampshire Senate.

Quincy was born March 7, 1793, in Lenox, Massachusetts, and moved to Rumney, New Hampshire, after being admitted to the bar.

Quincy died on January 19, 1875, in Rumney.

== Notes ==
Political offices
Preceded by James B. Creighton	President of the New Hampshire Senate; 1841-1842	Succeeded by Titus Brown
