= Boston Massacre =

1770 shooting deaths of five colonists by British soldiers

- Part of the American Revolution
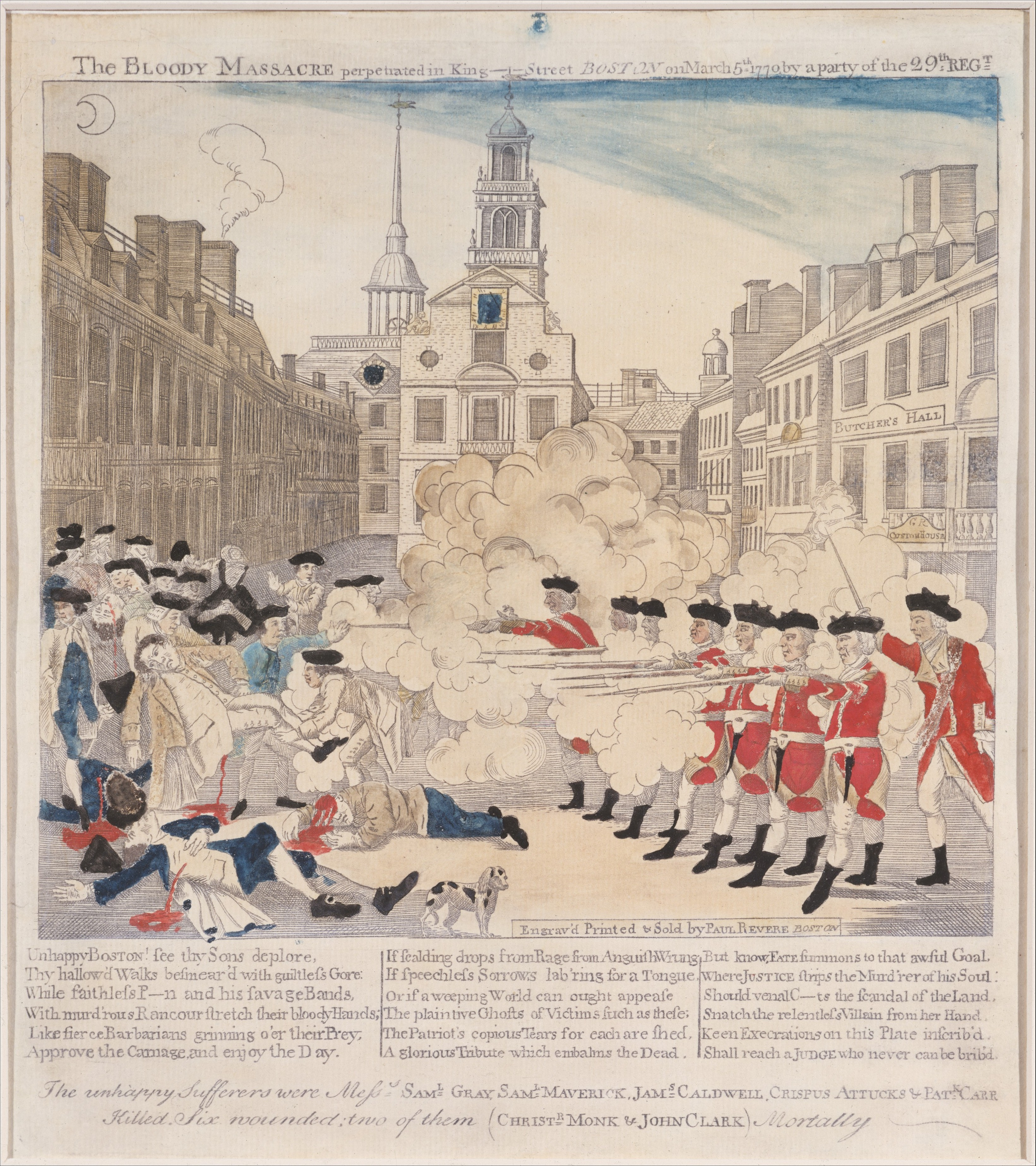
- The Bloody Massacre by Paul Revere, a 1770 engraving depicting the Boston Massacre in March 1770
- Date: March 5, 1770 (256 years ago)
- Location: Boston, Province of Massachusetts Bay, British America; 42°21′31.6″N 71°03′25.8″W
- Caused by: Townshend Acts; Occupation of Boston; Killing of Christopher Seider and the pardon of his killer
- Result: Five American colonists killed
- Type: Mass shooting, manslaughter
- Accused: Thomas Preston; William Wemms; Hugh Montgomery; John Carroll; James Hartigan; William McCauley; William Warren; Matthew Kilroy; Four civilians
- Convicted: Montgomery, Kilroy
- Charges: Murder
- Verdict: Montgomery and Kilroy found guilty on the lesser offense of manslaughter; Remaining accused found not guilty
- Sentence: Montgomery, Kilroy: Branding of the thumb

Parties
29th Regiment	Mob of colonists

Lead figures
Captain Thomas Preston	None

Number
8	300–400

Casualties and losses
Minor injuries	Five killed

The Boston Massacre, known in Great Britain as the Incident on King Street, was a confrontation on March 5, 1770, in the prelude to the American Revolution in Boston, in what was then the colony of the Province of Massachusetts Bay.

In the confrontation, nine British soldiers shot several in a crowd, estimated between 300 and 400, who were harassing them verbally and throwing various projectiles. Five American colonists were killed. The event was subsequently described as "a massacre" by Samuel Adams, Paul Revere, and other leading Patriots who later became central proponents of independence during the American Revolution and Revolutionary War. British troops had been stationed in the Province of Massachusetts Bay since 1768 in order to support Crown-appointed officials and to enforce unpopular legislation implemented by the British Parliament.

Amid tense relations between the civilians and the soldiers, a mob formed around a British sentry and verbally abused him. He was eventually supported by seven additional soldiers, led by Captain Thomas Preston, who were hit by clubs, stones, and snowballs. Eventually, one soldier fired, prompting the others to fire without an order by Preston. The gunfire instantly killed three people and wounded eight others, two of whom later died of their wounds.

The crowd eventually dispersed after acting governor Thomas Hutchinson promised an inquiry, but they reformed the next day, prompting the withdrawal of the troops to Castle Island. Eight soldiers, one officer, and four civilians were arrested and charged with murder, and they were defended in court by attorney, and future U.S. president, John Adams. Six of the soldiers were acquitted; the other two were convicted of manslaughter and sentenced to branding on the thumb, according to the law at that time.

Depictions, reports, and propaganda about the event, notably the colored engraving The Bloody Massacre, heightened tensions throughout the Thirteen Colonies.

== Background ==
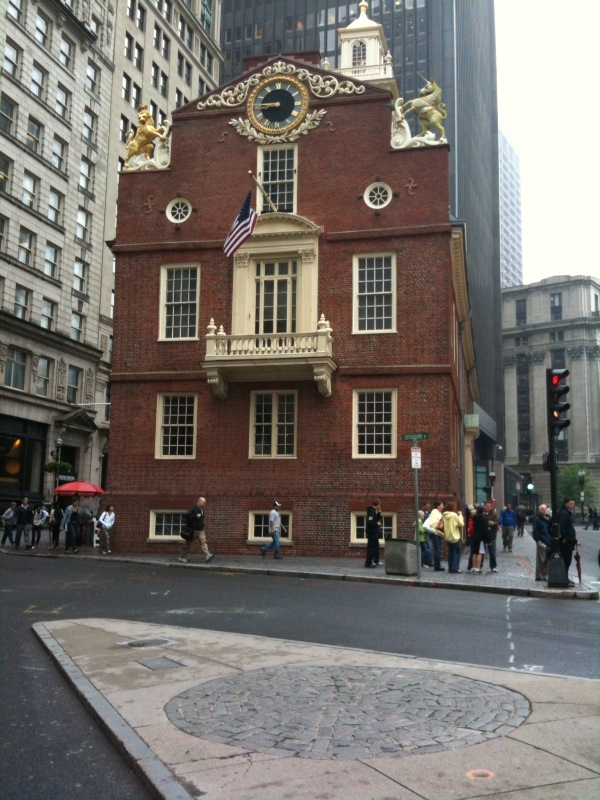
Old State House in Boston, the capital of the Province of Massachusetts during the colonial era from 1713 to 1776; the cobblestone circle is labeled "Site of the Boston Massacre", but the Boston Massacre occurred nearby on what now is a busy Boston street.

In the 18th century, Boston was the capital of the Province of Massachusetts Bay, an important shipping town, and along with Philadelphia and present-day New York City, one of the most influential political, economic, and cultural cities in the Thirteen Colonies of pre-Revolutionary British America. Boston also was a center of resistance to unpopular acts of taxation by the British Parliament in the 1760s.

In 1768, the Townshend Acts were enacted in the Thirteen Colonies, placing tariffs on a variety of common items that were manufactured in Britain and imported in the colonies. Colonists objected that the Acts were a violation of the natural, charter, and constitutional rights of British subjects in the colonies. The Massachusetts House of Representatives began a campaign against the Acts by sending a petition to King George III asking for the repeal of the Townshend Revenue Act. The House also sent the Massachusetts Circular Letter to other colonial assemblies, asking them to join the resistance movement, and called for a boycott of merchants importing the affected goods.

Lord Hillsborough had recently been appointed to the newly created office of Colonial Secretary, and he was alarmed by the actions of the Massachusetts House. In April 1768, he sent a letter to the colonial governors in America instructing them to dissolve any colonial assemblies that responded to the Massachusetts Circular Letter. He also ordered Massachusetts Governor Francis Bernard to direct the Massachusetts House to rescind the letter, but it refused to comply.

Boston's chief customs officer Charles Paxton wrote to Hillsborough for military support because "the Government is as much in the hands of the people as it was in the time of the Stamp Act." Commodore Samuel Hood responded by sending the 50-gun warship HMS Romney, which arrived in Boston Harbor in May 1768. On June 10, 1768, customs officials seized Liberty, a sloop owned by leading Boston merchant John Hancock, on allegations that the ship had been involved in smuggling. Bostonians were already angry because the captain of Romney had been impressing local sailors; they began to riot, and customs officials fled to Castle William for protection.

Daniel Calfe declares, that on Saturday evening the 3rd of March, a camp-woman, wife to James McDeed, a grenadier of the 29th, came into his father's shop, and the people talking about the affrays at the ropewalks, and blaming the soldiers for the part they had acted in it, the woman said, "the soldiers were in the right;" adding, "that before Tuesday or Wednesday night they would wet their swords or bayonets in New England people's blood."

— Excerpt from A Short Narrative, suggesting that the soldiers were contemplating violence against the colonists

Given the unstable state of affairs in Massachusetts, Hillsborough instructed General Thomas Gage, Commander-in-Chief, North America, to send "such Force as You shall think necessary to Boston", and the first of four British Army regiments began disembarking in Boston on October 1, 1768. Two regiments were removed from Boston in 1769, but the 14th and the 29th Regiments of Foot remained.

The Journal of Occurrences were an anonymous series of newspaper articles which chronicled the clashes between civilians and soldiers in Boston, feeding tensions with its sometimes exaggerated accounts, but those tensions rose markedly after Christopher Seider, "a young lad about eleven Years of Age", was killed by a customs employee on February 22, 1770. Seider's death was covered in the Boston Gazette, and his funeral was described as one of the largest of the time in Boston. The killing and subsequent media coverage inflamed tensions, with groups of colonists looking for soldiers to harass, and soldiers also looking for confrontation.

== Incident ==
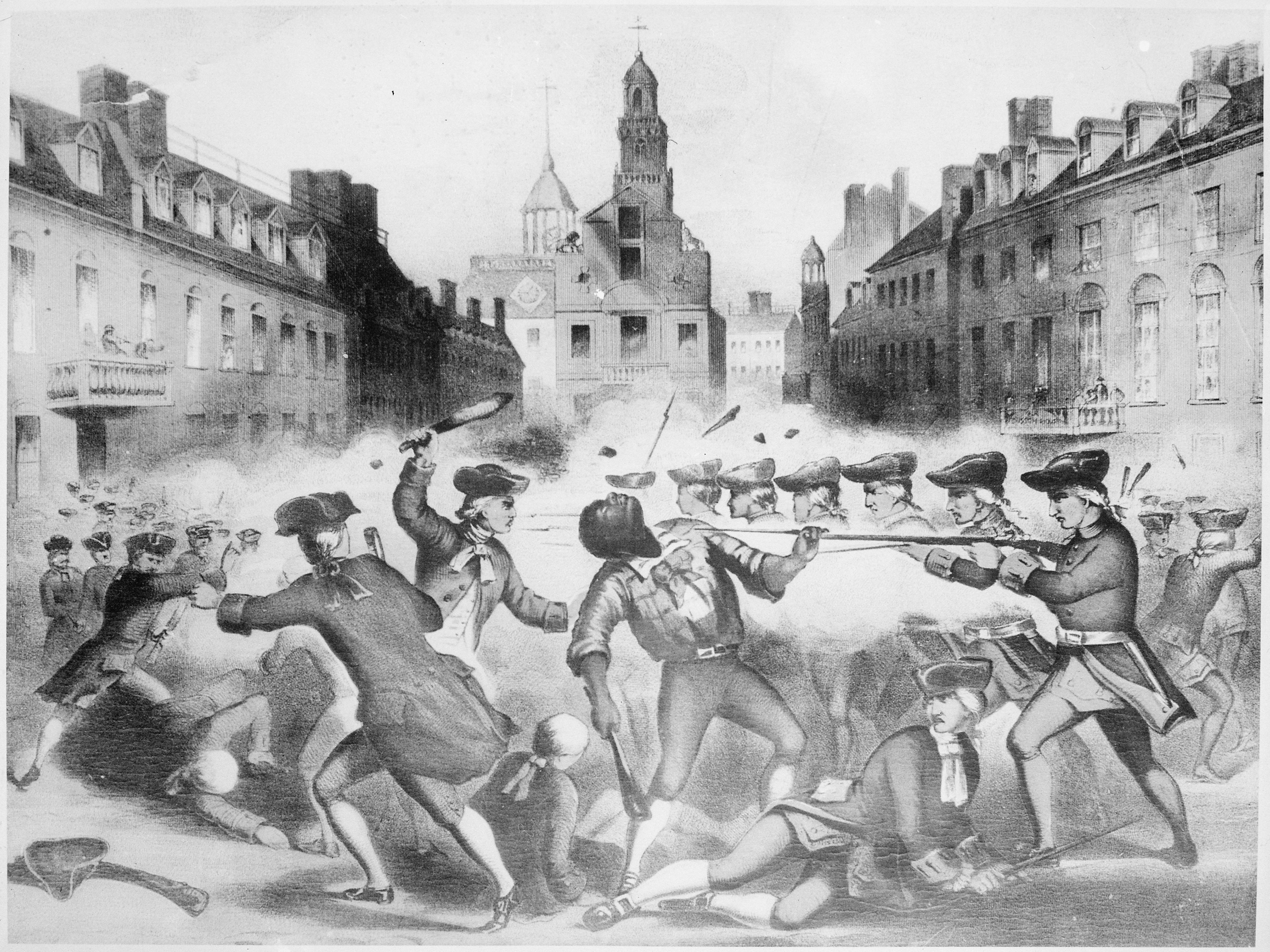
A variation of Paul Revere's famous engraving, produced just prior to the American Civil War, which emphasizes Crispus Attucks, the black man in the center who became an important symbol for abolitionists.

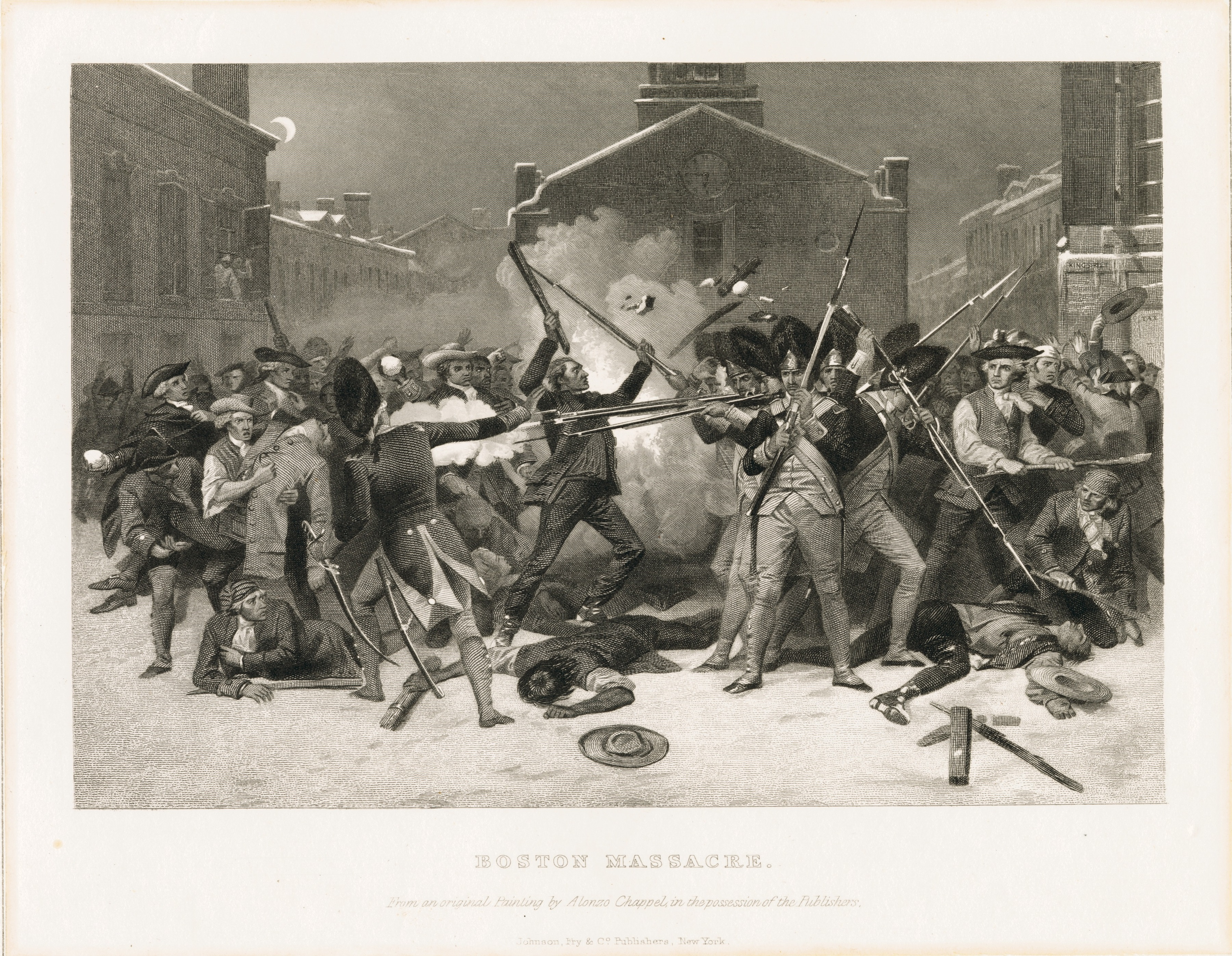
An 1868 print by Alonzo Chappel showing a more chaotic scene than most earlier representations

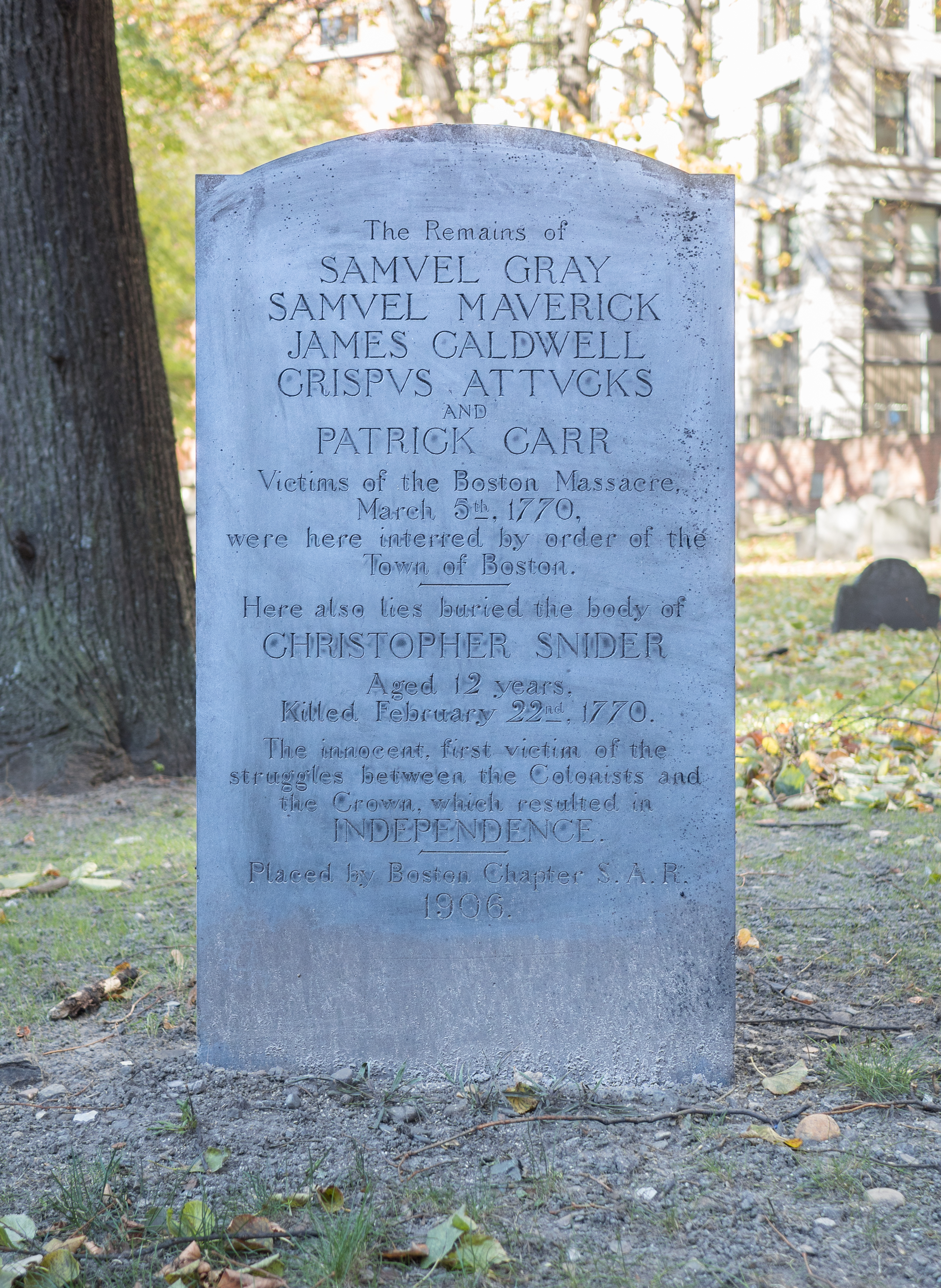
A grave marker for the Granary Burying Ground in Boston, where those killed in the Boston Massacre were buried

On the evening of March 5, 1770, Private Hugh White stood on guard duty outside the Boston Custom House on King Street (today known as State Street). A wigmaker's apprentice, approximately 13 years old, named Edward Garrick called out to Captain-Lieutenant John Goldfinch, accusing him of refusing to pay a bill due to Garrick's master. Goldfinch had settled the account the previous day, and ignored the insult. Private White called out to Garrick that he should be more respectful of the officer, and the two exchanged insults. Garrick then started poking Goldfinch in the chest with his finger; White left his post, challenged the boy, and struck him on the side of the head with his musket. Garrick cried out in pain, and his companion Bartholomew Broaders began to argue with White, which attracted a larger crowd. Henry Knox was a 19-year old bookseller who later served as a general in the revolution; he came upon the scene and warned White that, "if he fired, he must die for it."

As the evening progressed, the crowd around Private White grew larger and more boisterous. Church bells were rung, which usually signified a fire, bringing more people out. More than 50 Bostonians pressed around White, led by a mixed-race former slave named Crispus Attucks, throwing objects at the sentry and challenging him to fire his weapon. White had taken up a somewhat safer position on the steps of the Custom House, and he sought assistance. Runners alerted Captain Thomas Preston, the officer of the watch at the nearby barracks.

According to Preston's report, he dispatched a non-commissioned officer and six privates from the grenadier company of the 29th Regiment of Foot to relieve White with fixed bayonets. The soldiers were Corporal William Wemms and Privates Hugh Montgomery, John Carroll, James Hartigan, William McCauley, William Warren, and Matthew Kilroy, accompanied by Preston. They pushed their way through the crowd. Henry Knox took Preston by the coat and told him, "For God's sake, take care of your men. If they fire, you must die." Captain Preston responded "I am aware of it." When they reached Private White on the custom house stairs, the soldiers loaded their muskets and arrayed themselves in a semicircular formation. Preston shouted at the crowd, estimated between 300 and 400, to disperse.

The crowd continued to press around the soldiers, taunting them by yelling "Fire!", by spitting at them, and by throwing snowballs and other small objects. Innkeeper Richard Palmes was carrying a cudgel, and he came up to Preston and asked if the soldiers' weapons were loaded. Preston assured him that they were, but that they would not fire unless he ordered it; he later stated in his deposition that he was unlikely to do so, since he was standing in front of them. A thrown object then struck Private Montgomery, knocking him down and causing him to drop his musket. He recovered his weapon and angrily shouted "Damn you, fire!", then discharged it into the crowd although no command was given. Palmes swung his cudgel first at Montgomery, hitting his arm, and then at Preston. He narrowly missed Preston's head, striking him on the arm instead.

There was a pause of uncertain length (eyewitness estimates ranged from several seconds to two minutes), after which the soldiers fired into the crowd. It was not a disciplined volley, since Preston gave no orders to fire; the soldiers fired a ragged series of shots which hit 11 men. Three Americans died instantly: rope maker Samuel Gray, mariner James Caldwell, and Crispus Attucks. Samuel Maverick, a 17-year old apprentice ivory turner, was struck by a ricocheting musket ball at the back of the crowd and died early the next morning. Irish immigrant Patrick Carr was shot in the abdomen, an inevitably fatal wound at that time, and died two weeks later. Apprentice Christopher Monk was seriously wounded; he was crippled and died in 1780, purportedly due to the injuries that he had sustained in the attack a decade earlier.

The crowd moved away from the immediate area of the custom house but continued to grow in nearby streets. Captain Preston immediately called out most of the 29th Regiment, which adopted defensive positions in front of the state house. Acting Governor Thomas Hutchinson was summoned to the scene and was forced by the movement of the crowd into the council chamber of the state house. From its balcony, he was able to minimally restore order, promising that there would be a fair inquiry into the shootings if the crowd dispersed.

== Aftermath ==
=== Investigation ===
Hutchinson immediately began investigating the affair, and Preston and the eight soldiers were arrested by the next morning. Boston's selectmen then asked him to order the troops to move from the city out to Castle William on Castle Island, while colonists held a town meeting at Faneuil Hall to discuss the affair. The governor's council was initially opposed to ordering the troop withdrawal, and Hutchinson explained he did not have the authority to order the troops to move. Lieutenant Colonel William Dalrymple was the commander of the troops, and he did not offer to move them. The town meeting became more restive when it learned of this; the council changed its position and unanimously ("under duress", according to Hutchinson's report) agreed to request the troops' removal. Secretary of State Andrew Oliver reported that, had the troops not been removed, "they would probably be destroyed by the people—should it be called rebellion, should it incur the loss of our charter, or be the consequence what it would." The 14th was transferred to Castle Island without incident about a week later, with the 29th following shortly after, leaving the governor without effective means to police the town. The first four victims were buried with ceremony on March 8 in the Granary Burying Ground, one of Boston's oldest burial grounds. Patrick Carr, the fifth and final victim, died on March 14 and was buried with them on March 17.

Mr. John Gillespie, in his deposition, (No. 104) declares that, as he was going to the south end of the town, to meet some friends at a public house, he met several people in the streets in parties, to the number, as he thinks, of forty or fifty persons; and that while he was sitting with his friends there, several persons of his acquaintance came in to them at different times, and took notice of the numbers of persons they had seen in the street armed in the above manner [with clubs].… About half an hour after eight the bells rung, which [Gillespie] and his company took to be for fire; but they were told by the landlord of the house that it was to collect the mob. Mr. Gillespie upon this resolved to go home, and in his way met numbers of people who were running past him, of whom many were armed with clubs and sticks, and some with other weapons. At the same time a number of people passed by him with two fire-engines, as if there had been a fire in the town. But they were soon told that there was no fire, but that the people were going to fight the soldiers, upon which they immediately quitted the fire-engines, and swore they would go to their assistance. All this happened before the soldiers near the custom-house fired their muskets, which was not till half an hour after nine o'clock; and it [shows] that the inhabitants had formed, and were preparing to execute, a design of attacking the soldiers on that evening.

— Excerpt from A Fair Account, suggesting that the colonists planned the attack on the soldiers

On March 27, the eight soldiers, Captain Preston, and four civilians were indicted for murder; the civilians were in the Customs House and were alleged to have fired shots. Bostonians continued to be hostile to the troops and their dependents. General Gage was convinced that the troops were doing more harm than good, so he ordered the 29th Regiment out of the province in May. Governor Hutchinson took advantage of the on-going high tensions to orchestrate delays of the trials until later in the year.

=== Media battle ===
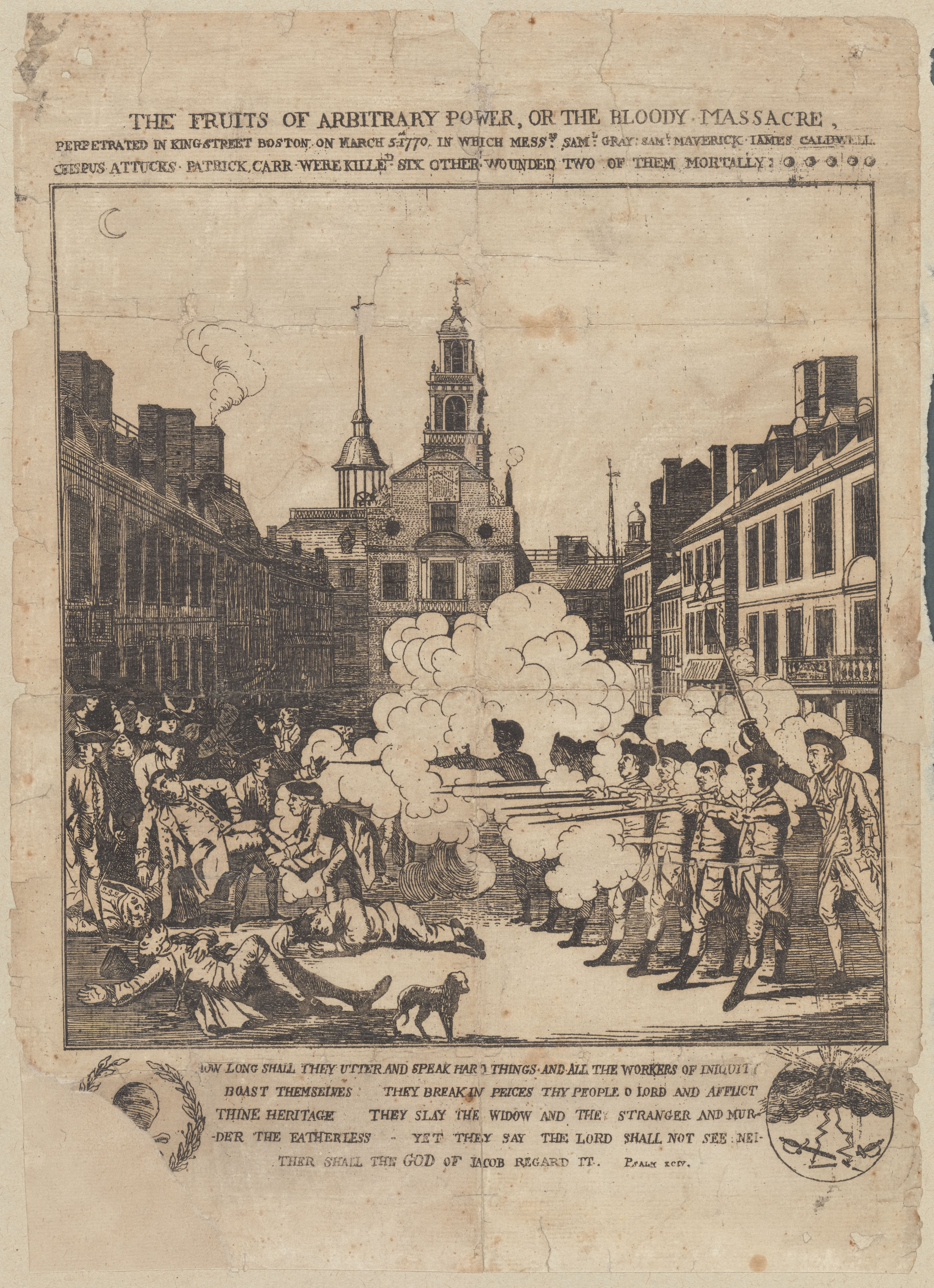
Henry Pelham's original engraving, The Bloody Massacre, depicting the Boston Massacre

In the days and weeks following the incident, a propaganda battle was waged between Patriots and Loyalists in Boston. Both sides published pamphlets that told strikingly different stories, and which were principally published in London in a bid to influence opinion there. The Boston Gazette's version of events, for example, characterized the massacre as part of an ongoing scheme to "quell a Spirit of Liberty", and harped on the negative consequences of quartering troops in the city.

Henry Pelham, an engraver and half-brother of celebrated portrait painter John Singleton Copley, depicted the event in an engraving. Silversmith and engraver Paul Revere copied the image and is often credited as its originator. The engraving contained several inflammatory details. Captain Preston is shown ordering his men to fire, and a musket is seen shooting out of the window of the customs office, which is labeled "Butcher's Hall". Artist Christian Remick hand-colored some prints. Some copies of the print show a man with two chest wounds and a somewhat darker face, matching descriptions of Attucks; others show no black victim. The image was published in the Boston Gazette and circulated widely, and it became an effective anti-British editorial. The image of soldiers in red uniforms and wounded men with red blood was hung in farmhouses throughout New England.

Anonymous pamphlets were published describing the event from significantly different perspectives. A Short Narrative of the Horrid Massacre was published under the auspices of the Boston town meeting, principally written by James Bowdoin, a member of the governor's council and a vocal opponent of British colonial policy, along with Samuel Pemberton and Joseph Warren. It described the shooting and other lesser incidents that took place in the days before as unprovoked attacks on peaceful, law-abiding inhabitants and, according to historian Neal Langley York, was probably the most influential description of the event. The account which it provided was drawn from more than 90 depositions taken after the event, and it included accusations that the soldiers sent by Captain Preston had been deployed with the intention of causing harm. In the interest of minimizing impact on the jury pool, city leaders held back local distribution of the pamphlet, but they sent copies to other colonies and to London, where they knew that depositions were headed which Governor Hutchinson had collected. A second pamphlet entitled Additional Observations on the Short Narrative furthered the attack on crown officials by complaining that customs officials were abandoning their posts under the pretense that it was too dangerous for them to do their duties; one customs official had left Boston to carry Hutchinson's gathered depositions to London.

Hutchinson's depositions were eventually published in a pamphlet entitled A Fair Account of the Late Unhappy Disturbance in Boston, drawn mainly from the depositions of soldiers. Its account of affairs sought to blame Bostonians for denying the validity of Parliamentary laws. It also blamed the city's citizens for the lawlessness preceding the event, and claimed that they set up an ambush of the soldiers. As it was not published until well after the first pamphlet had arrived in London, it had a much smaller impact on the public debate there.

=== Trials ===
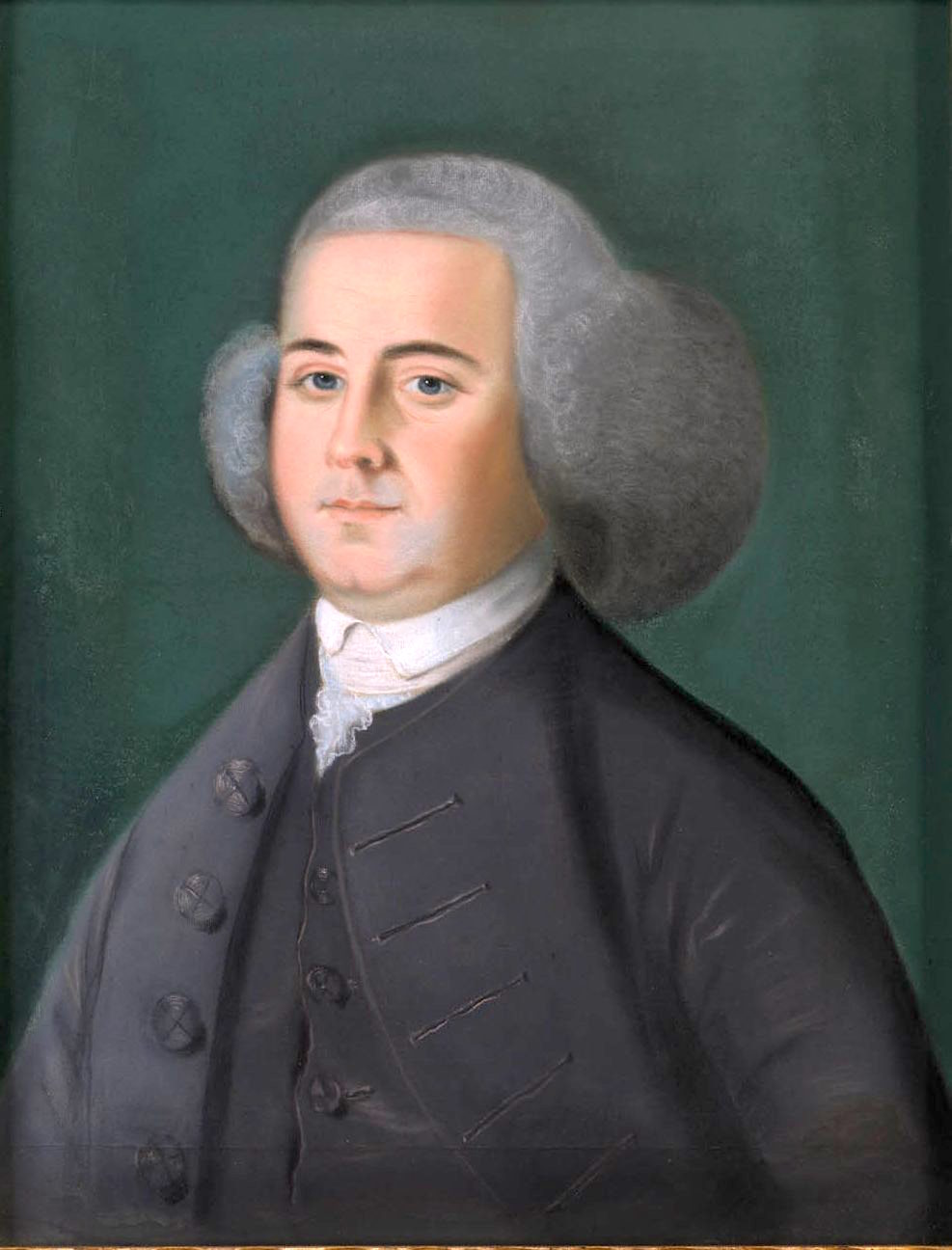
John Adams, who later became the second President of the United States, defended the soldiers, six of whom were acquitted.

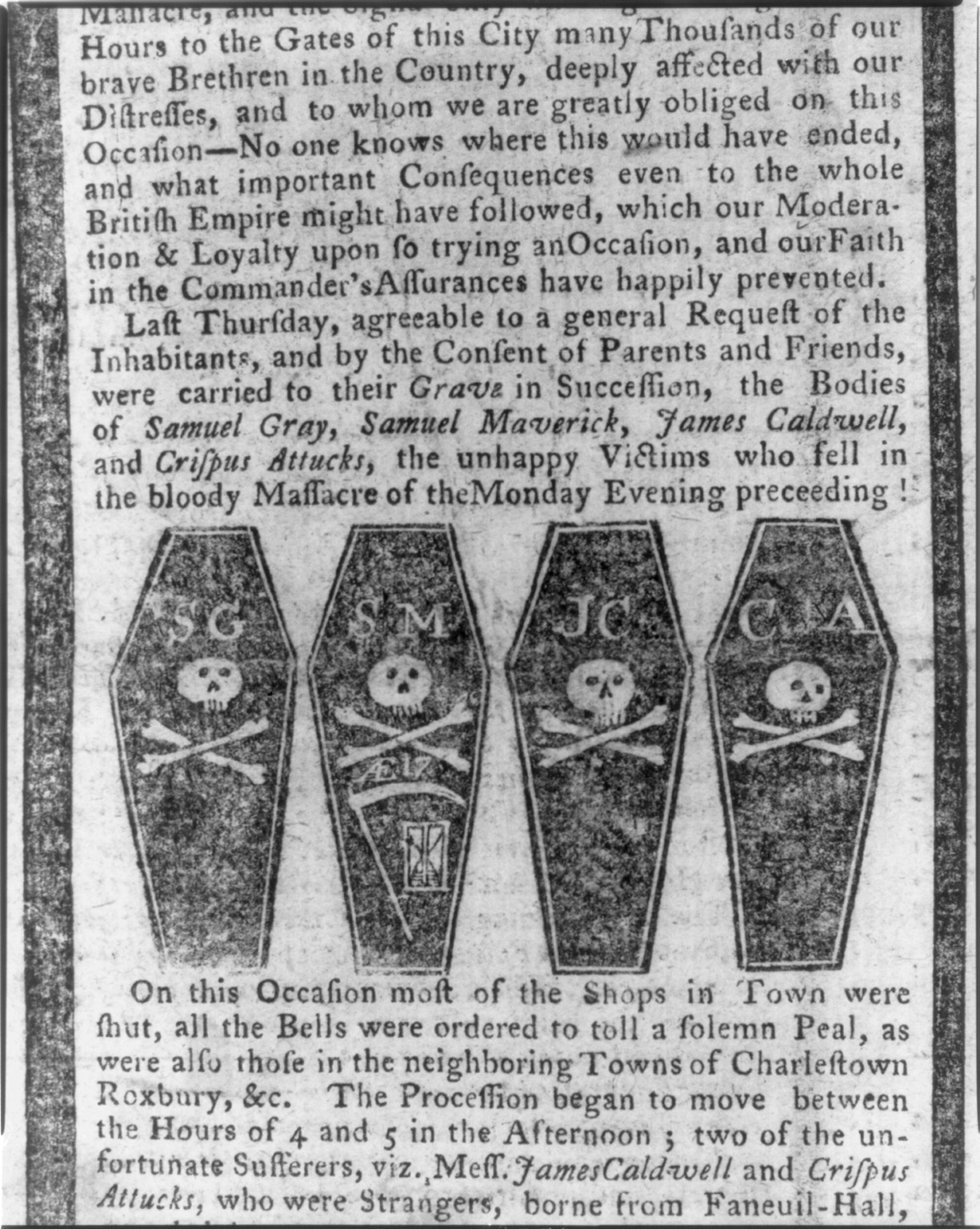
The March 12, 1770 newspaper report in the Boston Gazette, four days after the funeral; the illustration of the coffins depicts the initials of the four victims buried that day.

The Part I took in Defence of Cptn. Preston and the Soldiers, procured me Anxiety, and Obloquy enough. It was, however, one of the most gallant, generous, manly and disinterested Actions of my whole Life, and one of the best Pieces of Service I ever rendered my Country. Judgment of Death against those Soldiers would have been as foul a Stain upon this Country as the Executions of the Quakers or Witches, anciently. As the Evidence was, the Verdict of the Jury was exactly right. This however is no Reason why the Town should not call the Action of that Night a Massacre, nor is it any Argument in favour of the Governor or Minister, who caused them to be sent here. But it is the strongest Proofs of the Danger of Standing Armies.

— John Adams, on the third anniversary of the massacre

The government was determined to give the soldiers a fair trial so that there could be no grounds for retaliation from the British and so that moderates would not be alienated from the Patriot cause. On behalf of Thomas Preston, who was tried separately from his soldiers, Loyalist merchant James Forrest sent a request to John Adams pleading for him to work on the case because he had difficulty finding a lawyer among anti-British sentiments. Adams was already a leading Patriot and was contemplating a run for public office, but he agreed to help in the interest of ensuring a fair trial even with risk to his reputation. He was joined by Josiah Quincy II after Quincy was assured that the Sons of Liberty would not oppose his appointment, and by Loyalist Robert Auchmuty. They were assisted by Sampson Salter Blowers, whose chief duty was to investigate the jury pool, and by Paul Revere, who drew a detailed map of the bodies to be used in the trial. Future Massachusetts Solicitor General Samuel Quincy and private attorney Robert Treat Paine were hired by the town of Boston to handle the prosecution. The defense team believed it was advantageous for Preston and the enlisted men to be tried separately and obtained such a separation. Preston was tried in late October 1770 and acquitted after the jury was convinced that he had not ordered the troops to fire.

The trial of the eight other soldiers opened on November 27, 1770. Adams told the jury to look beyond the fact that the soldiers were British. He referred to the crowd that had provoked the soldiers as "a motley rabble of saucy boys, negroes, and molattoes, Irish teagues and outlandish Jack Tarrs" (sailors). He then stated, "And why we should scruple to call such a set of people a mob, I can't conceive, unless the name is too respectable for them. The sun is not about to stand still or go out, nor the rivers to dry up because there was a mob in Boston on the 5th of March that attacked a party of soldiers."

Adams also described the former slave Crispus Attucks, saying "his very look was enough to terrify any person" and that "with one hand [he] took hold of a bayonet, and with the other knocked the man down." However, two witnesses contradict this statement, testifying that Attucks was 12–15 feet (3.7–4.6 m) away from the soldiers when they began firing, too far away to take hold of a bayonet. Adams stated that it was Attucks's behavior that, "in all probability, the dreadful carnage of that night is chiefly to be ascribed." He argued that the soldiers had the legal right to fight back against the mob and so were innocent. If they were provoked but not endangered, he argued, they were at most guilty of manslaughter.

The jury agreed with Adams's arguments and acquitted six of the soldiers after 2 1/2 hours of deliberation. Two of the soldiers were found guilty of manslaughter because there was overwhelming evidence that they had fired directly into the crowd. The jury's decisions suggest that they believed that the soldiers had felt threatened by the crowd but should have delayed firing. The convicted soldiers pled benefit of clergy, the right to a lesser sentence for a first offender. This reduced their punishment from a death sentence to branding of the thumb in open court.

Patrick Carr's deathbed account of the event also played a role in exonerating the eight defendants of murder charges. The testimony of John Jeffries is reprinted below:

Q: Were you Patrick Carr's surgeon?
A: I was.
Q: Was he [Carr] apprehensive of his danger?
A: He told me... he was a native of Ireland, that he had frequently seen mobs, and soldiers called upon to quell them... he had seen soldiers often fire on the people in Ireland, but had never seen them bear half so much before they fired in his life.
Q: When had you the last conversation with him?
A: About four o'clock in the afternoon, preceding the night on which he died, and he then particularly said, he forgave the man whoever he was that shot him, he was satisfied he had no malice, but fired to defend himself.

Justices Edmund Trowbridge and Peter Oliver instructed the jury, and Oliver specifically addressed Carr's testimony: "this Carr was not upon oath, it is true, but you will determine whether a man just stepping into eternity is not to be believed, especially in favor of a set of men by whom he had lost his life". Carr's testimony is one of the earliest recorded uses of the dying declaration exception to the inadmissibility of hearsay evidence in United States legal code.

The four civilians were tried on December 13. The principal prosecution witness was a servant of one of the accused who made claims that were easily rebutted by defense witnesses. They were all acquitted, and the servant was eventually convicted of perjury, whipped, and banished from the province.

== Legacy ==
=== Contribution to American Revolution ===
The Boston Massacre is considered one of the most significant events that turned colonial sentiment against King George III and British Parliamentary authority. John Adams wrote that the "foundation of American independence was laid" on March 5, 1770, and Samuel Adams and other Patriots used annual commemorations (Massacre Day) to encourage public sentiment toward independence. Christopher Monk was the boy who was wounded in the attack and died in 1780, and his memory was honored as a reminder of British hostility.

Later events such as the Gaspee Affair and the Boston Tea Party further illustrated the crumbling relationship between Great Britain and its colonies. Five years passed between the massacre and outright war, and Neil York suggests that there is only a tenuous connection between the two. It is widely perceived as a significant event leading to the violent rebellion that followed. Howard Zinn argues that Boston was full of "class anger". He reports that the Boston Gazette published in 1763 that "a few persons in power" were promoting political projects "for keeping the people poor in order to make them humble."

=== Commemorations ===
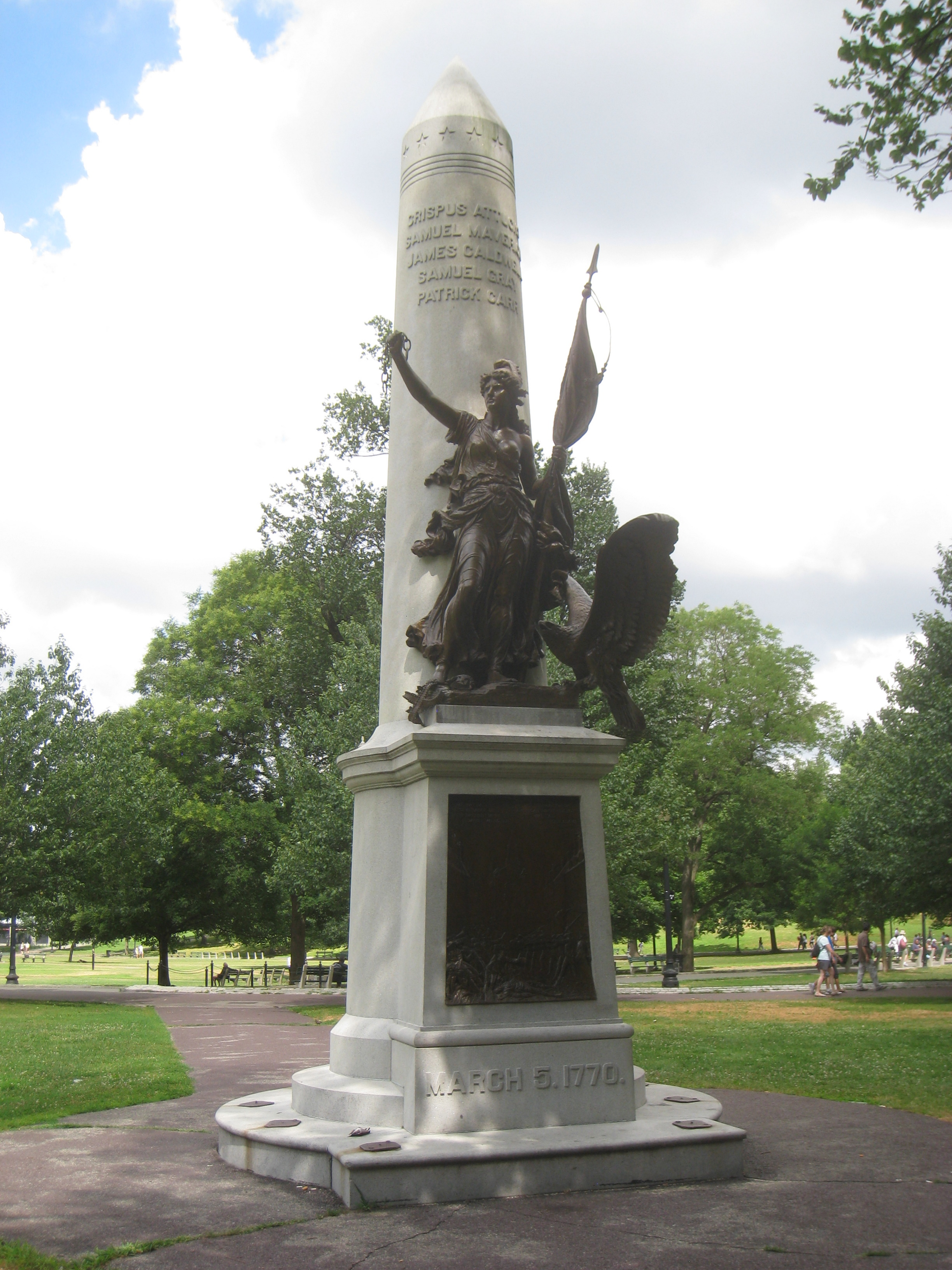
The Boston Massacre Monument, built by Adolph Robert Kraus, on display in Boston Common since 1889

The massacre was remembered in 1858 in a celebration organized by William Cooper Nell, a black abolitionist who saw the death of Crispus Attucks as an opportunity to demonstrate the role of African Americans in the Revolutionary War. Artwork was produced commemorating the massacre, changing the color of a victim's skin to black to emphasize Attucks' death. In 1888, the Boston Massacre Monument was erected on the Boston Common in memory of the men killed in the massacre, and the five victims were reinterred in a prominent grave in the Granary Burying Ground.

The massacre is reenacted annually on March 5 under the auspices of the Bostonian Society. The Old State House, the massacre site, and the Granary Burying Ground are part of Boston's Freedom Trail, connecting sites important in the city's history.

== See also ==
- List of massacres in the United States
- Timeline of United States revolutionary history (1760–1789)

== Sources ==
- A Fair Account of the Late Unhappy Disturbance at Boston. London: B. White. 1770. p. 3. OCLC 535966548. Original printing of a reply to "A Short Narrative…", supplying several depositions, including that of Lieutenant-Governor Hutchinson, which were left out of the Narrative.
- A Short Narrative of the Horrid Massacre. London: W. Bingley. 1770. OCLC 510892519. Original printing of the report of a committee of the town of Boston.
- Adams, John (1962). Butterfield, L.H. (ed.). Diary and Autobiography of John Adams, vol. 2. Cambridge, MA: The Belknap Press of Harvard University Press. OCLC 19993300.
- Allison, Robert J. (2006). The Boston Massacre. Beverly, MA: Applewood Books. ISBN 978-1-933212-10-4. OCLC 66392877.
- Antal, John (2013). 7 Leadership Lessons of the American Revolution: The Founding Fathers, Liberty, and the Struggle for Independence. Casemate. ISBN 9781612002033.
- Archer, Richard (2010). As if an Enemy's Country: the British Occupation of Boston and the Origins of Revolution. Oxford, NY: Oxford University Press. ISBN 978-0-19-538247-1. OCLC 313664751.
- Bailyn, Bernard (1974). The Ordeal of Thomas Hutchinson. Cambridge, MA: Harvard University Press. ISBN 978-0-674-64160-0. OCLC 6825524.
- Cumming, William P.; Rankin, Hugh F. (1975). The Fate of a Nation: The American Revolution Through Contemporary Eyes. New York: Phaidon Press. ISBN 978-0-7148-1644-9. OCLC 1510269.
- Fischer, David Hackett (1994). Paul Revere's Ride. New York: Oxford University Press. ISBN 978-0-19-508847-2. OCLC 263430392.
- Knollenberg, Bernhard (1975). Growth of the American Revolution, 1766–1775. New York: Free Press. ISBN 978-0-02-917110-3. OCLC 1416300.
- Middlekauff, Robert (2007). The Glorious Cause: The American Revolution, 1763–1789. New York and Oxford: Oxford University Press. ISBN 978-0-19-516247-9. OCLC 496757346.
- Miller, John (1959). Origins of the American Revolution. Stanford, CA: Stanford University Press. ISBN 9780804705936. OCLC 180556929.
- Nell, William Cooper; Wesley, Dorothy Porter; Uzelac, Constance Porter (2002). William Cooper Nell, Nineteenth-Century African American Abolitionist, Historian, Integrationist: Selected Writings from 1832–1874. Baltimore, MD: Black Classic Press. ISBN 978-1-57478-019-2. OCLC 50673509.
- O'Connor, Thomas H (2001). The Hub: Boston Past and Present. Boston: Northeastern University Press. ISBN 978-1-55553-474-5. OCLC 248309644.
- Ross, Betsy McCaughey; McCaughey, Elizabeth P. (1980). From Loyalist to Founding Father: the Political Odyssey of William Samuel Johnson. New York: Columbia University Press. ISBN 978-0-231-04506-3. OCLC 479827879.
- Triber, Jayne (1998). A True Republican: The Life of Paul Revere. Amherst, MA: University of Massachusetts Press. ISBN 978-1-55849-139-7. OCLC 171052850.
- Walett, Francis (September 1950). "James Bowdoin, Patriot Propagandist". The New England Quarterly. 23 (3): 320–338. doi:10.2307/361420. JSTOR 361420.
- Wheeler, William Bruce; Becker, Susan Becker; Glover, Lorri (2011). Discovering the American Past: A Look at the Evidence: To 1877. Belmont, CA: Cengage Learning. ISBN 978-0-495-79984-9. OCLC 664324291.
- Woods, Thomas (2008). Exploring American History: From Colonial Times to 1877. New York: Associated University Press. ISBN 978-0-7614-7746-4. OCLC 302384920.
- York, Neil Longley (2009). "Rival Truths, Political Accommodation, and the Boston 'Massacre'". Massachusetts Historical Review. 11: 57–95. JSTOR 40345980.
- York, Neil Longley (2010). The Boston Massacre: a History with Documents. New York: Taylor & Francis. ISBN 978-0-415-87348-2. OCLC 695944958.
- Young, Alfred (Spring 2003). "Revolution in Boston? Eight Propositions for Public History on the Freedom Trail" (PDF). The Public Historian. 25 (2): 17–41. doi:10.1525/tph.2003.25.2.17.
- Zinn, Howard (1980). A People's History of the United States. New York: HarperCollins. ISBN 978-0-06-019448-2. OCLC 42420960.
- Zobel, Hiller B (1970). The Boston Massacre. New York: W.W. Norton & Company. ISBN 978-0-393-31483-0. OCLC 243696768.

Preceded by Old State House	Locations along Boston's Freedom Trail; Site of the Boston Massacre	Succeeded by Faneuil Hall
