= Christopher Seider =

First American killed in the American Revolution

Christopher Seider (or Snider) (1758 – February 22, 1770) was a boy who is considered to be the first American killed in the American Revolution. He was 11 years old when he was shot and killed by British customs officer Ebenezer Richardson in Boston on February 22, 1770. His funeral became a major political event, with his death heightening tensions that erupted into the Boston Massacre on March 5, 1770.

== Life ==
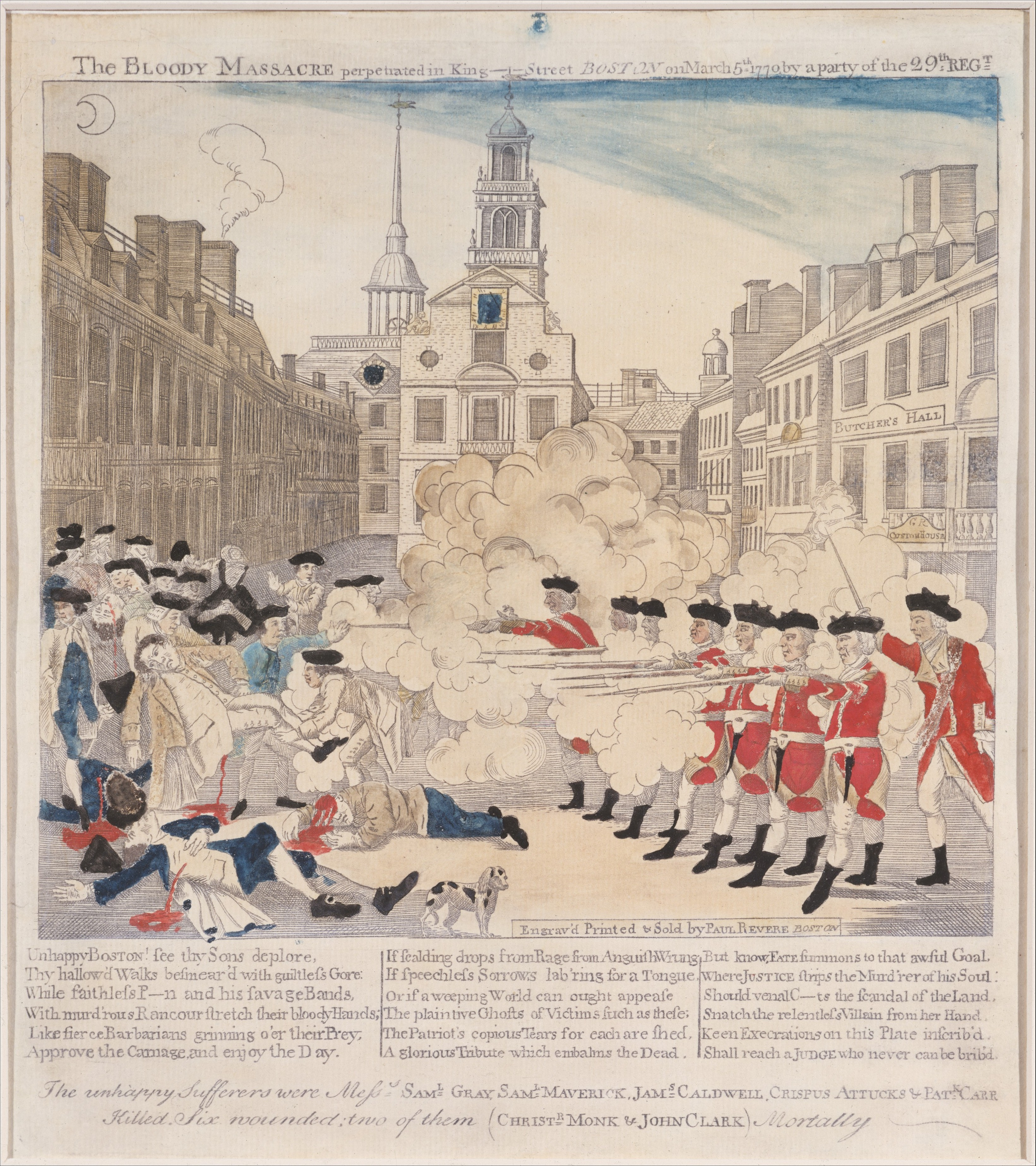
The Bloody Massacre, Paul Revere's engraving of The Boston Massacre of March 1770. In the background on the right, the Customs House has been renamed "Butcher's Hall" and a gun can be seen firing from a window, an oblique reference to Seider's death.

Seider was born in 1758, the son of poor German immigrants. On February 22, 1770, he joined a crowd outside the house of Ebenezer Richardson in the North End. Richardson was a customs officer who had tried to disperse a protest in front of the shop of Loyalist Theophilus Lillie. The crowd threw stones that broke Lillie's windows and struck his wife. Richardson fired a musket into the crowd and wounded Seider in the arm and the chest. The boy died that evening.

Samuel Adams arranged for the funeral, which was attended by more than 2,000 people. Seider was buried in Granary Burying Ground, and the victims of the Boston Massacre are buried nearby.

Seider's killing and large public funeral fueled public outrage, which reached a peak in the Boston Massacre 11 days later. Richardson was convicted of murder that spring but received a royal pardon and a new position within the customs service on the grounds that he had acted in self-defense. This became a major American grievance against the British government.

== In popular culture ==
Christopher's death, his funeral, and the subsequent Boston Massacre are featured in the 2015 television miniseries Sons of Liberty and season 2 of the 2016 television docuseries Legends & Lies: The Patriots.
