= Matthew Kilroy (British Army soldier) =

Irish soldier

- Born: 1748 (approximate); Mountmellick, Ireland
- Occupation: Soldier
- Convictions: Manslaughter (5 December 1770)
- Penalty: Branded on the thumb

Details
- Victims: Samuel Gray
- Date: 5 March 1770
- Locations: Boston, Massachusetts
- Weapon: Flintlock muskets

Matthew Kilroy (fl. 1770) was an Irish soldier who served in the 29th Regiment of Foot and was present at the Boston Massacre, for which he was found guilty of the manslaughter of one of the five fatalities, Samuel Gray.

== Early life ==
Kilroy was born in Mountmellick, Ireland. A laborer without a skilled trade, he joined the 29th Regiment of Foot at age 15, and sometime before March 1770, joined their grenadier company.

== Boston Massacre ==
On 5 March 1770, seven soldiers from the 29th Regiment of Foot, including Kilroy, were dispatched to King Street in Boston, Massachusetts to relieve Private Hugh White. A large crowd soon gathered around them. After Private Hugh Montgomery was struck by a club, Montgomery shouted, "Damn you, fire!" Kilroy then pointed his gun at rope-maker Samuel Gray, who, depending on the source, said, "damn you, don't fire!" or "They dare not fire."

Kilroy then fired the shot that killed Gray. The ball passed through Gray's head and "opened up a hole as big as a man's fist." Several witnesses said that, afterwards, Kilroy's bayonet was covered with blood. A few days before the massacre, Kilroy had argued with Gray at Gray's Rope-works. One witness alleged that Kilroy had also said that "he would never miss an opportunity... to fire on the inhabitants." When pressed, the witness could not recall if it was said in jest, in anger, or in what context the words were spoken.

On 27 March, Kilroy was indicted for murder. He was held in prison pending trial, which took place in November and December 1770, in Boston. John Adams, who would later become President of the United States, was his attorney. Kilroy and Montgomery were both found guilty of manslaughter on 5 December. They returned to court nine days later and pleaded "benefit of clergy" to avoid the death sentence. Instead, they were branded on the thumb, with a hot iron, the letter "M" for manslaughter. The two reportedly burst into tears before receiving the punishment.

After the trial, Kilroy rejoined his regiment in New Jersey before returning to England. In 1776, the 29th was ordered back to America to join the war, putting Kilroy and Montgomery at risk of capture and recognition. On February 22, Kilroy and Montgomery appeared before the pension board in Chelsea. Although only 28, Kilroy was cited as having a "lame knee," and both were discharged and granted pensions.

Kilroy was illiterate. He is featured as a main character in the book The Fifth of March by author Ann Rinaldi.
