= St. Mary's by the Sea =

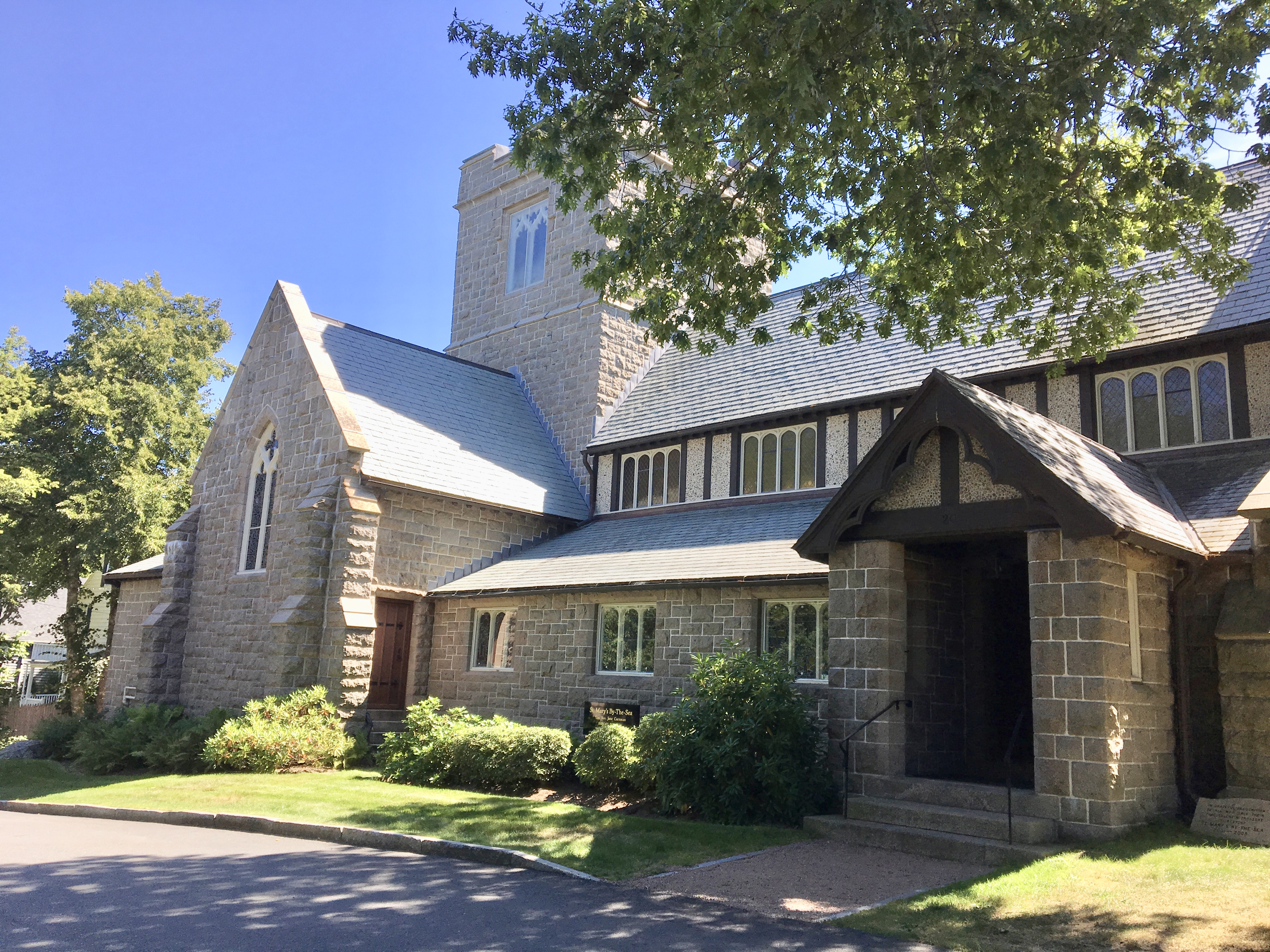
St. Mary's-by-the-Sea is located at 20 S. Shore Road in Northeast Harbor, Maine

St. Mary's by the Sea or variations such as St. Mary's-by-the-Sea may refer to:

in the United States (by state)

- St. Mary's by the Sea, a residential walkway along Long Island Sound in Black Rock Harbor, Connecticut
- St. Mary's-by-the-Sea, a Shingle-style house in Fenwick Historic District, Fenwick, Connecticut
- St. Mary's-By-The-Sea (Northeast Harbor, Maine), listed on the National Register of Historic Places (NRHP) in Maine
