= Abijah Gilbert =

American politician (1806–1881)

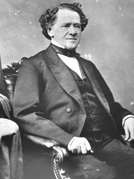

United States Senator from Florida
- In office March 4, 1869 – March 3, 1875
- Preceded by: Adonijah Welch
- Succeeded by: Charles W. Jones

Personal details
- Born: June 18, 1806 Gilbertsville, New York, U.S.
- Died: November 23, 1881 (aged 75) Gilbertsville, New York, U.S.
- Resting place: Brookside Cemetery in Gilbertsville
- Party: Republican

Abijah Gilbert (June 18, 1806 – November 23, 1881) was an American politician who served one term as a United States senator from Florida, from 1869 to 1875.

== Early life and career ==
Born in Gilbertsville, New York, Gilbert attended Gilbertsville Academy and entered Hamilton College (in Clinton, New York) in 1822, as a member of the class of 1826, but did not return the following year.

He spent the years, 1822 to 1850, engaged in mercantile pursuits in New York City before moving to St. Augustine, Florida in 1865.

== Political career ==
An early advocate of abolitionism, Gilbert was a strong supporter of the Whig Party and, later on, the Republican Party.

=== U.S. Senate ===
He was elected to represent Florida in the United States Senate as a Republican, and served from 1869 to 1875, as part of the Reconstruction effort. During that period of time, he missed 40.4% of roll call votes.

== Later career and death ==
Gilbert retired from business and political life after his Senate term ended while continuing to live in St. Augustine. He moved back to Gilbertsville shortly before his death in 1881. He is buried in Brookside Cemetery, Gilbertsville.

== See also ==
- List of United States senators from Florida
- Florida's congressional delegations

U.S. Senate
Preceded by Adonijah S. Welch	U.S. senator (Class 1) from Florida; 1869–1875; Served alongside: Thomas W. Osborn and Simon B. Conover	Succeeded by Charles W. Jones
