= Carl Fehmer =

American architect

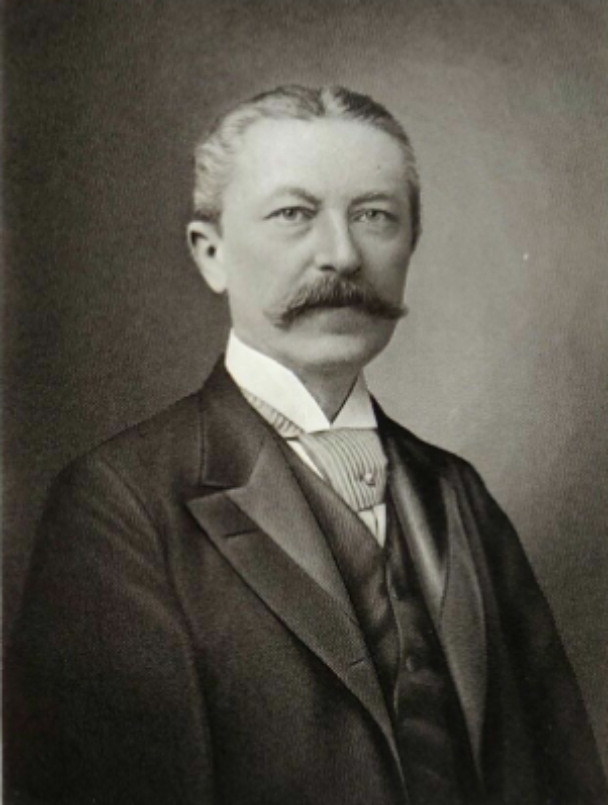
- Steel engraving c. 1916
- Born: November 10, 1838; Dargun, Mecklenburg, Germany
- Died: 1923 (aged 84–85); Boston, Massachusetts, United States
- Spouse: Therese Wahl (m. 1872–1914)
- Military career
- Allegiance: Union (American Civil War)
- Branch: Fourth Battalion

Signature
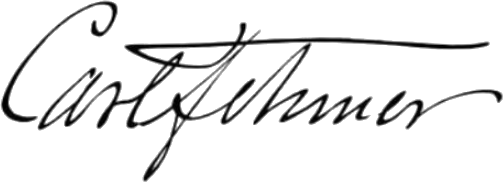

Carl Fehmer (November 10, 1838 – 1923) was a prominent German-American Boston architect during the 19th century.

Fehmer had already started his architectural career before his service in the Civil War, but became well-established afterward. With two key partnerships (with William Ralph Emerson from 1867 to 1873, and with Samuel Francis Page from 1882 to 1908), Fehmer designed a long list of residences in the Back Bay, department stores, major civic buildings, and landmarks such as the Boylston Building. All but a few of his designs are in Boston.

== Life and career ==
Fehmer was born in Dargun, Mecklenburg, Germany, on November 10, 1838, to Heinrich Fehmer and Maria (Zerrahn) Fehmer. His father died in Germany when he was five; the mother and children came to America in 1852 and settled in Boston.

Fehmer attended public school in Boston, and showed an early aptitude for drawing and painting. At the age of 16 he began studying architecture in the office of George Snell, a prominent Boston architect. Fehmer remained in Snell's office for eight years before beginning his own architectural practice. In 1861 Fehmer was associated with architects Gridley James Fox Bryant and Arthur Gilman, at least to the extent of producing their presentation drawing of their 1862-65 Boston City Hall, one of the first Second Empire buildings in the country.

During the Civil War, Fehmer served in the militia at Fort Independence as a member of the "New England Guards" Fourth Battalion under Major Thomas Stevenson.

After the war, Fehmer returned to practice under a short-lived partnership with Thomas E. Coburn from 1865 to 1867. He then partnered with William Ralph Emerson, which lasted from 1867 to 1874.

Fehmer's fortunes improved along with his good personal relationship with the Boston benefactor Oliver Ames. In 1882 Fehmer designed his palatial showpiece Ames Residence, at Massachusetts and Commonwealth Avenue. The plan included a drawing room with furnishings and decorations by the Herter Brothers dating to 1883, the last of that firm's great commissions. A later account ("Costliest in the City") describes Ames and Fehmer decorating it with a summer buying trip through Europe. Ames was lieutenant governor at the time. When Ames became governor, Fehmer received a consulting role over the expansion of the Massachusetts State House beginning in 1889, then was also awarded the commission for the Oliver Ames High School in Easton, funded by the governor.

Also in 1882 Fehmer formed a third partnership, with Samuel Francis Page, which lasted until Fehmer's own retirement in 1908. The office continued to innovate, and even help bring Boston into the skyscraper era: Fehmer & Page's Worthington Building in 1894 was one of the first steel-framed office buildings in the city.

On April 20, 1872, he married Therese Wahl, who died in 1914. Fehmer was a charter member of the Boston Society of Architects and the St. Botolph Club. Fehmer retired to Kingston, New York, where he died in 1923.

== Work ==
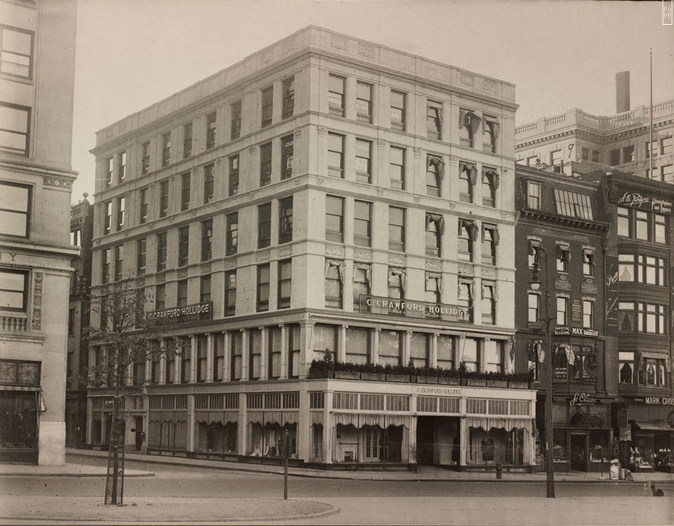
Retailer C. Crawford Hollidge Building, Boston, 1890

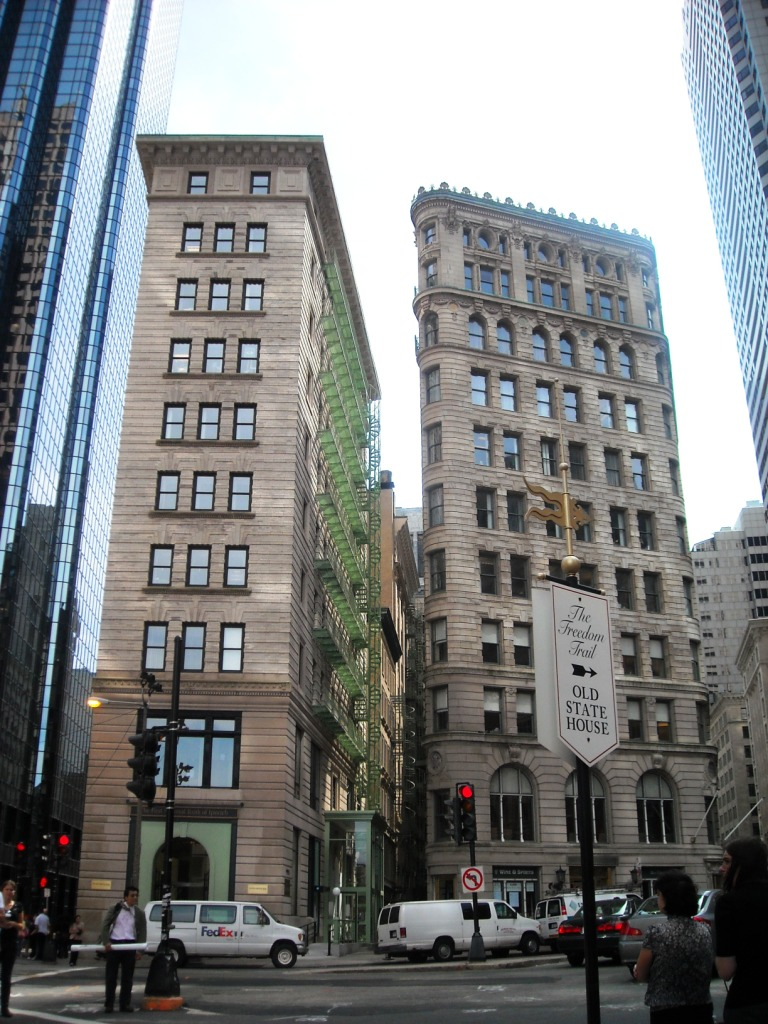
Fehmer & Page's Worthington Building of 1894 at left; Cass Gilbert's Second Brazer Building of 1897 at right

Several of his works are listed on the National Register of Historic Places.

Fehmer's works include:

- William King Covell III House, 72 Washington Street, Newport, Rhode Island, NRHP-listed, 1870 (Fehmer & Emerson)
- St. Mark's Episcopal Church, Wilmington, North Carolina, 1871-1875 (Fehmer & Emerson)
- 1 Winthrop Square, Boston, 1873 (Fehmer & Emerson)
- the third Tremont Temple, Boston, 1880 (Fehmer solo; building replaced by the fourth Temple in 1896)
- Governor Oliver Ames Residence, 355 Commonwealth Ave., Boston, 1882 (Fehmer solo)
- original Walker Memorial Building, Campus of the Massachusetts Institute of Technology, Cambridge, 1886 (Fehmer solo; razed 1939)
- the Warren Theater, 270 Warren Street, Roxbury, 1886 (Fehmer solo)
- Boylston Building, 2-22 Boylston Street, Boston, NRHP-listed, 1887 (Fehmer solo)
- consulting architect for expansions of the Massachusetts State House, Boston, 1889 (Fehmer solo)
- Boston Massacre Monument, Boston Common, with sculptor Adolph Robert Kraus, 1889
- base of Randidge Monument, Forest Hills Cemetery, Boston, with sculptor Adolph Robert Kraus, 1891
- Beaconsfield Terraces Historic District, 11-25, 33-43, and 44-55 Garrison Rd. and 316-326, 332-344, and 350-366 Tappan St., Brookline, NRHP-listed, between 1889 and 1892 (Fehmer & Page)
- C. Crawford Hollidge Building, Boston, 1890 (Fehmer & Page; razed 1967)
- Bell Telephone Building, Milk Street, Boston, 1892 (Fehmer & Page; razed 1972)
- Worthington Building, 33 State Street, Boston, 1894 (Fehmer & Page)
- Oliver Ames High School, Easton, 1896 (Fehmer & Page)
- Hotel Beaconsfield, Brookline, 1903-1905 (Fehmer & Page)
- work for the Massachusetts General Hospital
- buildings for the McLean Asylum in Waverly
