= Tianderah =

Historic house in New York, United States

- U.S. National Register of Historic Places
- Location within New York Location within the United States
- Location: Off NY 51, Gilbertsville, New York
- Coordinates: 42°27′50″N 75°18′54″W
- Area: 33 acres (13 ha)
- Built: 1885
- Architect: Emerson, William Ralph
- Architectural style: Shingle style, Romanesque Revival
- NRHP reference No.: 78001894
- Added to NRHP: November 2, 1978

Tianderah is a historic home located at Gilbertsville in Otsego County, New York. It was built in 1887 by Boston-based architect William Ralph Emerson. It is an L-shaped, stone Romanesque Revival and Shingle style residence dramatically overlooking the village and complemented by a stone and shingle style stable. The house is three stories and has a steep gambrel roof, a full two stories high. It is built of rock-faced bluestone and features a 15-foot-deep (4.6 m) verandah that runs across the front of the main facade. Also on the property is a carriage shed, carriage house, and much of the original landscaping. The estate was placed on the market in July 2007 for $3 million, the highest price ever asked for a private residence in Otsego County.

It was listed on the National Register of Historic Places in 1978.
