= Gilbertsville, New York =

- Village
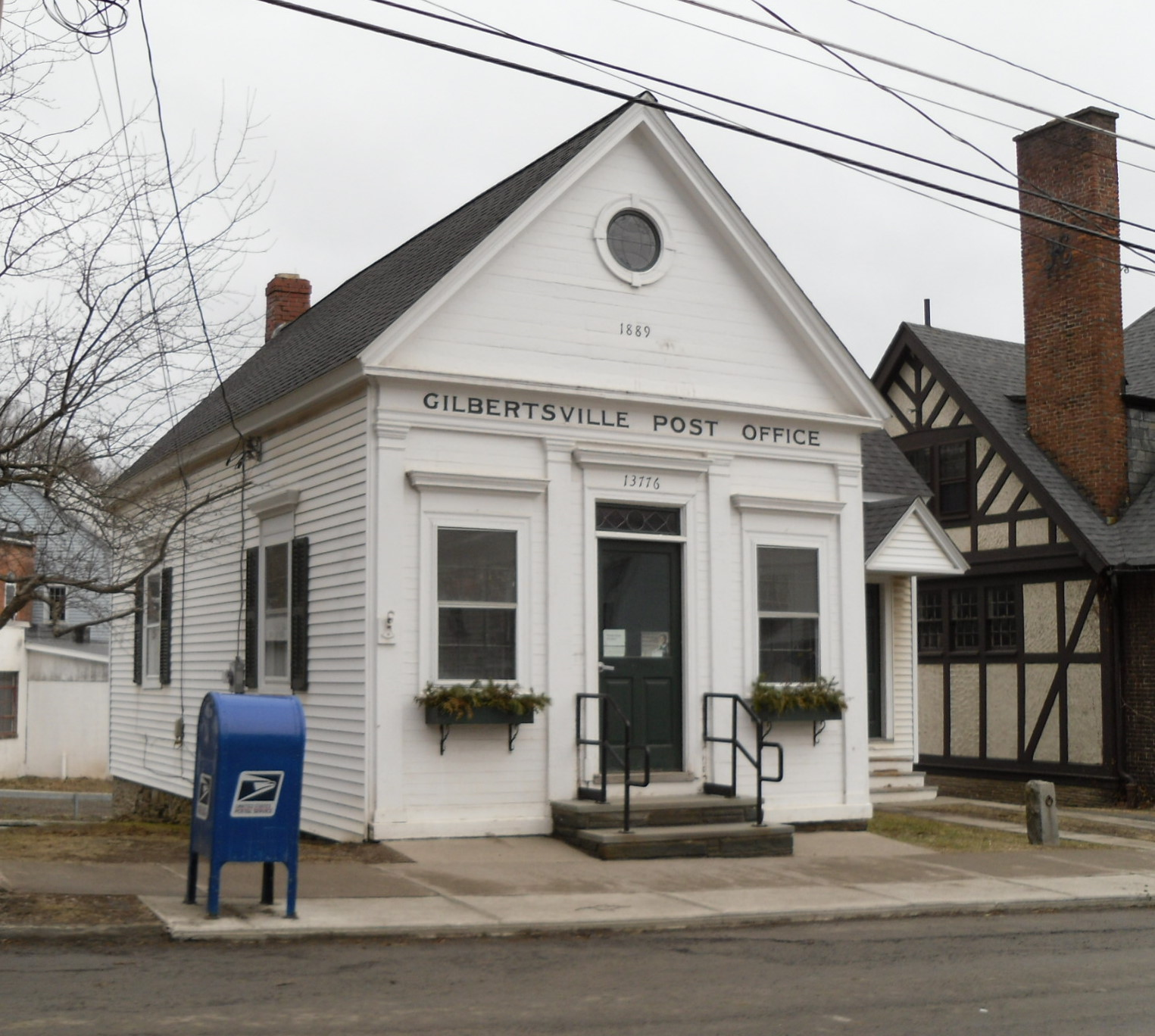
- Gilbertsville Post Office, March 2010

- Location within the state of New York
- Coordinates: 42°28′10″N 75°19′16″W
- Country: United States
- State: New York
- County: Otsego
- Town: Butternuts

Area
  - Total: 1.00 sq mi (2.60 km^{2})
  - Land: 1.00 sq mi (2.60 km^{2})
  - Water: 0 sq mi (0.00 km^{2})
- Elevation: 1,093 ft (333 m)

Population (2020)
  - Total: 308
  - Density: 307.2/sq mi (118.61/km^{2})
- Time zone: UTC-5 (Eastern (EST))
  - Summer (DST): UTC-4 (EDT)
- ZIP code: 13776
- Area code: 607
- FIPS code: 36-28959
- GNIS feature ID: 0951099
- Website: www.gilbertsvilleny.gov

Gilbertsville is a village in Otsego County, New York, United States. As of the 2020 census, Gilbertsville had a population of 308. The village is in the town of Butternuts and is west of Oneonta.

== Geography ==
Gilbertsville is located at 42°28′10″N 75°19′16″W (42.469492, −75.320980).

According to the United States Census Bureau, the village has a total area of 1.0 square mile (2.6 km^{2}), all land.

Gilbertsville is located on New York State Route 51 (Marion Avenue) and is also served by County Highways 4 (Cliff Street and Bloom Street) and 8 (Vale Street).

Gilbertsville is located by the Butternut Creek.

== Demographics ==
Historical population
Census	Pop.	Note	%±
1900	476		—
1910	455		−4.4%
1920	419		−7.9%
1930	362		−13.6%
1940	377		4.1%
1950	456		21.0%
1960	522		14.5%
1970	552		5.7%
1980	455		−17.6%
1990	388		−14.7%
2000	375		−3.4%
2010	399		6.4%
2020	308		−22.8%
U.S. Decennial Census

As of the census of 2000, there were 375 people, 164 households, and 103 families residing in the village. The population density was 374.0 inhabitants per square mile (144.4/km^{2}). There were 196 housing units at an average density of 195.5 per square mile (75.5/km^{2}). The racial composition of the village was 96.27% White, 0.80% African American, 0.80% aboriginal American, 0.27% Asian, and 1.87% from two or more races. Hispanic or Latino of any race were 1.33% of the population.

There were 164 households, out of which 25.0% had children under the age of 18 years living with them, 51.8% were married couples living together, 9.1% had a female householder with no husband present, and 36.6% were non-families. 31.7% of all households were composed of individuals, and 20.1% had someone living alone who was 65 years of age or older. The average household size was 2.27 and the average family size was 2.88.

In the village, the population was spread out, with 24.3% under the age of 18 years, 4.8% from 18 to 24, 23.7% from 25 to 44, 23.2% from 45 to 64, and 24.0% who were 65 years of age or older. The median age was 43 years. For every 100 females, there were 78.6 males. For every 100 females age 18 and over, there were 72.1 males.

The median income for a household in the village was $39,000, and the median income for a family was $46,667. Males had a median income of $33,750 versus $26,500 for females. The per capita income for the village was $19,119. About 3.2% of families and 5.8% of the population were below the poverty line, including 6.7% of those under age 18 and 3.9% of those age 65 or over.

== History ==
=== Early history ===
The village was the first settlement in the town, named after landowner Abijah Gilbert of Nuneaton, England, father of the United States Senator from Florida, also named Abijah Gilbert.

=== Disputes about damming Butternut Creek ===
According to the article "Goliath Met David on the Banks of the Butternut Creek," by Leigh C. Eckmair, for much of the 20th century, the Village of Gilbertsville lived under threat of destruction by a U.S. Army Corps of Engineers’ flood control project. A dam of the Upper Susquehanna Rivershed Project was to be built on the lower Butternut Creek at a spot called Cope's Corners. This dam was to flood the valley behind it, including the village of Gilbertsville, to create a three-mile long lake. Residents had been watching in horror over the years as communities in the nearby Catskills had become victims of similar projects and had vowed not to let it happen to their small village.

The dam project, originally proposed prior to World War I, met with very strong local opposition every time it was reintroduced. Delayed due to World War I and the Great Depression, the project was reintroduced in 1935 following a flood which did millions of dollars of damage to communities in eight southern tier counties in upstate New York. Funding was appropriated, but the project was delayed because of World War II.

In the early 1950s, the Village of Gilbertsville was again endangered when the U.S. Congress reauthorized funding for the project. A locally organized protest began to call attention to the negative aspects of the project on a state and federal level. The protest was very active from the 1950s through the 1970s.

During this time, several important studies of Gilbertsville and Butternut Valley architecture were compiled. These studies called attention to the fact that a number of well known architects of the late 19th and early 20th centuries had been responsible for the design, building and renovation of many attractive village structures. As a result, a number of architectural scholars became involved in protesting the dam project which would destroy this legacy. From that effort came the suggestion that several structures in the center of the village be nominated to the new Department of the Interior's National Register of Historic Places. It was hoped that National Register recognition would afford some protection for the village, on the state and federal level, from the proposed dams.

The Committee for the Historic Preservation of Gilbertsville was formed to work with the N.Y. State Office of Parks and Recreation and to prepare nominations, documentation and photographs. Consultants came to inspect the nominated properties and saw that other structures and sites in the village were equally worthy of nomination. The suggestion was made that the entire village be inventoried as a complete Historic District and that the recognition of the entire village as an Historic District would be even more powerful protection from the dams.

The committee called on the community for help with the expanded project and was not disappointed. Over seven years the full committee of 19 volunteer researchers, typists, 'gofers'," and photographers prepared a total of 194 individual structural inventory reports plus reports for each cemetery, park, bridge and five additional structures just outside the village incorporation.

The committee wrote a sixteen-page pamphlet describing the importance of the Historic District, its setting and architecture, including photographs, and presented it to the congressional committee considering funding of the project.

The same committee analyzed a century's worth of weather history in the Upper Susquehanna Rivershed, documenting flooding on the lower Susquehanna River. The study found that no significant flooding occurred in the areas drained by the Butternut Creek and the Unadilla River during times of damaging floods on the lower Susquehanna River.

The combination of all these efforts was rewarded when deauthorization of funding for the complete Upper Susquehanna River Shed Project was proposed to Congress in 1979, and the threat of the construction of the dams was removed.

The National Register of Historic Places recognition of the entire village of Gilbertsville as a Historic District was awarded in May 1983.

In September 2003, a weathervane was sold for $205,000 to Raymond and Susan Egan of Princeton, New Jersey. It stood atop the Grange Hall (formerly a presbyterian church), and was created in 1902 by J.L. Mott Company of New York City. The weathervane depicted Uncas (1588-c.1683), an indigenous war chief of the Mohegan tribe. It was replaced with a copy, but the sale resulted in a significant dispute regarding ownership, and who had the authority to sell it.

== Architecture ==
Some of the more noteworthy pieces of architecture that can be found in Gilbertsville include the following:

- Gilbertsville Historic District – a national historic district listed on the National Register of Historic Places in 1974 and increased to approximately the incorporated village borders in 1982.
- Overlook Park – This 100-year-old park sits next to a stone arch bridge surrounded by stone buildings.
- Gilbertsville Academy & Collegiate Institute – Built in Greek Revival style in 1839, served as a school until 1935.
- Presbyterian Church – Built in a Picturesque style in 1888.
- Tianderah – Built in 1887 by Boston-based architect William Ralph Emerson it is a stone Romanesque Revival residence dramatically overlooking the village and complemented by a stone and shingle style stable The estate was placed on the market in July 2007 for $3 million, the highest price ever asked for a private residence in Otsego County.
- Gilbert Block – This Neo-Tudor Style structure built 1893 – 1895, hosts shops and artists' studios. It was designed by Boston architect Henry Forbes Bigelow
- The Gilbertsville Free Library – Built in 1818 as a school/academy, it was converted to a library by St. Louis architects Eames and Young in 1888. It was the first Free Association Library in Otsego County.
- The Major's Inn – Started in 1896 and finished in 1917 on the site of the original Gilbert homstead which burned in 1895. The medieval English Tudor and Gothic building was commissioned by Major James L. Gilbert employing Augustus Nicholas Allen to construct it. Today it serves as a cultural center.
- Gilbertsville Water Works – listed on the National Register of Historic Places in 2011.
