= William Ralph Emerson =

American architect (1833–1917)

- Born: March 11, 1833; Alton, Illinois
- Died: November 23, 1917 (aged 84); Milton, Massachusetts
- Occupation: Architect

William Ralph Emerson (March 11, 1833 – November 23, 1917) was an American architect. He partnered with Carl Fehmer in Emerson and Fehmer.

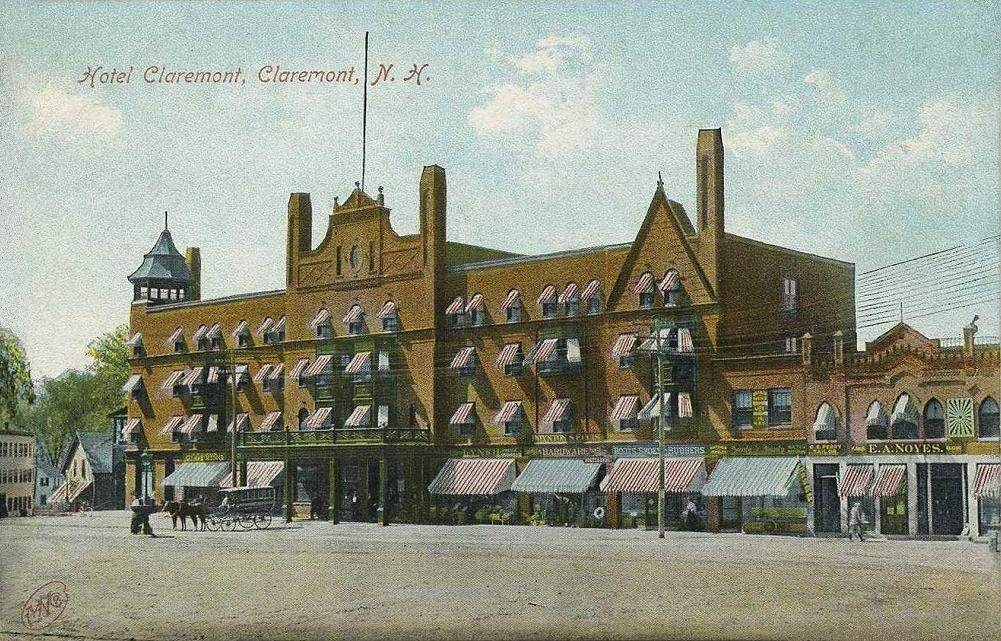
The Hotel Claremont, built in 1890–1892, Claremont, New Hampshire

== Early life and education ==
A cousin of Ralph Waldo Emerson, William was born in Alton, Illinois, and trained in the office of Jonathan Preston (1801–1888), an architect–builder in Boston. He formed an architectural partnership with Preston (1857–1861), practiced alone for two years, then partnered with Carl Fehmer (1864–1873).

He is best known for his Shingle Style houses and inns, many of them in Bar Harbor, Maine. He worked with fellow Boston designer Frederick Law Olmsted on the creation of the National Zoo in Washington, D.C., designing several of the zoo's first buildings.

Emerson was a friend of the Boston painter William Morris Hunt, who painted a portrait of Emerson's son Ralph, shown at an exhibition of Hunt's work at the Boston Museum of Fine Arts in 1880.

Emerson died in Milton, Massachusetts.

== Personal life ==
On September 15, 1873 he married Sylvia Hathaway Watson.

== Selected works ==
- 1869 Sanford-Covell Villa Marina , 72 Washington Street, Newport, Rhode Island
- 1869 Marsh-Billings-Rockefeller Mansion renovation, Woodstock, Vermont
- 1875 Massachusetts Homeopathic Hospital, Harrison Avenue, Boston, Massachusetts
- 1878 Eustis Estate, Canton Avenue, Milton, Massachusetts
- 1878 Summer cottage of Boston painter William Morris Hunt, Magnolia, Massachusetts
- 1879 Redwood, C. J. Morrill House, Bar Harbor, Maine
- 1881 Boston Art Club, 150 Newbury Street, Boston, Massachusetts
- 1887 Saint Jude's Episcopal Church, Seal Harbor, Mount Desert, Maine
- 1887 Saint Margaret's Roman Catholic Church, Beverly Farms, Massachusetts
- 1887 Tianderah, stone and shingle residence, Gilbertsville, New York; Listed on the National Historic Register, November 2, 1978 #78001894
- 1888 Fitz Cottage, Jackson, New Hampshire
- 1889 William James House, 95 Irving Street, Cambridge, Massachusetts
- 1890 The Reading Room, now part of the Bar Harbor Inn, Bar Harbor, Maine
- 1890–1892 The Hotel Claremont, Claremont, New Hampshire
- 1896 Felsted, a cottage for Frederick Law Olmsted, Deer Isle, Maine
