= Gilbertsville Academy =

Coordinates: 42.4718°N 75.3288°W

Gilbertsville Academy and Collegiate Institute

Information
- Established: 1840
- Closed: 1935

The Gilbertsville Academy and Collegiate Institute was a school located in Gilbertsville, New York. Founded in 1840, it operated as a private school until 1910, after which it was transferred to the public school system. It continued in use as a school until 1935. The school building still stands, though greatly modified, and is a contributing structure to the Gilbertsville Historic District.
