= Eustis Estate =

- Eustis Estate Historic District
- U.S. National Register of Historic Places
- U.S. Historic district
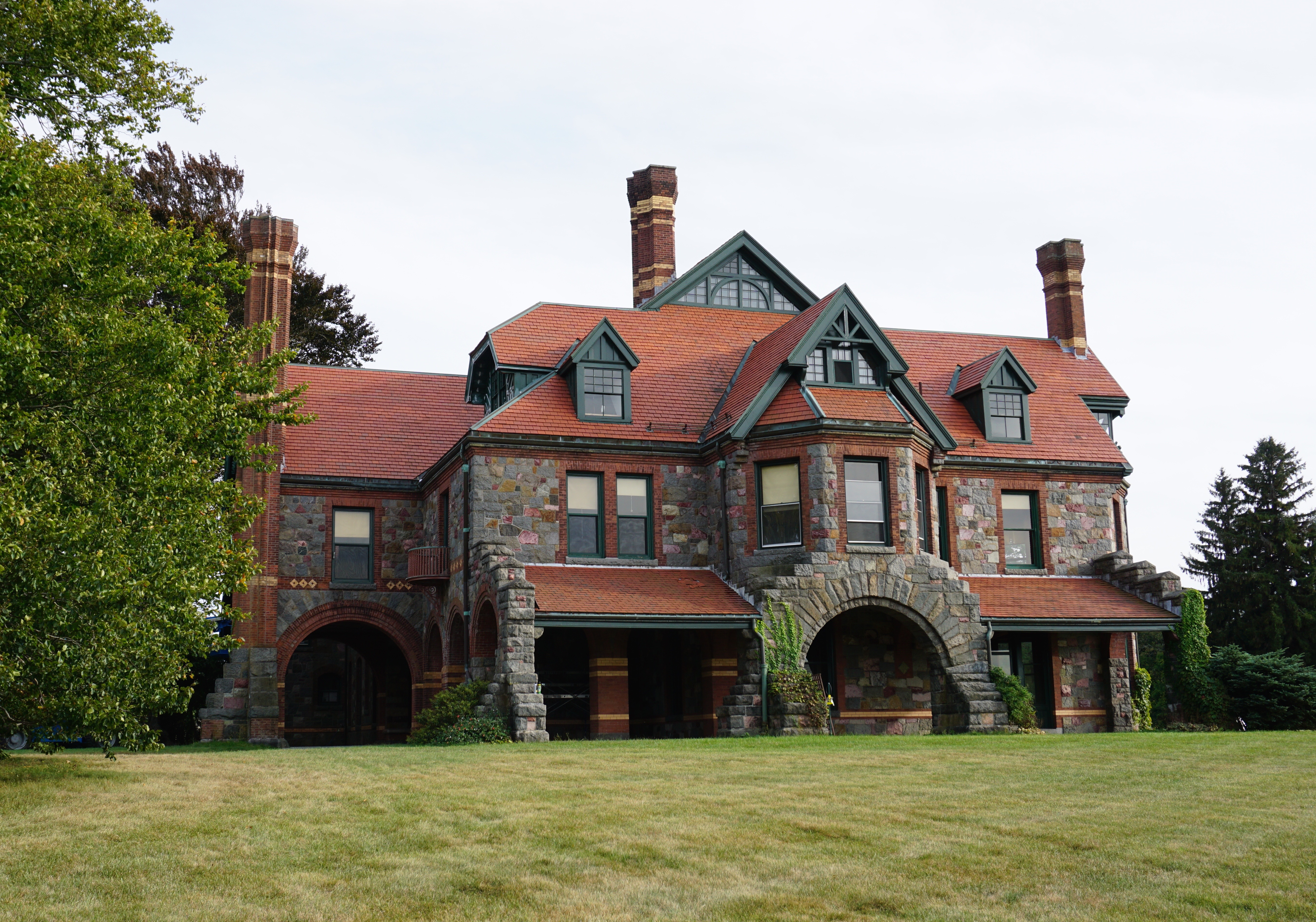

- Location within Massachusetts Location within the United States
- Location: 1424 Canton Avenue, Milton, Massachusetts
- Coordinates: 42°13′54″N 71°6′27″W
- Area: 110 acres (45 ha)
- Architect: William Ralph Emerson and others
- Architectural style: Late Victorian
- NRHP reference No.: 16000099
- Added to NRHP: March 22, 2016

The Eustis Estate is a historic family estate on Canton Avenue in Milton, Massachusetts. Its centerpiece is the mansion house of William Ellery Channing Eustis, an eclectic Late Victorian stone building designed by preeminent architect William Ralph Emerson and constructed in 1878. The estate also includes several other houses associated with the Eustis family, and a gatehouse and stable historically associated with the main estate. The estate was listed on the National Register of Historic Places as a historic district in 2016. Most of the original estate is owned by Historic New England, and was opened to the public as a museum property in 2017.

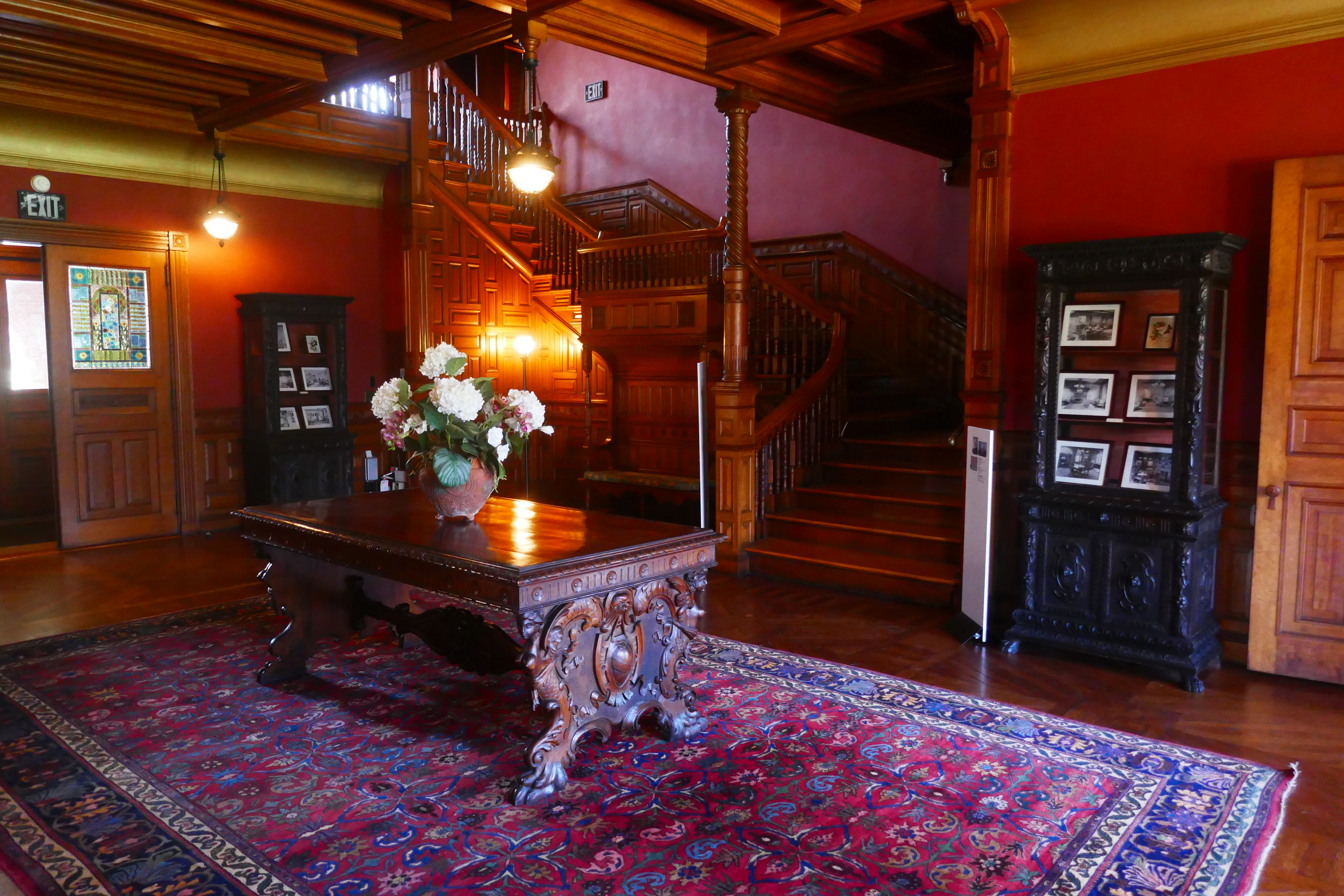
Interior of mansion

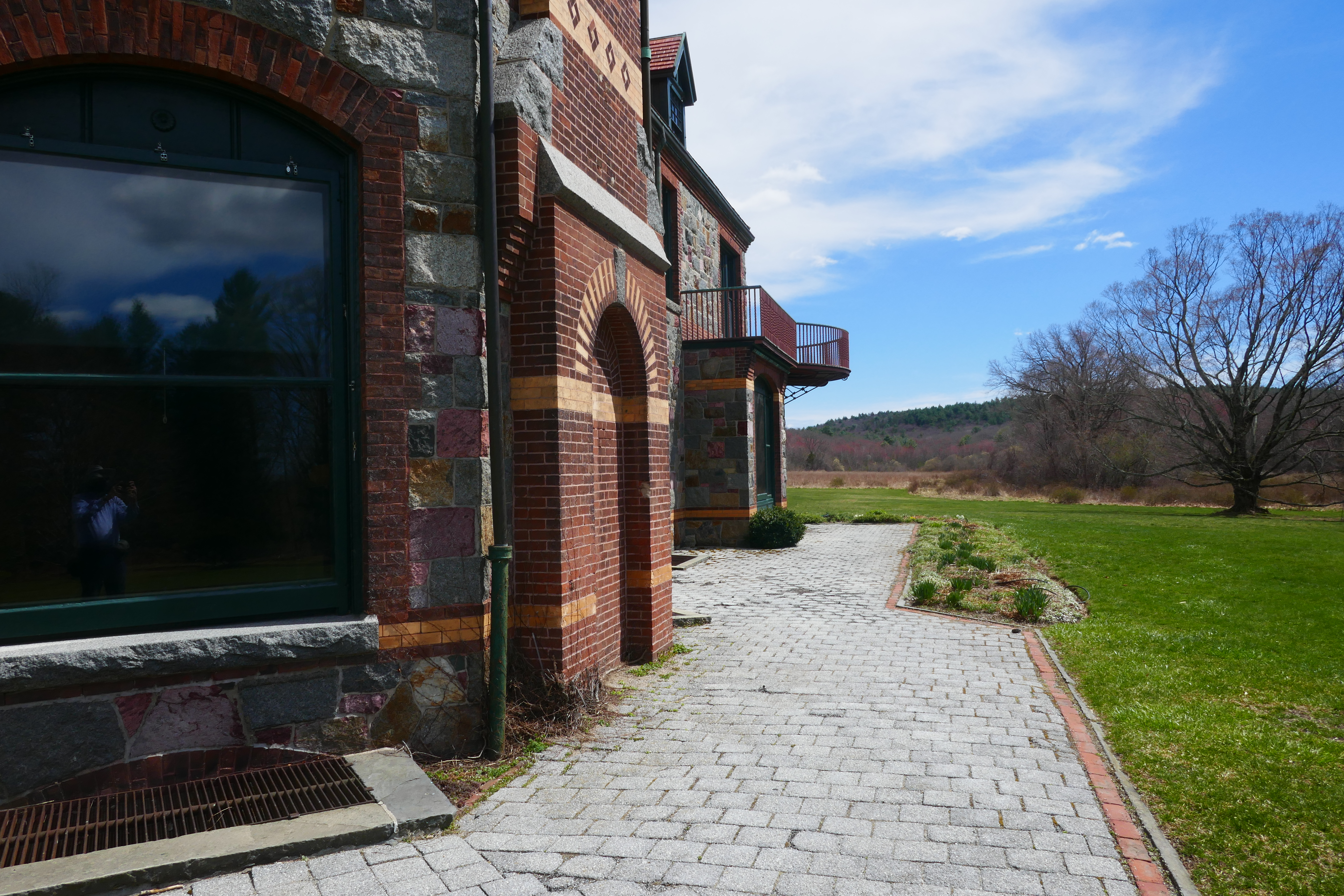
Mansion with Blue Hills in the distance

== Description and history ==
The Eustis Estate occupies 110 acres (45 ha) of uplands in a rural-residential area of Milton, and abuts the Blue Hills Reservation at its rear. 80 acres (32 ha) of the estate are protected by conservation easements. It is located on the southeast side of Canton Avenue, just east of its junction with Dollar Lane. Set close to Canton Avenue are two houses, one of which is a 1950 ranch house that is not historically significant, but stands on land subdivided from the estate in the 1940s. The other is a three-story wood-frame house, built in Hyde Park by Frederick A Eustis II in the 1890s and moved to this location in 1910. Standing across the street from each other are a stable and gatehouse, both built out of uncoursed stone. These were designed by William Ellery Channing Eustis and built in the late 19th century; the stable is now in separate ownership and has been converted to residential use.

The main house stands well back from the road, and is now accessed via a drive located south of the gatehouse. It is a three-story masonry structure, exhibiting an eclectic mix of stylistic elements from popular late-19th century styles. It is built out of local stone, with accents of red and yellow brick, and is covered by a red tile roof. It has a porte-cochere with Romanesque arches, and numerous gables and projecting sections that are typical of the Queen Anne style. Its roof is pierced by six chimneys, which exhibit multi-colored bands of brickwork. The house was built in 1878 to a design by Milton architect William Ralph Emerson.

The estate was developed beginning in 1878 by William Ellery Channing Eustis, whose family had long owned land in the area, augmented by land acquired through the family of his wife, Edith Hemenway, who was an heir to her father Augustus Hemenway's mercantile fortune. The estate house remained in the family until it was sold in 2012 to Historic New England (HNE), a regional architectural historic preservation organization. HNE has also acquired the Frederick Lothrop II House.

== Current uses ==
The house is operated as a museum that exhibits artwork owned by Historic New England; it can be rented for weddings and other events. In 2021, a sculpture exhibit was installed on the grounds in cooperation with the New England Sculptors Association.

== See also ==
- National Register of Historic Places listings in Milton, Massachusetts

== Wiki Commons ==
Media related to Eustis Estate at Wikimedia Commons
