= Major's Inn and Gilbert Block =

Historic commercial building in New York, United States

- U.S. National Register of Historic Places
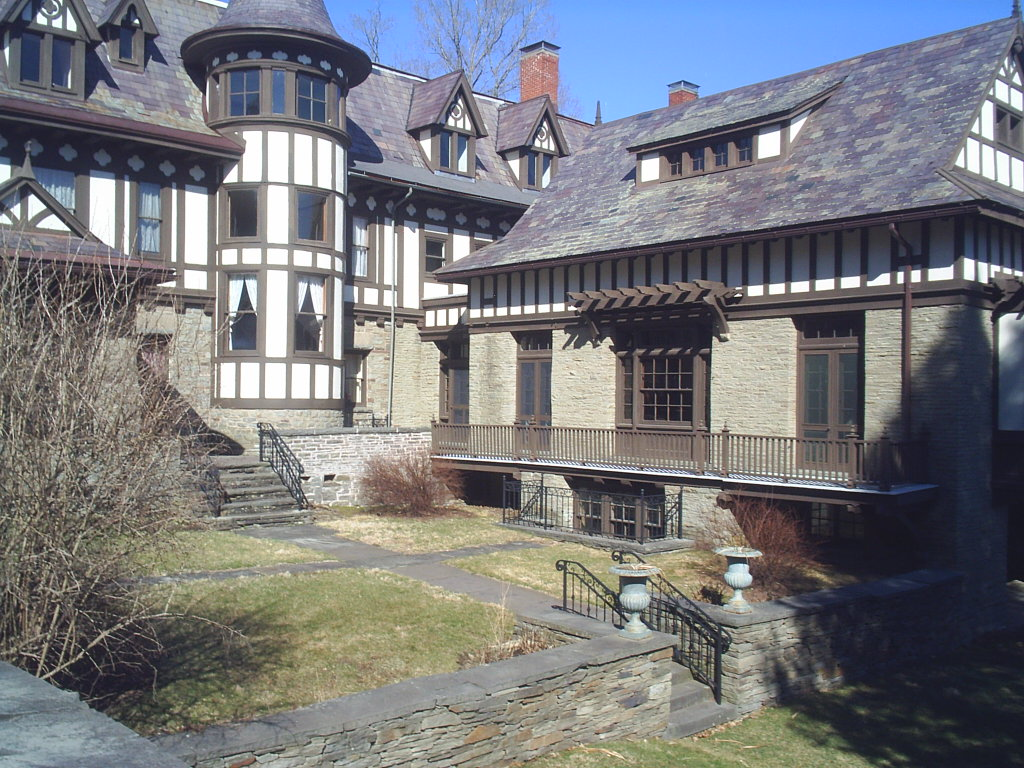
- Major's Inn and Gilbert Block, March 2006

- Location within New York Location within the United States
- Location: Both sides of Commercial St. near NY 51, Gilbertsville, New York
- Coordinates: 42°28′17″N 75°19′39″W
- Area: 5 acres (2.0 ha)
- Built: 1895
- Architect: Allen, Augustus; Bigelow, H.F., Co.
- NRHP reference No.: 73001249
- Added to NRHP: April 11, 1973

Major's Inn and Gilbert Block is a historic inn and tavern and commercial building at Gilbertsville in Otsego County, New York. The Gilbert Block consists of three 2-story attached brick commercial structures varying slightly in height in the Neo-Tudor Style. It was built between 1893 and 1895, and hosts shops and artist's studios. It was designed by Boston architect Henry Forbes Bigelow. Major's Inn was started in 1896 and finished in 1917 on the site of the original 1822 Gilbert homestead which burned in 1895. It is a 3 1/2-story structure with a gable roof covered in slate, interrupted by a number of chimneys, dormers, and conical roofs on towers. It has a rambling effect accented by the use of a variety of projecting balconies and bays, towers, and several porches. The medieval English Tudor and Gothic building was commissioned by Major James L. Gilbert using Augustus Nicholas Allen to construct it. Decorative elements on both buildings incorporate the quatrefoil. The Inn went through a series of owners during the 1950s to 1970s and, beginning in 1980, a group founded by Alan Cleinman which became the Major's Inn Foundation, Inc. began to raise funds for the purchase of the property. Today, under the ownership of the Foundation, the Major's Inn has been significantly restored and serves as a cultural center.

It was listed on the National Register of Historic Places in 1973.
