= Redwood (Bar Harbor, Maine) =

Historic house in Maine, United States

- U.S. National Register of Historic Places
- Location within Maine Location within the United States
- Location: 10 Barberry Lane, Bar Harbor, Maine
- Coordinates: 44°22′58″N 68°11′48″W
- Area: 1 acre (0.40 ha)
- Built: 1879
- Architect: William Ralph Emerson
- Architectural style: Shingle Style
- NRHP reference No.: 78000166
- Added to NRHP: April 3, 1978

Redwood is a historic summer house at 10 Barberry Lane in Bar Harbor, Maine, United States. Designed by William Ralph Emerson and built in 1879, it was the first Shingle style house built in Bar Harbor, and is one of the oldest of the style in the nation. The house was listed on the National Register of Historic Places in 1978.

== Description ==
Redwood is set near the southeastern end of Barberry Lane, south of the main village of Bar Harbor, on a point north of Cromwell Cove that overlooks Frenchman Bay. It is a large 2 1/2-story wood-frame structure with a roughly cruciform plan, set on a fieldstone foundation. It has a long north–south axis with roughly centered projections to the east (facing the water) and the west (facing toward the street). The western projection is gabled-roofed, with a second-floor chamber set above a porte-cochere which shelters the main entrance. To its right a tall two-story window rises to a small gabled peak, with an elaborately decorated brick Queen Anne style chimney to its right. The eastern projection has a polygonal shape, with a semi-pyramidal roofline. The southern elevation has a recessed Palladian window set in a half-timbered upper section. An enclosed single-story polygonal porch projects from the southeast corner of the building. The interior of the house is richly decorated with woodwork.

== History ==
Bar Harbor began to develop a reputation as a summer resort area in the 1860s, with its early tourist trade served by local residents boarding visitors in their houses, and by hotels that were built to meet the demand. In the 1870s wealthy visitors began building private houses. C. J. Morrill, a wealthy Bostonian, commissioned William Ralph Emerson to design this house, which was completed in 1879. This was the first (of many) residential commission Emerson executed in the Bar Harbor area, and was his first full expression of the Shingle style, whose oldest known example is the 1875 William Watts Sherman House in Newport, Rhode Island, designed by H. H. Richardson.

Later owners included J. Howland Auchincloss, whose son Louis Auchincloss was considered one of the inheritors of the Edith Wharton tradition in literature. In the 1940s, Mrs. Jaqueline Kennedy Onassis, then known as Jaqueline Bouvier stayed at Redwood with her step-father Hugh Auchincloss.

== See also ==
- National Register of Historic Places listings in Hancock County, Maine
