= Charles W. Jones =

American politician (1834–1897)

Charles William Jones
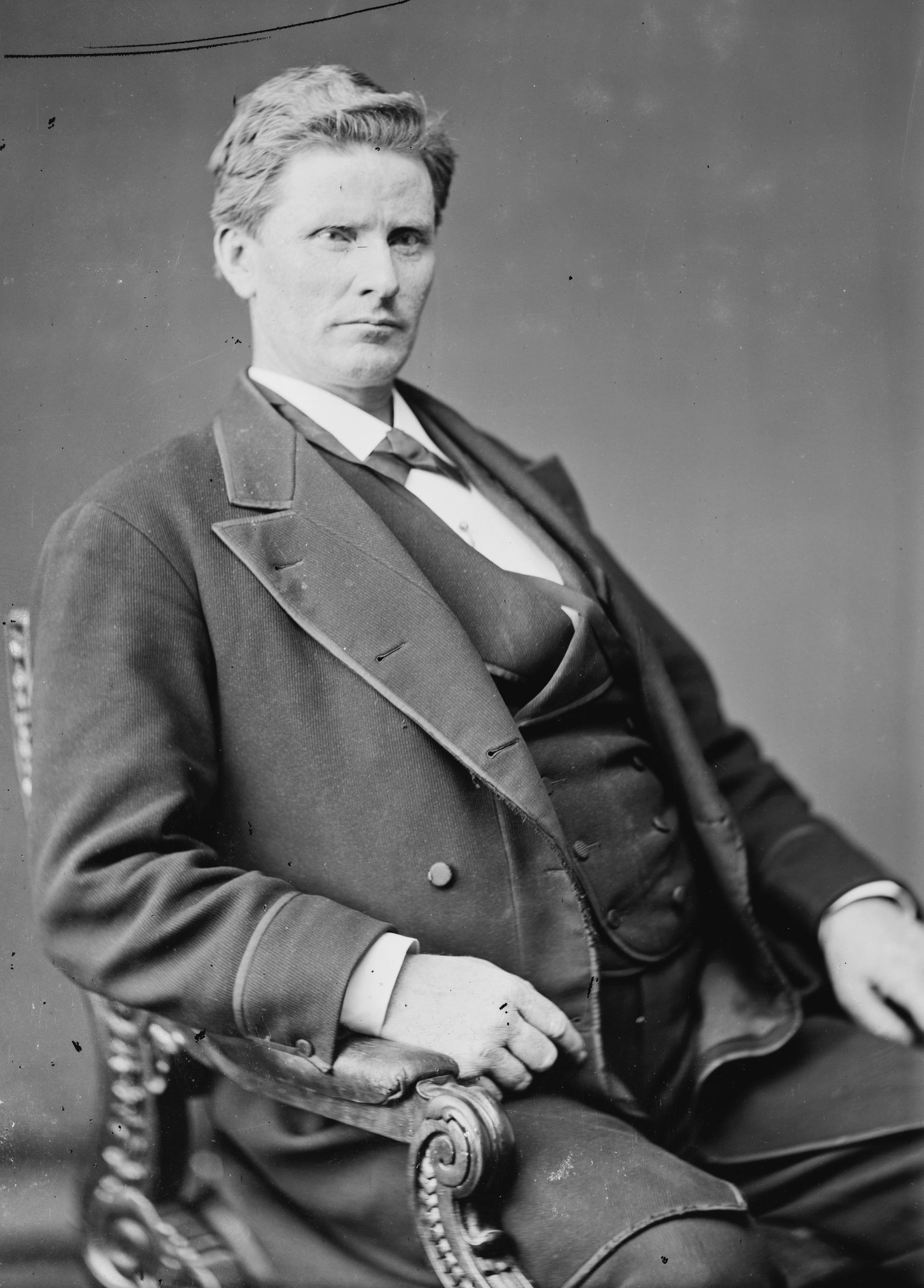

United States Senator from Florida
- In office March 4, 1875 – March 3, 1887
- Preceded by: Abijah Gilbert
- Succeeded by: Samuel Pasco

Member of the Florida House of Representatives
- In office 1874–1875

Personal details
- Born: December 24, 1834 Balbriggan, Ireland
- Died: October 11, 1897 (aged 62) Dearborn, Michigan, U.S.
- Resting place: St. Michael's Cemetery, Pensacola, Florida, U.S.
- Party: Democratic
- Spouse: Mary Ada Quigley (m. 1861–1880, her death)
- Children: 4
- Profession: Attorney

Charles William Jones (December 24, 1834 – October 11, 1897) was an American attorney and politician. A Democrat, he served as a United States senator from Florida from 1875 to 1887. Jones abandoned his seat near the end of his second term, and it remained vacant for a year until a successor was elected. Jones was later diagnosed as mentally ill, and was hospitalized at a Dearborn, Michigan asylum for seven years before his death.

== Early life ==
Jones was born in Balbriggan, Ireland on December 24, 1834. His father was a British army surgeon who died when Jones was a child. In 1844, Jones and his mother immigrated to New York City. After attending school in New York City and St. Louis, Missouri, Jones moved to Louisiana and later to Mississippi. He settled in Santa Rosa County, Florida in 1854, where he worked as a carpenter.

After his arrival in Florida, Jones studied law, attained admission to the bar in 1857, and moved to Pensacola. In addition to practicing law, Jones was appointed tax assessor for Santa Rosa and Escambia Counties. He married Mary Ada Quigley of Mobile, Alabama in 1861; they were the parents of eight children, four of whom lived to adulthood. Mary Quigley Jones died in 1880, and Jones did not remarry.

== Political career ==
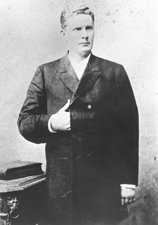
U.S. Senator Charles W. Jones (D-Florida)

A Democrat, Jones was a delegate to the 1872 Democratic National Convention. Later in 1872 ran for the U.S. House of Representatives and was defeated by William Purman. In 1874, Jones won a seat on the Florida House of Representatives, an election that was notable because his margin of victory was only five votes.

In early 1875, the state legislature elected Jones to the U.S. Senate. He was reelected in 1881 and served from March 4, 1875, to March 3, 1887. Jones represented the conservative faction Democrats, which saw his election as "overthrowing of the Carpet-Bag rule in Florida." He soon proved his party loyalty by condemning Louisiana for its continuation of Republican-led Reconstruction. During the dispute that followed the 1876 United States presidential election, he objected to counting Florida's electoral votes for Republican Rutherford B. Hayes.

During his senate career, Jones served as chairman of the Joint Committee on Public Buildings and Grounds (1879–1881) and the Committee on Revolutionary Claims (1883–1887). In addition, he served on the Naval Affairs and Commerce committees.

== Mental decline ==
In the spring of 1885, Jones announced he was taking a vacation in Canada and Detroit, Michigan, including a visit with former Detroit mayor William G. Thompson, a relative by marriage. When the vacation extended into early 1886, rumors suggested that Jones was pursuing a wealthy woman named Clotilde Palms, daughter of Francis Palms, and that he was refusing to leave Detroit without her. By April 1886, rumors suggested that Jones had become obsessed with Palms and had become insane.

When Jones failed to appear for the 1886–1887 congressional session, senate leaders removed him from his committee assignments and appointed replacements. Although this drew vocal ire from Jones, he continued to live at a Detroit hotel. Florida newspapers began campaigning for Jones to be replaced, but Governor Edward A. Perry refused to act, citing the lack of rules or precedent regarding a senator who would not work but had not been officially declared physically or mentally impaired. Instead, Jones' seat went vacant until his term expired in March 1887.

== Later life and death ==
After Jones' term ended in 1887, his life quickly spiraled downward. Newspapers provided coverage of his decline nationally. "Senator Jones of Florida, of whom there was so much sensational newspaper talk last year, is now a mental wreck and penniless in Detroit, and dependent upon a friend for food," said one Kentucky paper in early December 1887. By year's end, he had been evicted from his hotel room and was reportedly destitute. In the spring of 1888, Jones had reportedly been reduced to common vagrancy. Palms married a Detroit surgeon in 1889. In May 1890, Jones' son was granted permission to have him restrained and a probate court determined conclusively that he had monomania. Jones was then taken into custody and brought to an asylum for the insane in Dearborn, Michigan where he stayed until his death.

Jones died in Dearborn on October 11, 1897. He was buried at St. Michael's Cemetery in Pensacola. In 1977, his Pensacola home, the Charles William Jones House, was added to the National Register of Historic Places.

== See also ==
- List of United States senators born outside the United States
- List of United States senators from Florida
- Florida's congressional delegations

U.S. Senate
Preceded by Abijah Gilbert	U.S. senator (Class 1) from Florida; 1875–1887; Served alongside: Simon B. Conover, Wilkinson Call	Succeeded by Samuel Pasco
