= C. Crawford Hollidge =

Coordinates: 42°21′20″N 71°3′46.2″W

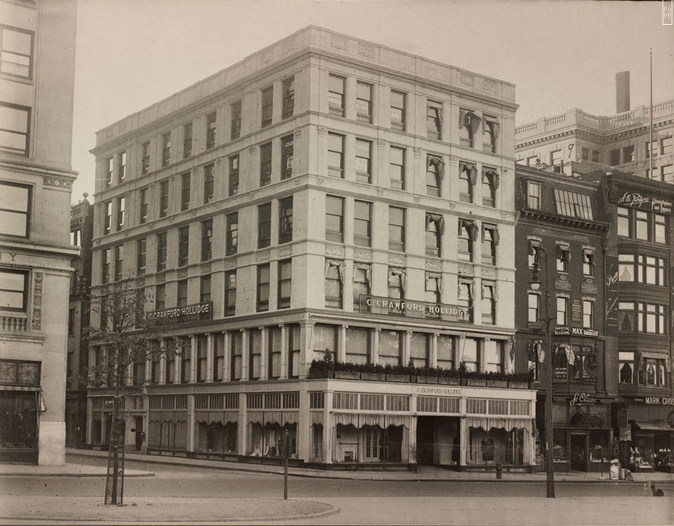
Crawford Hollidge building. The building was designed by Fehmer & Page, built 1889–1890, and destroyed 1967.

C. Crawford Hollidge was a women's clothing store of Boston in the 20th century.

The business was started by Clarence Crawford Hollidge in 1909, as a dry goods store in Milton, Massachusetts just south of Boston. By 1930 he had transformed the store into a high-end women’s apparel and accessories store.

At its height, C. Crawford Hollidge had four locations in wealthy towns in eastern Massachusetts: Boston, Wellesley, Cohasset on the South Shore, and Hyannis, a Cape Cod resort town.

The flagship downtown Boston store was located at 141 Tremont Street at Temple Place, directly across Temple Place from rival R. H. Stearns. The architects were Fehmer & Page. On February 18, 1967 the building was engulfed by a five alarm fire. It was a total loss and had to be demolished. Crawford Hollidge reopened on Boylston Street, but closed within a few years, and its branch stores also eventually closed.

== In literature ==
In Boston, the next morning, Mrs. Renfrew met Dottie for lunch at the Ritz... later in the afternoon, they had an appointment at Crawford Hollidge for a fitting. Dottie's wedding dress and going-away costume were being made in New York, but on most items, country suits and simple sports things above all, you could do just as well in Boston and at half the price. After Crawford Hollidge, if there was time, they were going to stop at Stearns' to look at linen and compare prices with Filene's. The Renfrews were not rich, only quite comfortably off...

— Mary McCarthy, The Group
