= Simon B. Conover =

American politician (1840–1908)

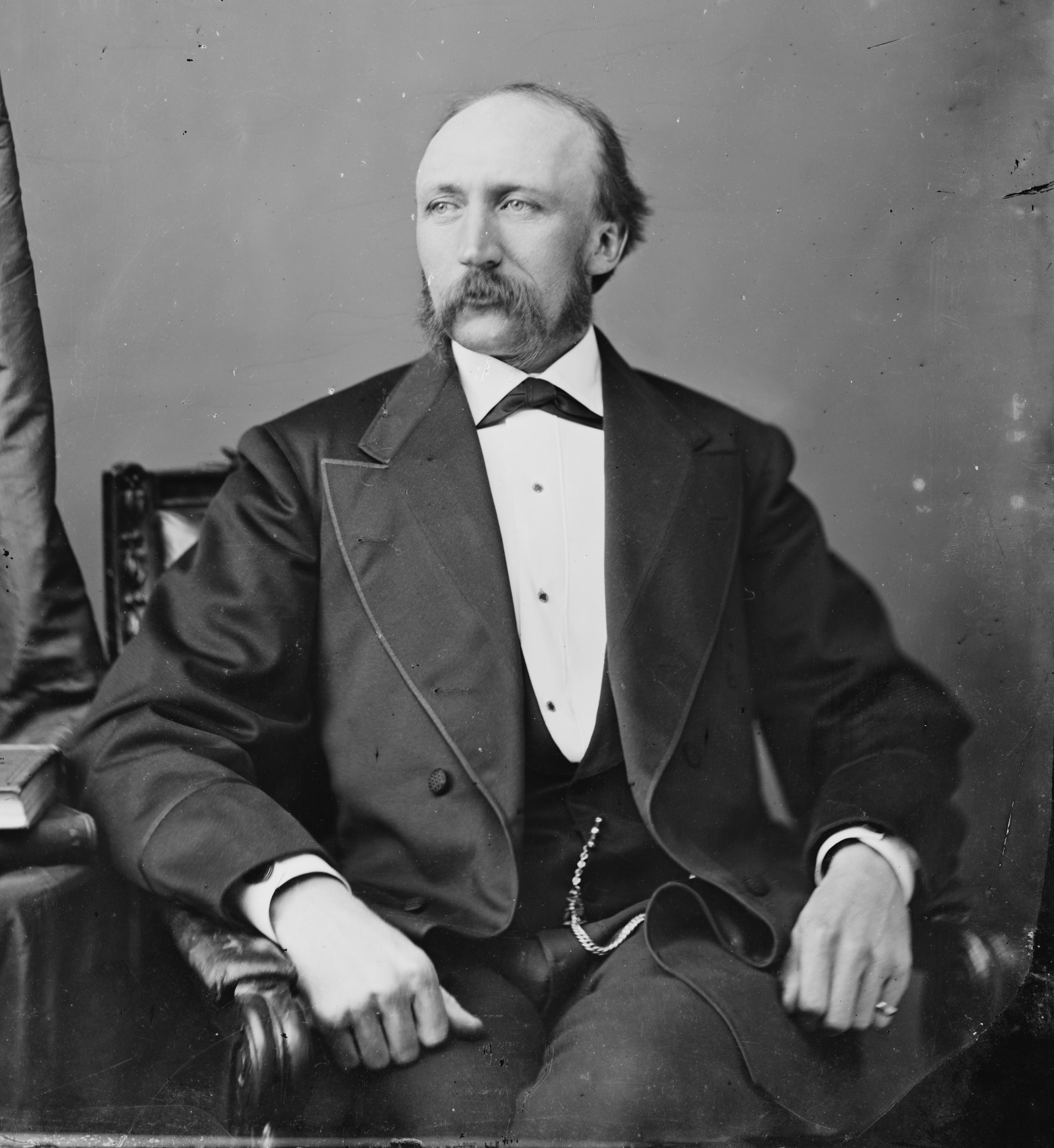
- Conover (c. 1860–1875)

United States Senator from Florida
- In office March 4, 1873 – March 3, 1879
- Preceded by: Thomas W. Osborn
- Succeeded by: Wilkinson Call

4th State Treasurer of Florida
- In office August 19, 1868 – January 16, 1873
- Governor: Harrison Reed; Ossian B. Hart
- Preceded by: Charles H. Austin
- Succeeded by: Charles H. Foster

Member of the Florida House of Representatives
- In office 1873

Personal details
- Born: Simon Barclay Conover; September 23, 1840 Middlesex County, New Jersey, US
- Died: April 19, 1908 (aged 67) Port Townsend, Washington, US
- Party: Republican

Simon Barclay Conover (September 23, 1840 – April 19, 1908) was an American physician and politician who served as a delegate to Florida's 1868 Constitutional Convention, state treasurer, state legislator, and U.S. senator from Florida. He served in the Florida House of Representatives including as Speaker. He was a Republican.

== Biography ==
Born in Middlesex County, New Jersey, Conover attended an academy in Trenton, New Jersey. He studied medicine at the University of Pennsylvania, and graduated from the medical department of the University of Nashville in 1864. During the United States Civil War he served in the medical department of the Union Army. He was appointed acting assistant surgeon in 1866, and was assigned to Lake City, Florida. He resigned from the medical department of the army upon readmission of the State of Florida into the Union.

Conover was a delegate to the State constitutional convention in 1868. He was appointed State treasurer in 1868, serving one term. He was also a member of the Republican National Committee from 1868 to 1872. He was a member of the Florida House of Representatives in 1873 and served as speaker.

Conover was elected to the United States Senate and served from March 4, 1873, to March 3, 1879. There he served as chairman of the U.S. Senate Committee on Enrolled Bills. After his time in Congress, Conover resumed the practice of medicine. He was an unsuccessful Republican candidate for governor in 1880, a delegate to the state constitutional convention in 1885, and was appointed United States surgeon at Port Townsend, Washington, in 1889. He became president of the board of regents of the Agricultural College and School of Science of the State of Washington in 1891. He practiced medicine in Port Townsend until his death, and was interred there in the Masonic Cemetery.

Party political offices
Preceded by Marcellus Stearns	Republican nominee for Governor of Florida; 1880	Succeeded by F. Pope
U.S. Senate
Preceded by Thomas W. Osborn	U.S. senator (Class 3) from Florida; 1873–1879; Served alongside: Abijah Gilbert, Charles W. Jones	Succeeded by Wilkinson Call
