= Gilbertsville Water Works =

- U.S. National Register of Historic Places
- Location within New York Location within the United States
- Location: Reservoir Rd., near Gilbertsville, New York
- Coordinates: 42°29′37″N 75°23′23″W
- Area: 63.62 acres (25.75 ha)
- Built: 1896, 1914-1918
- Architect: Mussen, E. F.; Vrooman and Perry
- Architectural style: Richardson, L. J.
- NRHP reference No.: 11000290
- Added to NRHP: May 18, 2011

Gilbertsville Water Works is a historic waterworks located near Gilbertsville in Otsego County, New York. The original waterworks was constructed in 1896, and substantially enlarged and improved between 1914 and 1918. It includes three dams, a pond, storage reservoir, gate house, control house, filter beds, distribution reservoir, water treatment building, and other associated features.

It was listed on the National Register of Historic Places in 2011.
