= Charles William Jones House =

Historic house in Florida, United States

- U.S. National Register of Historic Places
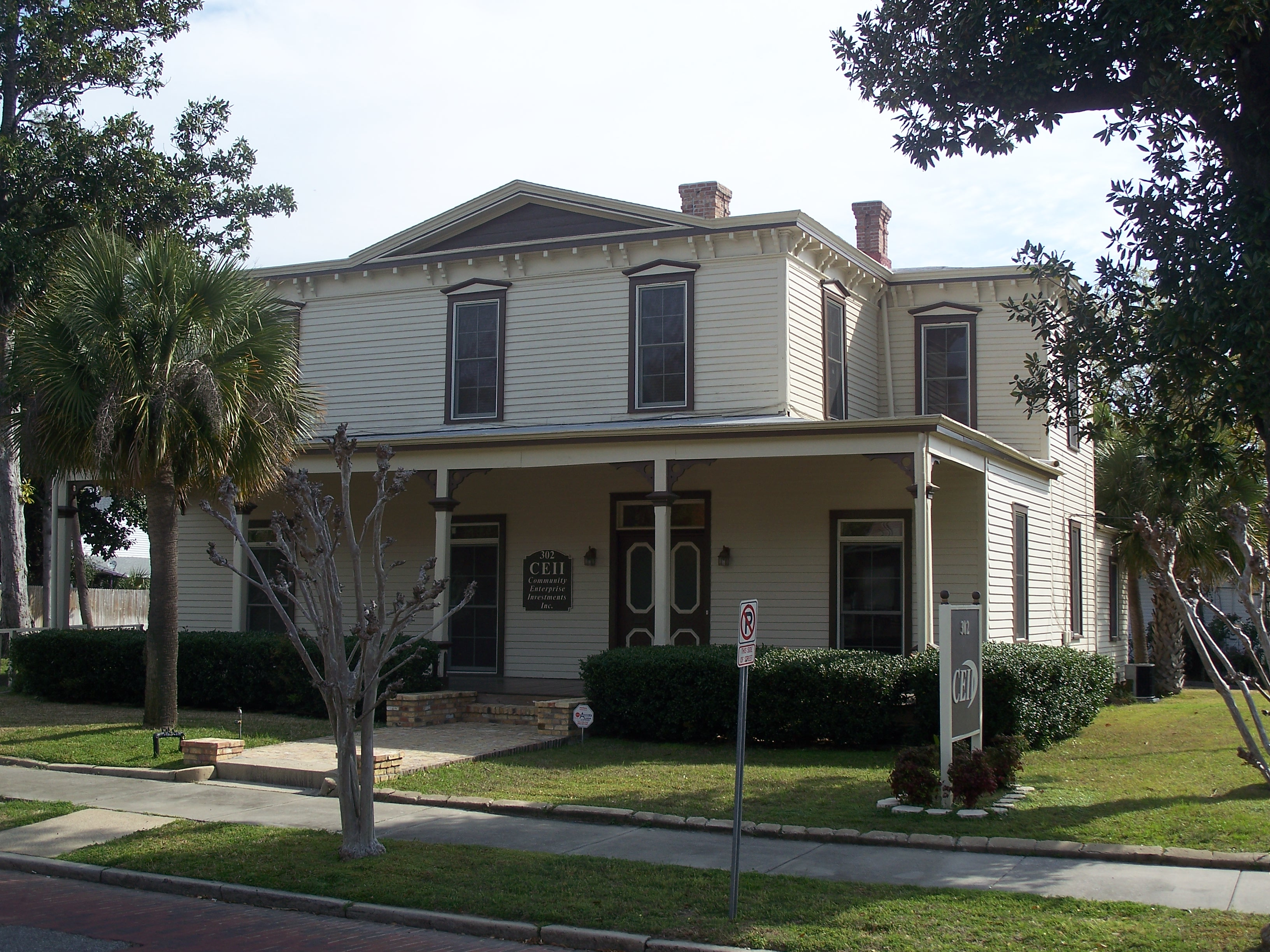

- Location within Florida Location within the United States
- Location: Pensacola, Florida
- Coordinates: 30°24′58″N 87°13′12″W
- Area: less than one acre
- Architectural style: Frame Vernacular
- NRHP reference No.: 77000403
- Added to NRHP: 20 December 1977

The Charles William Jones House (also known as John B. Jones) is a historic home in Pensacola, Florida. Named for U.S. Senator Charles W. Jones, it is located at 302 North Barcelona Street. On December 20, 1977, it was added to the U.S. National Register of Historic Places.
