= Beaconsfield Terraces Historic District =

Historic district in Massachusetts, United States

- U.S. National Register of Historic Places
- U.S. Historic district
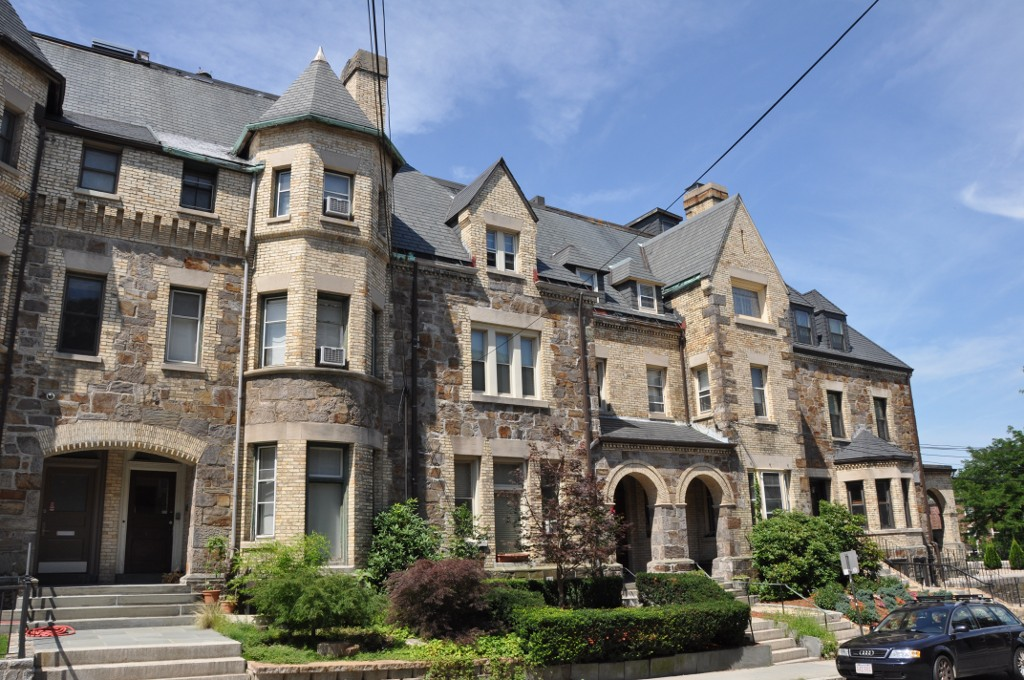

- Location within Massachusetts Location within the United States
- Location: 11–25, 33–43, and 44–55 Garrison Rd. and 316–326, 332–344, and 350–366 Tappan St., Brookline, Massachusetts
- Coordinates: 42°20′15″N 71°8′11″W
- Area: 6 acres (2.4 ha)
- Architect: Fehmer & Page
- Architectural style: Colonial Revival, Renaissance, Chateauesque, Flemish
- MPS: Brookline MRA
- NRHP reference No.: 85003248
- Added to NRHP: October 17, 1985

The Beaconsfield Terraces Historic District is a residential historic district at 11–25, 33–43, and 44–55 Garrison Rd. and 316–326, 332–344, and 350–366 Tappan Street in Brookline, Massachusetts. It encompasses a collection of architecturally distinctive row houses that were built between 1889 and 1892 by a single developer, and represent a unique early success in condominium ownership. The district was listed on the National Register of Historic Places in 1985.

== Description and history ==
The Beaconsfield Terraces are roughly centered on the junction of Tappan Street and Garrison Road, a short way west of Brookline's Washington Square. Three of the six buildings line the west side of Tappan Street, while the other three line the north side of Garrison Road. A seventh building, not included in this historic district, fronts on Beacon Street, and is included in the Beacon Street Historic District. The oldest of the buildings, 350–366 Tappan, was built in 1889 out of yellow brick and stone, and has Chateauesque styling, a style used in four of the six buildings. These buildings feature steeply pitched roofs, round-arch entranceways, corbelled brickwork decoration, gabled wall dormers, and polygonal window bays. One building has a distinctively Flemish character, with buttressed wall gables, and limestone pinnacles. The last two buildings are Georgian Revival, with red brick exterior and entrance porticoes with Corinthian columns.

The Terraces were designed by the Boston architectural firm of Fehmer & Page for the developer, Eugene Knapp, who had seen developments involving condominium ownership in England, and sought to recreate them here. He purchased land from the Henry Whitney (the principal developer of Beacon Street, and oversaw this development, which included (in addition to the row houses), a park, stables, casino (playhouse), and playground. Of his original development, only the row houses survive, the remaining land having been redeveloped into other uses. The development was an immediate success, attracting some high-profile residents, including William Shreve of Shreve, Crump & Low. Knapp was financially overextended by the development, and eventually sold his interest back to Whitney.

== See also ==
- National Register of Historic Places listings in Brookline, Massachusetts
