= Thomas W. Osborn =

American Union army officer and senator for Florida (1833–1898)

Thomas Ward Osborn
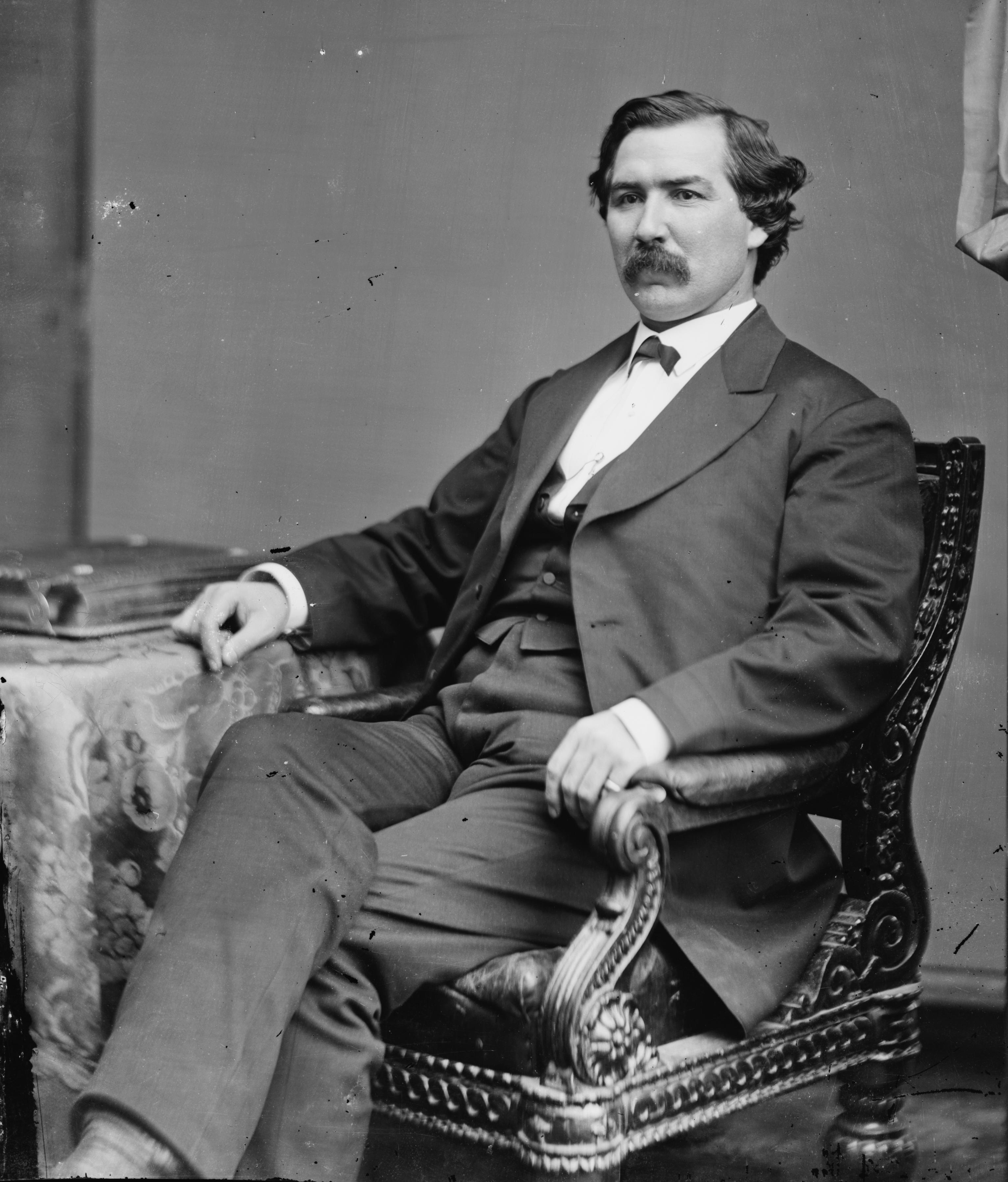
- Osborn (c. 1860–1875)

United States Senator from Florida
- In office June 25, 1868 – March 3, 1873
- Preceded by: David L. Yulee
- Succeeded by: Simon B. Conover

Member of the Florida Senate

Personal details
- Born: March 9, 1833 Scotch Plains, New Jersey, U.S.
- Died: December 18, 1898 (aged 65) New York City, New York, U.S.
- Party: Republican

Thomas Ward Osborn (March 9, 1833 – December 18, 1898) was a Union Army officer, freedmen bureau official, 1868 Florida Constitutional Convention delegate, state senator, and United States senator representing Florida.

== Early life ==
Osborn was born in Scotch Plains, New Jersey, the son of John and Amelia Osborn. He and his family moved to North Wilna, New York in 1842 where he worked on the family farm until 1854. In 1854, Osborn took college preparatory courses and, in 1860, he graduated from Madison University (now Colgate University) of Hamilton, New York.

After graduating, Osborn worked in a law office in Watertown, New York and was admitted to the New York bar association in 1861.

== Military service ==
With the American Civil War looming, Osborn did not practice law for long. After the First Battle of Bull Run in 1861, he entered the Union Army as lieutenant. From his home in Jefferson County, New York, Osborn raised a company for light artillery service which became known as Company (or Battery) D, First Regiment, New York Light Artillery.

Osborn's company served with the Army of the Potomac earning high marks and he was promoted to captain, major and colonel. As major, Osborn served under Major General Oliver O. Howard in the XI Corps leading in exemplary fashion (although the XI Corps was routed in both the Battle of Chancellorsville and Battle of Gettysburg). Osborn commanded the corps' artillery brigade at Gettysburg, and he was involved in the defense of Cemetery Hill on July 2, 1863, when the position was attacked by troops of Maj. Gen. Jubal Early.

Osborn transferred to the Western theater with Howard. He served as inspector general when Howard became commander of the Army of the Tennessee. He left a detailed account of Maj. Gen. William T. Sherman's March to the Sea.

== Reconstruction and politics ==
After Osborn's military service ended, he was appointed assistant commissioner for the Bureau of Refugees, Freedmen and Abandoned Lands as part of Reconstruction in Florida in 1865 and 1866. He also practiced law while living in Tallahassee, Florida.

Osborn was a member of the State constitutional convention which created The 1868 Florida Constitution. He then moved to Pensacola, Florida and was elected to the Florida Senate.

Shortly thereafter, Florida was reinstated to the U.S. Congress. While still only in his mid-30s, Osborn was elected to the United States Senate as a Republican and served from 1868 to 1873. He is credited with being instrumental in passing legislation to complete construction of the Washington Monument (which had been halted since before the Civil War).

== Retirement ==
Osborn did not run for reelection in 1872. He served as the U.S. commissioner at the Centennial Exposition in Philadelphia, Pennsylvania in 1876, the first official world's fair in the United States.

In his retirement, Osborn engaged in law and literature in New York City where he died in 1898. Thomas Osborn is interred at Hillside Cemetery in North Adams, Massachusetts.

== See also ==
- List of United States senators from Florida
- Florida's congressional delegations

U.S. Senate
Preceded by vacant^{1}	U.S. senator (Class 3) from Florida; 1868–1873; Served alongside: Adonijah S. Welch, Abijah Gilbert	Succeeded by Simon B. Conover
Notes and references
1. Because Florida seceded from the Union in 1861, seat was vacant from 1861 to 1868 when David L. Yulee withdrew from the Senate.
