= Boylston Building =

- U.S. National Register of Historic Places
- Boston Landmark
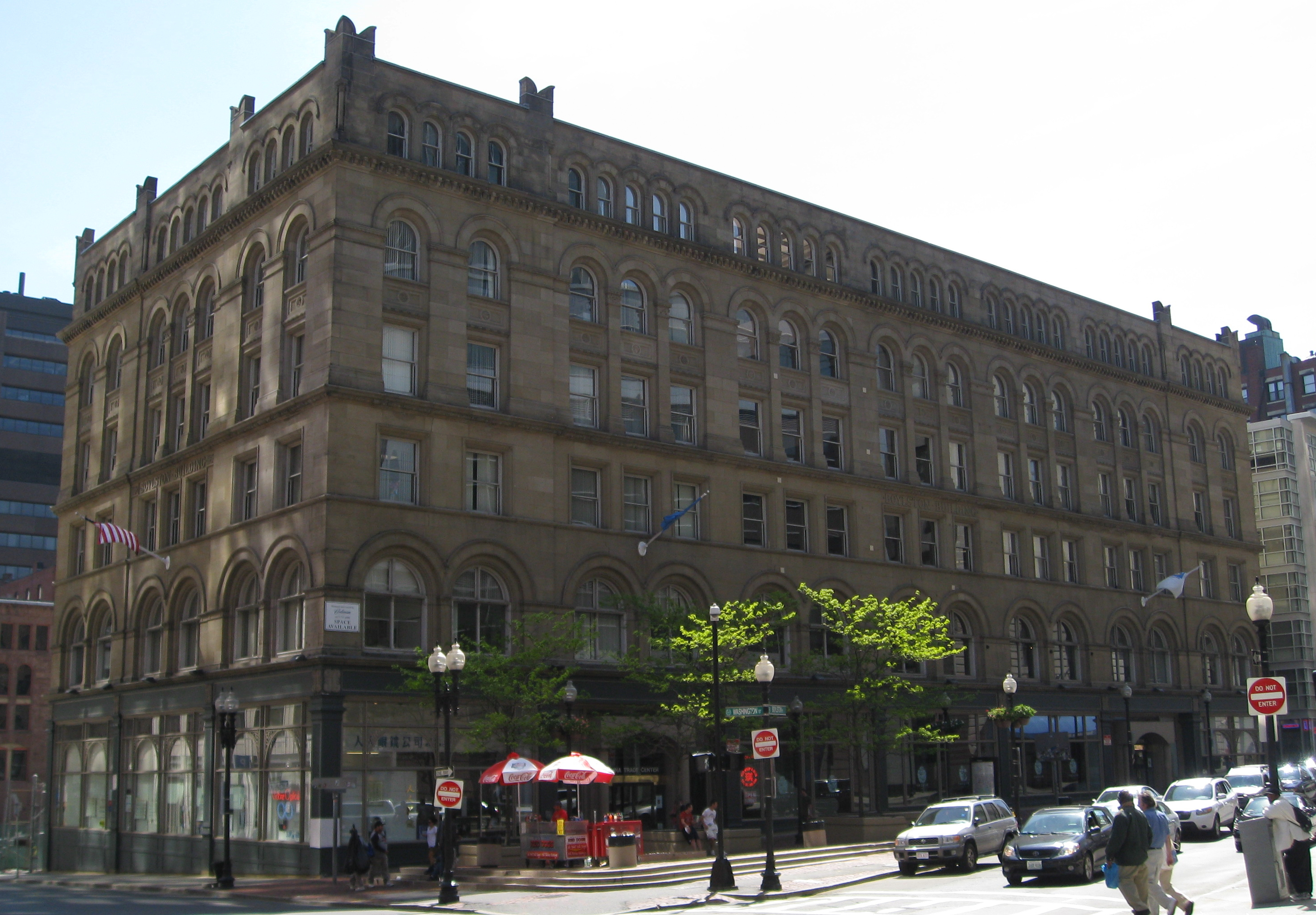

- Location within Boston Location within Massachusetts Location within the United States
- Location: Boston, Massachusetts
- Coordinates: 42°21′7.66″N 71°3′47.35″W
- Built: 1887
- Architect: Carl Fehmer; Woodbury & Leighton (builder)
- Architectural style: Chicago
- MPS: Boston Theatre MRA
- NRHP reference No.: 80000450

Significant dates
- Added to NRHP: December 9, 1980
- Designated BOSL: November 30, 1977

The Boylston Building is an historic building at 2–22 Boylston Street in Boston, Massachusetts. The six-story sandstone building was designed by Carl Fehmer and built in 1887 by Woodbury & Leighton. It is an early instance in Boston of a skeleton-built commercial structure, rather than having load-bearing masonry walls. The building housed the Boylston Market, a wholesale trading exchange which had been on the site since 1810 (in a building designed by Charles Bulfinch).

It was designated as Boston Landmark in 1977 and listed on the National Register of Historic Places in 1980.

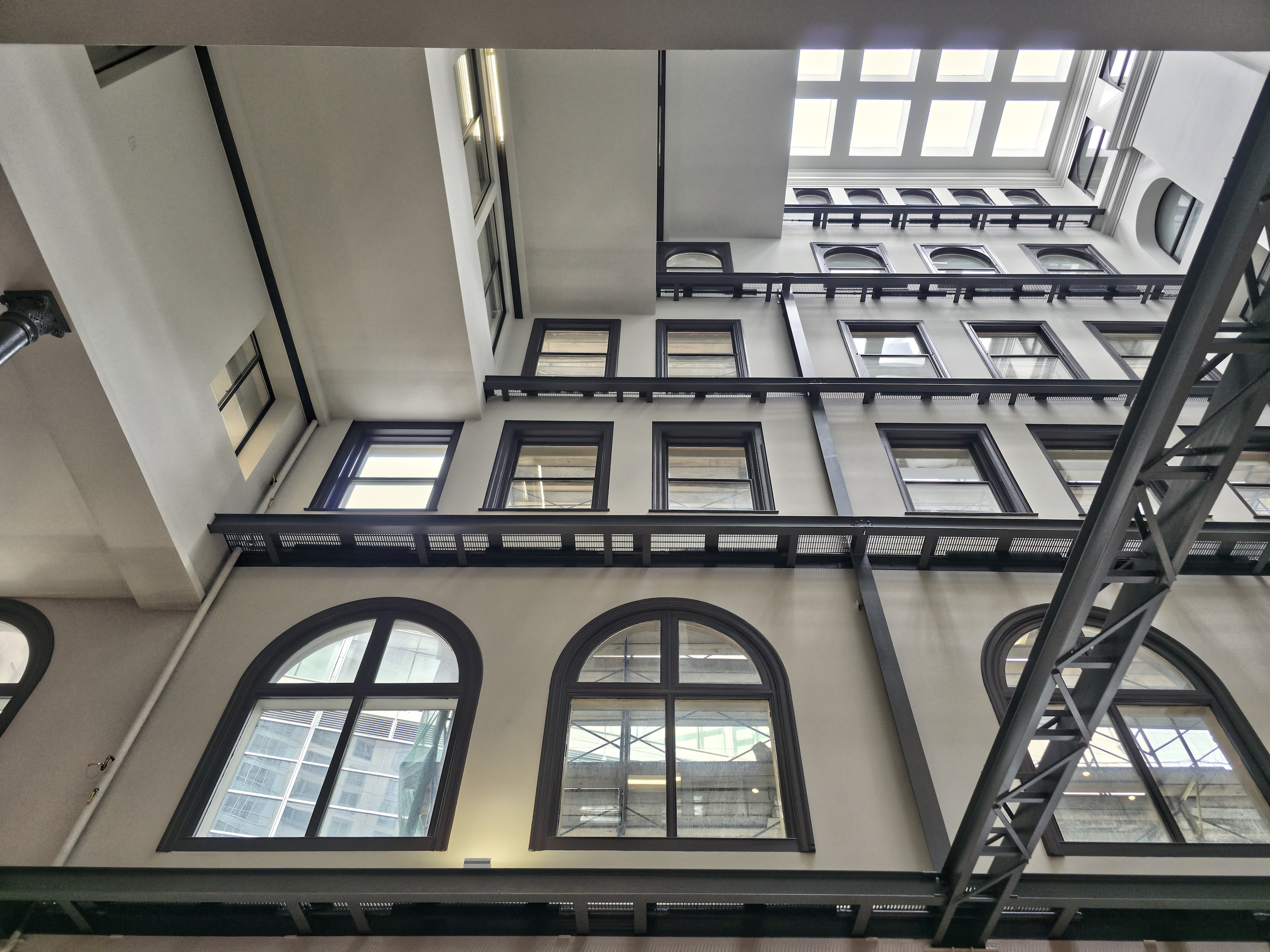
Interior Iron Skeleton

== See also ==
- National Register of Historic Places listings in northern Boston, Massachusetts
