= Saint Jude's Episcopal Church (Seal Harbor, Maine) =

Historic church in Maine, United States

- U.S. National Register of Historic Places
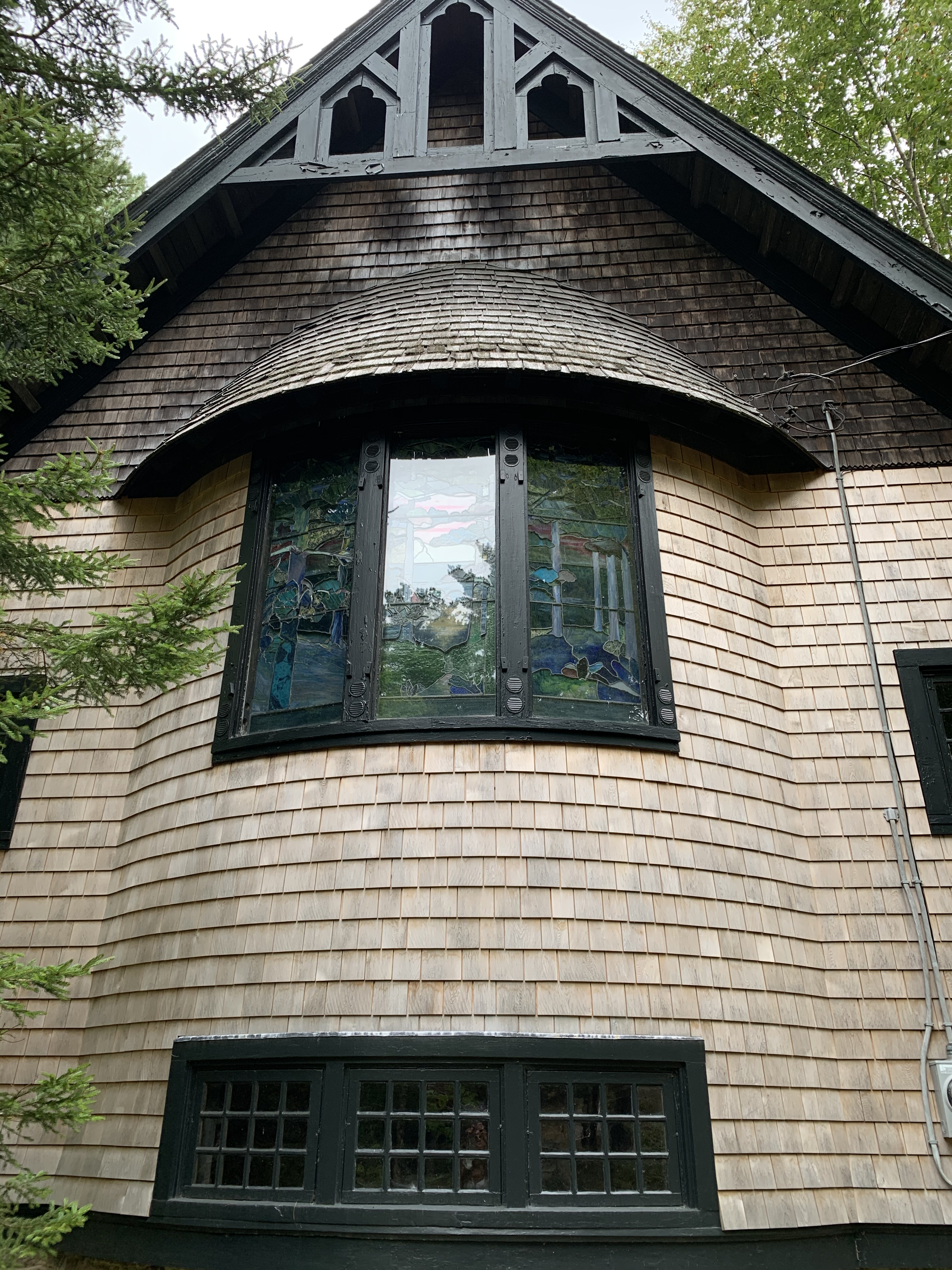

- Location within Maine Location within the United States
- Location: 277 Peabody Dr. (ME 3), Seal Harbor, Maine
- Coordinates: 44°17′38″N 68°14′48″W
- Area: 0.3 acres (0.12 ha)
- Built: 1887
- Architect: Emerson, William Ralph; Candage, Byron
- Architectural style: Shingle Style
- NRHP reference No.: 86001905
- Added to NRHP: July 24, 1986

Saint Jude's Episcopal Church is a historic church at 277 Peabody Drive (Maine State Route 3) in Seal Harbor, Maine. Built in 1887–89, this Shingle-style church is the least-altered surviving example of ecclesiastical architecture in Maine designed by the noted exponent of the style, William Ralph Emerson. Principally used as a summer chapel, it is affiliated with the Episcopal mission of St. Mary's in Northeast Harbor. The building was listed on the National Register of Historic Places in 1986.

== Description and history ==
St. Jude's is set on a wooded lot on the south side of Peabody Drive (ME 3) on a peninsula west of the village center of Seal Harbor, which is on the south side of Mount Desert Island on the central coast of Maine. It is a modest single-story wood frame structure, with a steeply pitched gable roof and wood shingle siding. The building is oriented east-west, with the nave at the eastern end and the entrance on the north side near the western end. The sides have alternating buttresses and square windows, with a single eyebrow window in the roof. The nave end has a large bowed window, and the western end features a three-part stained-glass window and decorative vergeboard in the gable. The entrance has a vestibule area with a small belfry sheltered by a rounded gable roof. Attached to the main building at the western end is the guild hall, a single-story hip-roof structure built out of similar materials. The interior of the church is relatively spare, exposing the architectural elements of the roof framing and walls. The sanctuary has two rows of movable benches for seating.

The church was designed by William Ralph Emerson, a noted proponent of the Shingle style who designed many buildings on Mount Desert Island. Of the ones that survive, only a few of them are churches, and this one is the least-altered of that group. The St. Jude's Episcopal mission was established in 1886, and the church was built in 1887–89, funded by wealthy summer residents of the area. The guild hall was added in 1931. The congregation of the church never exceeded about 200, and was eventually merged with St. Mary's in Northeast Harbor.

== See also ==
- National Register of Historic Places listings in Hancock County, Maine
