= Boston Massacre Monument =

Sculpture in Boston, Massachusetts, U.S.

- Crispus Attucks Monument, Victory
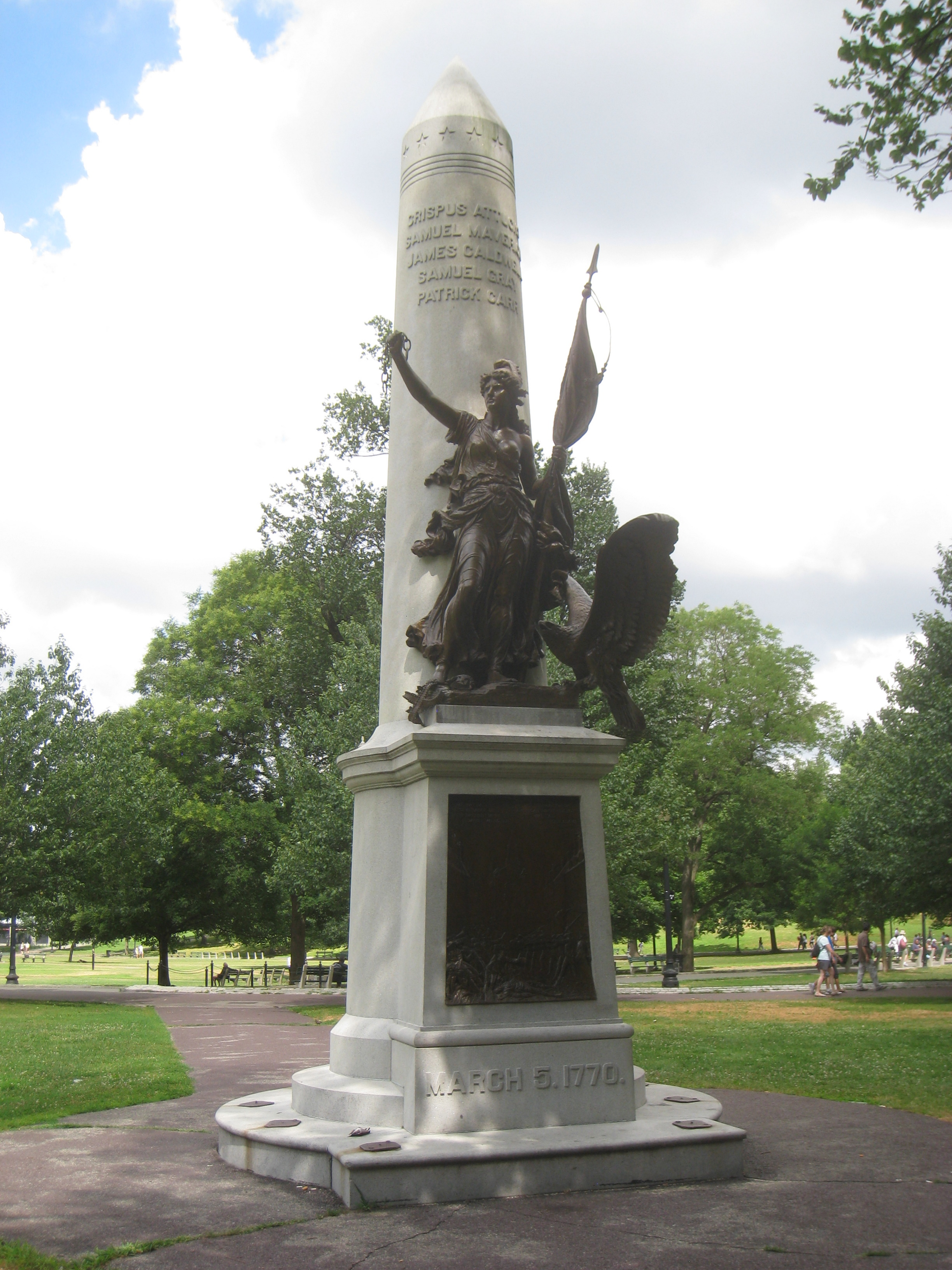
- The monument in 2010
- Artist: Adolph Robert Kraus
- Year: 1889
- Subject: Boston Massacre
- Location: Boston, Massachusetts, United States; 42.354284°N 71.064412°W

The Boston Massacre Monument, also known as the Crispus Attucks Monument and Victory, is an outdoor bronze memorial by Adolph Robert Kraus, installed in Boston Common, in Boston, Massachusetts, United States.

== Description and history ==
The monument was dedicated on November 14, 1889. The designer of the base was Boston architect Carl Fehmer.

The monument was surveyed by the Smithsonian Institution's "Save Outdoor Sculpture!" program in 1993. The survey's description says, "The monument consists of an allegorical female figure representing the Spirit of the Revolution standing atop a granite base in front of a tall granite obelisk adorned with a band of thirteen stars around the top. The female figure is loosely draped and holds a furled American flag in her proper left hand. Her proper right arm is raised and in her proper right hand she holds a broken piece of chain. Beneath her proper right foot is a broken British crown. An eagle ready to take flight is perched by her proper left foot. On the base, beneath the female figure, is a bronze relief plaque depicting the Boston Massacre. It shows five men, Crispus Attucks, Samuel Maverick, James Caldwell, Samuel Gray, and Patrick Carr, slain by the British soldiers in front of the Massachusetts State House." These deaths took place on March 5, 1770.

Crispus Attucks was a freed African American who was the first to die in the line of fire between the British and the colonist. Crispus Attucks was a part of the first group to start attacking the British soldiers with throwing balls of ice and stones at the troops. Attucks was glorified by some colonists as an emblem of resisting against the British power.
