= Adolph Robert Kraus =

American sculptor

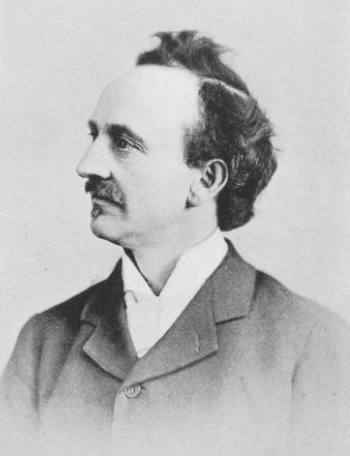
- Born: August 5, 1850; Zeulenroda, Germany
- Died: November 6, 1901 (aged 51); Danvers, Massachusetts, United States
- Occupation: Sculptor

Adolph Robert Kraus (August 5, 1850 - November 6, 1901), known professionally as Robert Kraus, was an American sculptor, born in Zeulenroda, Germany, and active in Boston.

== Biography ==
Adolph Robert Kraus was born in Zeulenroda on August 5, 1850. He began sculpting at age 14 and grew his business such that he could own his own studio. At 23 he left for Rome where he studied under Emilio Wolf. After a year of study he won the grand prize at the Italian Royal Institute for Fine Arts for his sculpture "The Puritan." For this honor, he was awarded a pension by the Prussian government by the order of Emperor William. He immigrated to the United States in 1881, and is best known for his sculpture of the Boston Massacre Monument in Boston Common, the winged Victory figures that crowned the towers of Machinery Hall in the Columbian Exposition of 1893, and the Randidge monument in Forest Hills Cemetery. The Randidge Monument features a seated figure of Grief leaning on an inverted torch resting on a sizable plinth by architect Carl Fehmer and Samuel Page.

Forest Hills Cemetery also hosts Kraus' bust of Karl Heinzen and his bronze Fame memorial on the tomb of famed restaurateur Jacob Wirth who ran his eponymous restaurant and ale house on Stuart Street in Boston.

Kraus' work also graced the 1893 Chicago World's Fair and the Massachusetts State House in the form of a marble bust of Oliver Ames.

He was hospitalized in Danvers, Massachusetts, after showing signs of mental illness while attempting to create a sculpture of Belshazzar at the moment of seeing the handwriting on the wall. He died there on November 6, 1901. At his death, he left behind a wife and six children at his house at 90 Hyde Park Avenue in Clarendon Hills.

== Gallery ==
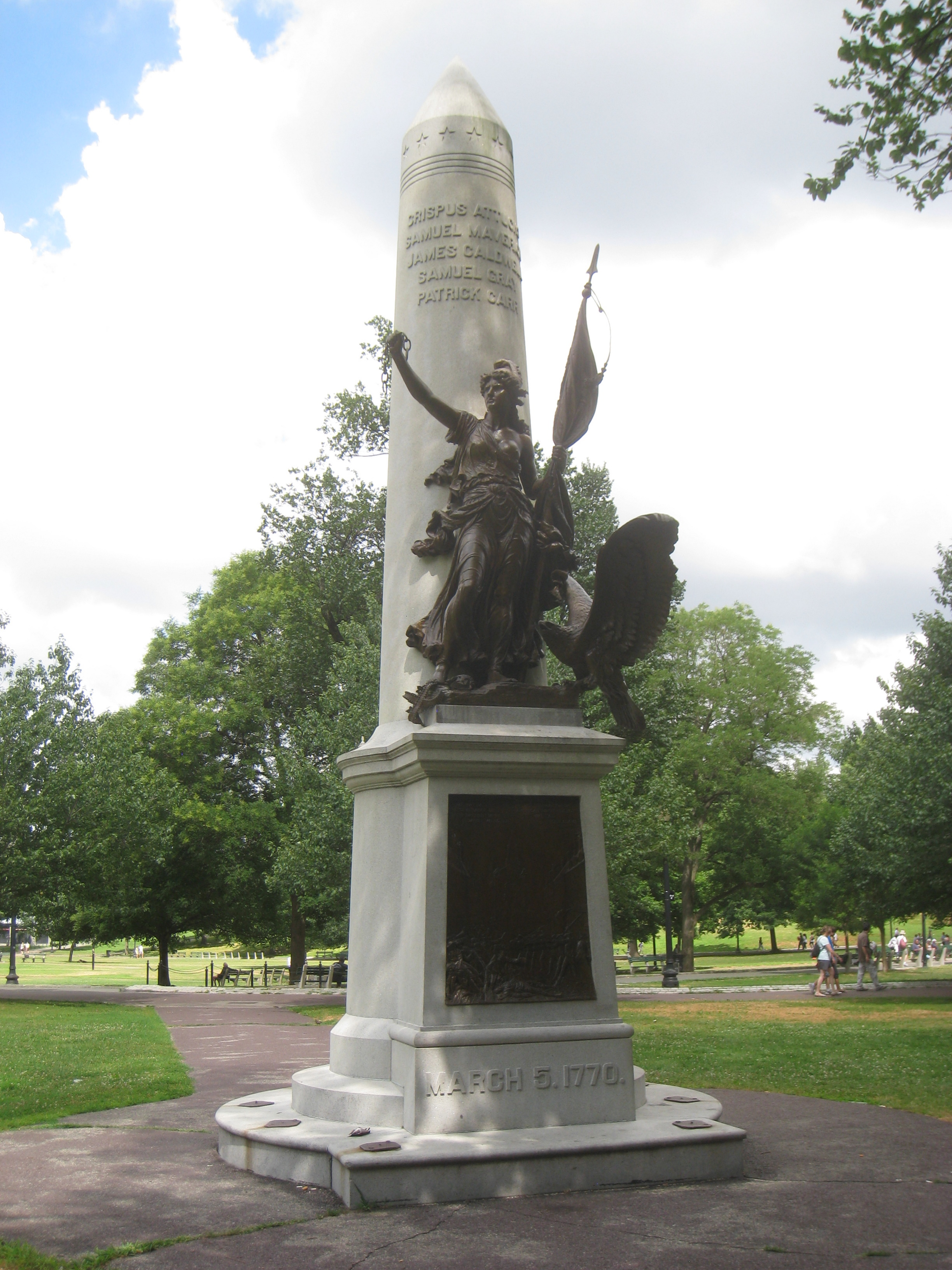
Massacre memorial on the Boston Common

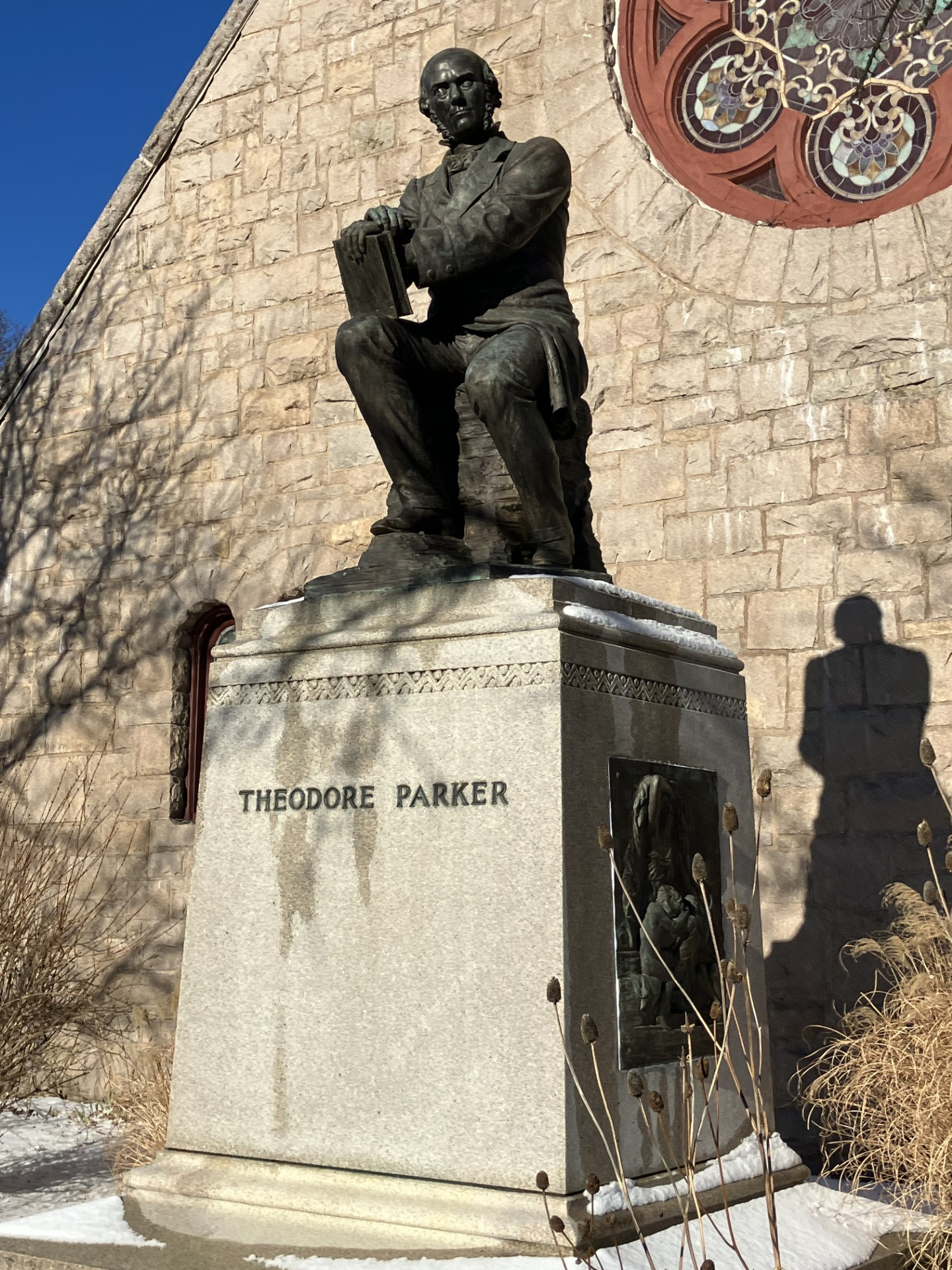
Theodore Parker was a prominent Boston abolitionist and Minister whose thoughts were paraphrased in speeches by Abraham Lincoln and Martin Luther King.

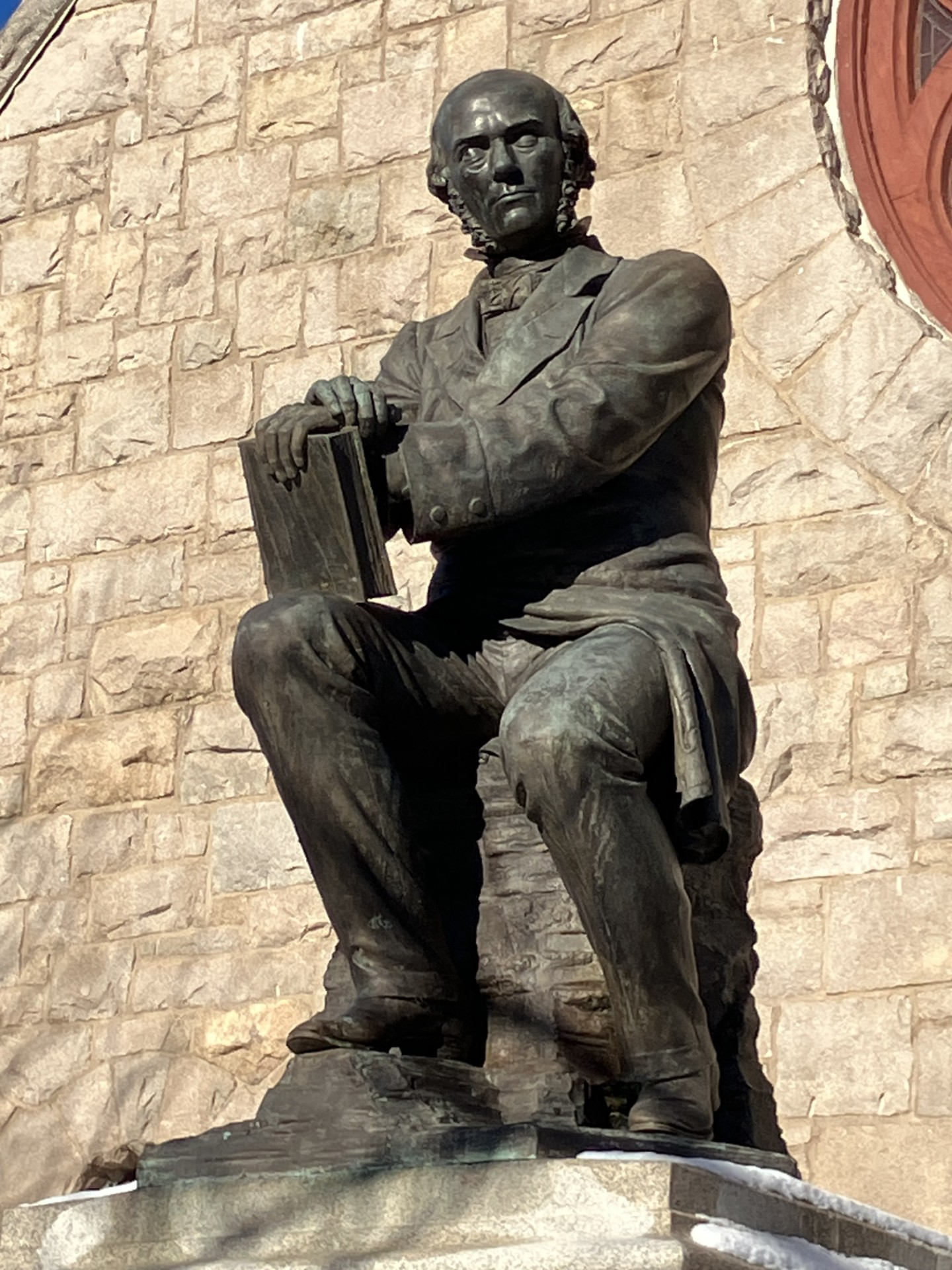
Theodore Parker Sculpture in Jamaica Plain Boston Massachusetts stands outside the Theodore Parker Church

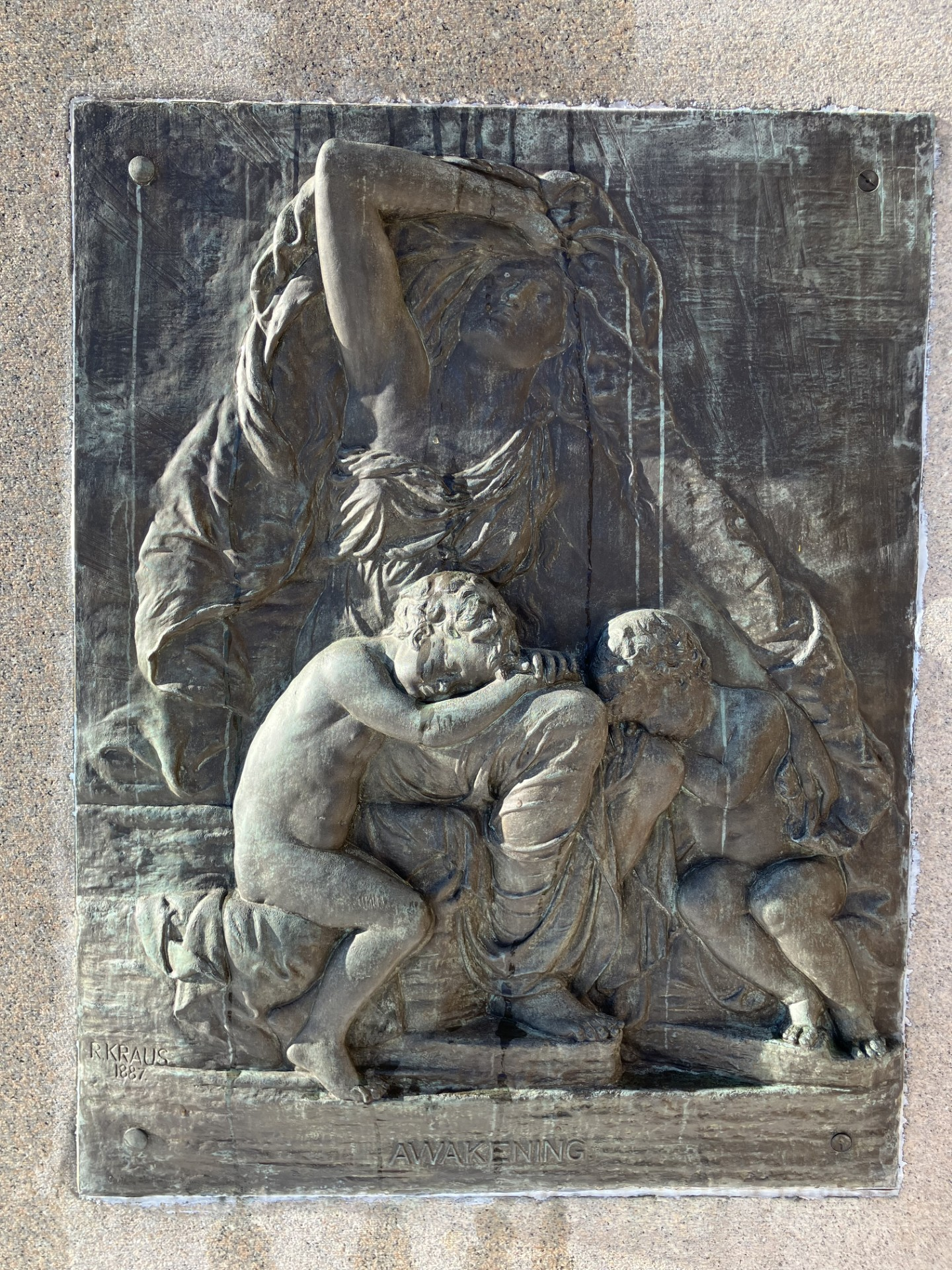
Awakening Plaque on the plinth of the Theodore Parker Sculpture

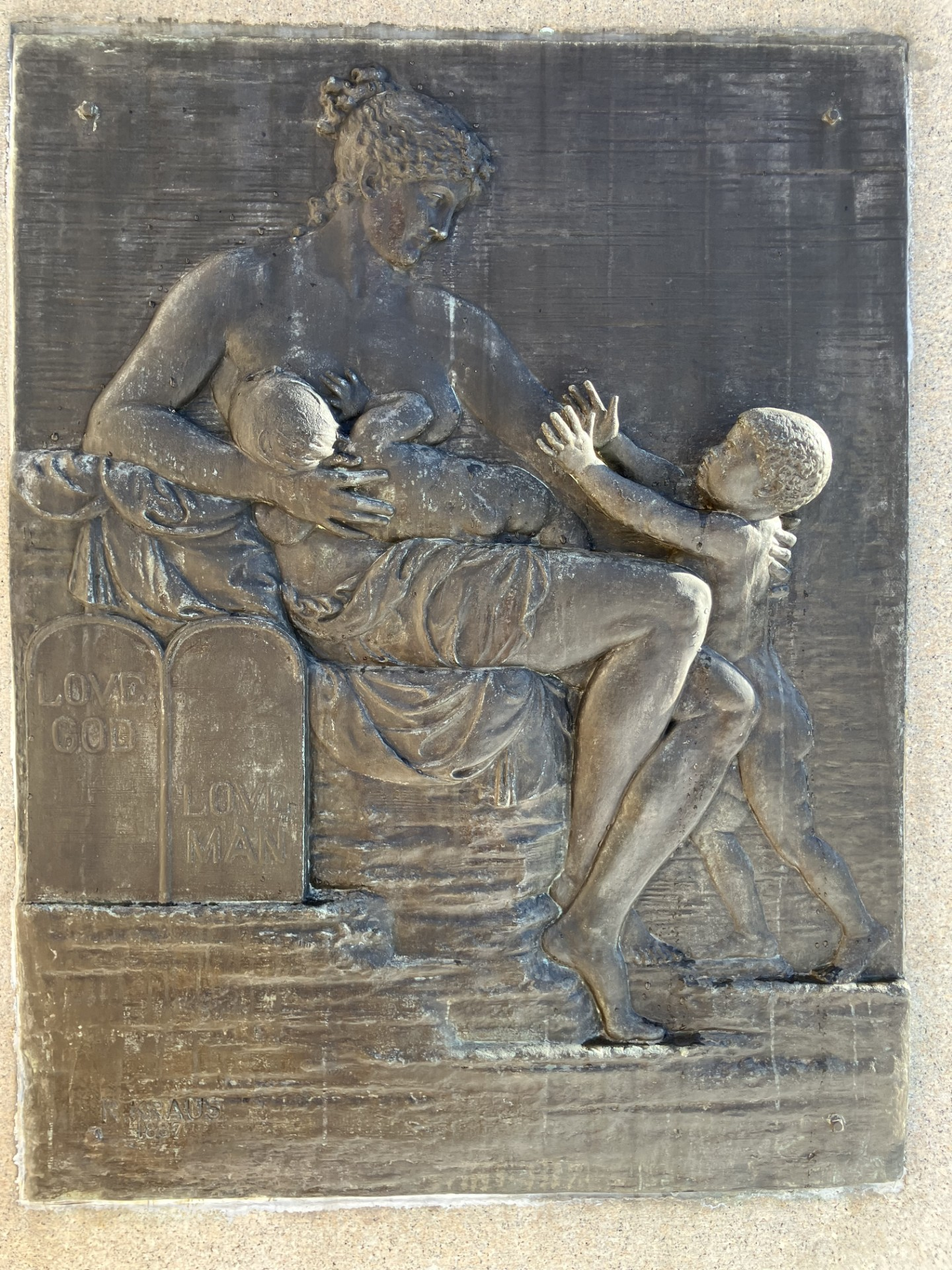
Love God, Love Man Bas Relief Plaque on the plinth of the Theodore Parker Sculpture
