= William King Covell III House =

Historic house in Rhode Island, United States

- U.S. National Register of Historic Places
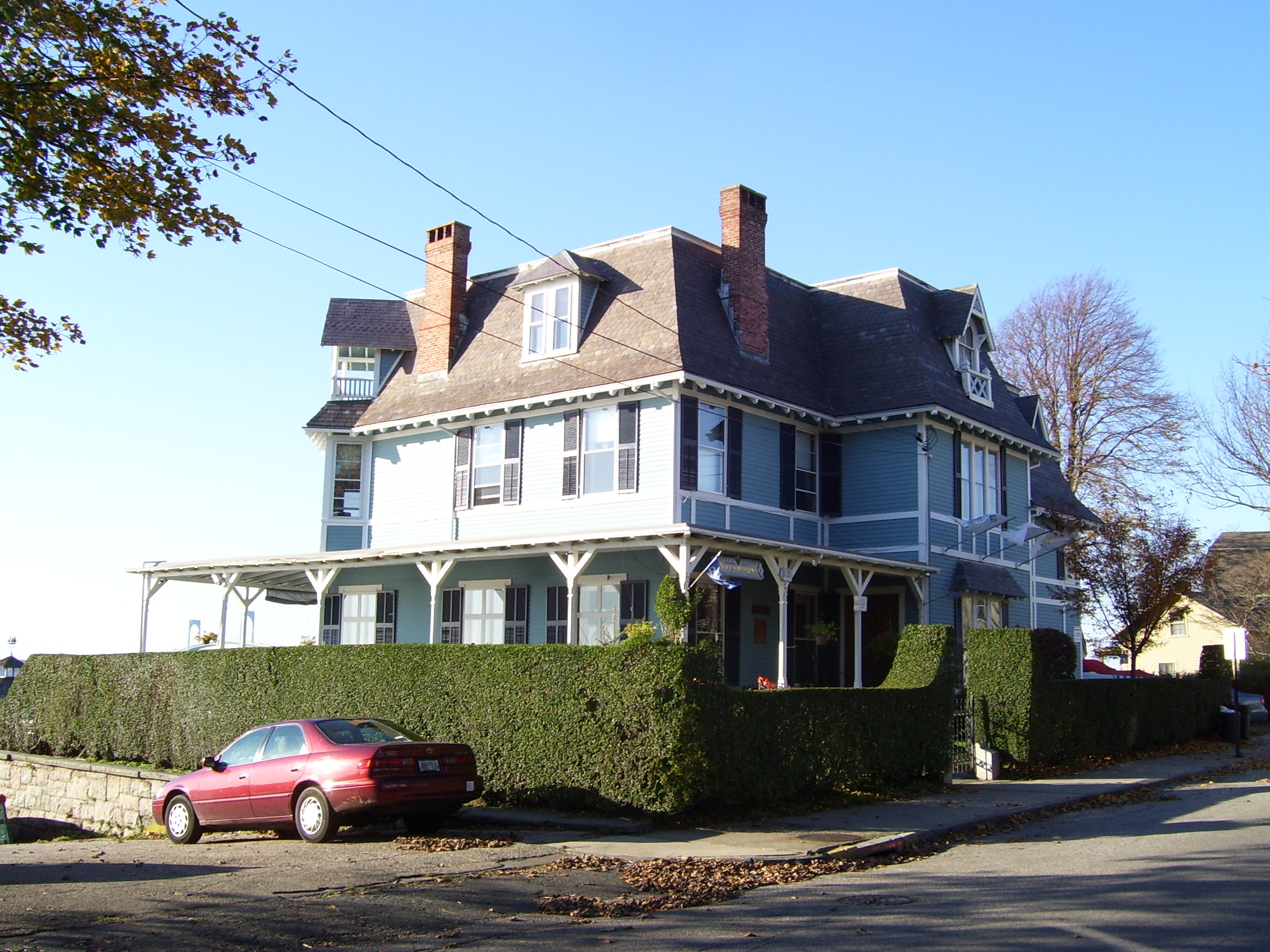

- Location within Rhode Island Location within the United States
- Location: Newport, Rhode Island
- Coordinates: 41°29′39″N 71°19′19″W
- Built: 1870
- Architect: Emerson & Fehmer; A. A. Low & Co.
- Architectural style: Stick/Eastlake
- NRHP reference No.: 72000027
- Added to NRHP: May 31, 1972

The William King Covell III House, originally Villa Edna but now known as the Sanford-Covell Villa Marina, is an historic house at 72 Washington Street in Newport, Rhode Island.

== Construction ==
The house is a 2 1/2-story wood-frame structure, with a mansard roof and restrained Second Empire styling. It was designed by Emerson & Fehmer of Boston, and built in 1870 for M. H. Sanford as a summer residence. Its interior, in marked contrast to its exterior, is lavishly decorated with woodwork and stencilwork.

== Ownership by William King Covell II and his descendants ==
William King Covell II bought the house in 1896 and it has remained in his family until this day. It is currently owned by Anne Ramsey Cuvelier, the great granddaughter of William King Covell II, who uses it for a bed and breakfast business.

== Lizzie Borden as a houseguest ==
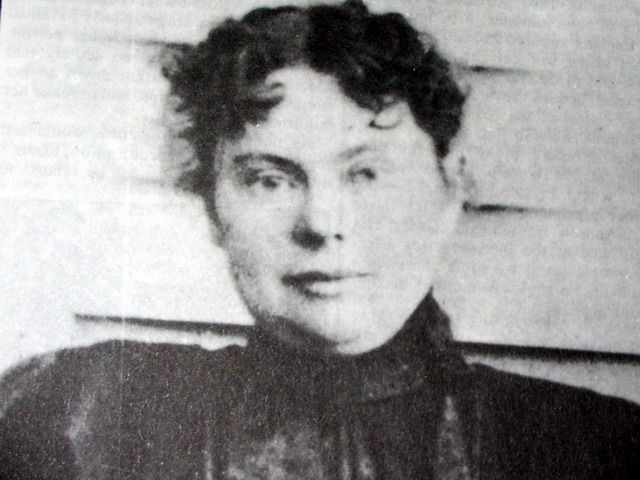
Lizzie Borden at the house in 1893

Lizzie Borden, a family friend who stood trial for murder, stayed with the Covell family after her acquittal in the summer of 1893. She stayed at the winter home of the Covell family on Farewell Street where the famous photo of her on the porch was taken. It is assumed that she also spent some time at 72 Washington Street.

== National Register of Historic Places ==
The house was listed on the National Register of Historic Places in 1979.

== See also ==
- National Register of Historic Places listings in Newport County, Rhode Island
