= St. Mary's-By-The-Sea (Northeast Harbor, Maine) =

Historic church in Maine, United States

- U.S. National Register of Historic Places
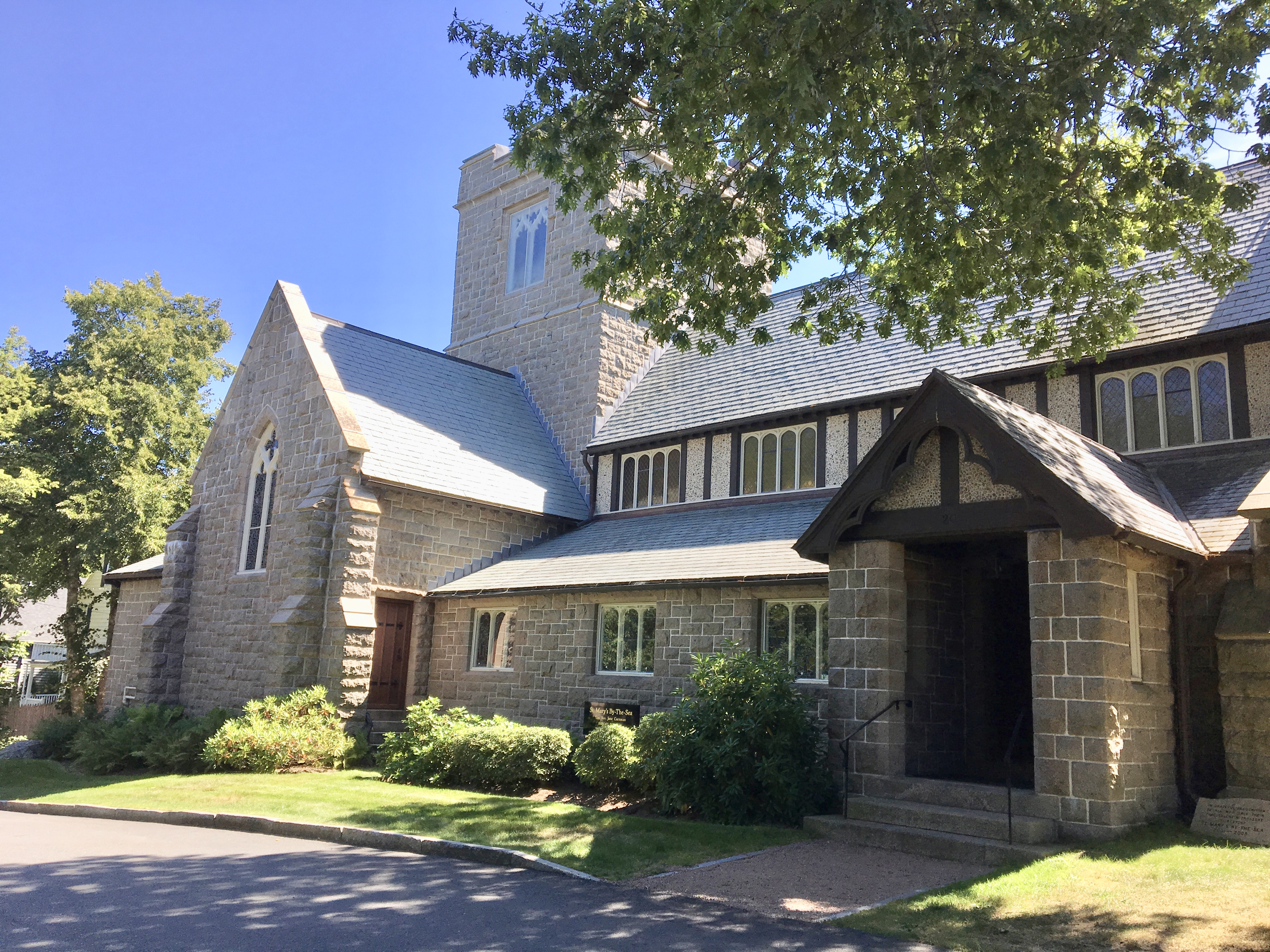

- Location within Maine Location within the United States
- Location: 20 S. Shore Rd., Northeast Harbor, Maine
- Coordinates: 44°17′19″N 68°17′9″W
- Area: less than one acre
- Built: 1902
- Architect: Henry Vaughan
- Architectural style: Late Gothic Revival
- NRHP reference No.: 00000761
- Added to NRHP: July 5, 2000

St. Mary's-By-The-Sea is a historic Gothic Revival church at 20 South Shore Road in Northeast Harbor, Maine. Designed by English architect Henry Vaughan and built in 1902, it is one of a number of architect-designed summer chapels built around the turn of the 20th century with funding from wealthy summer residents. The building was listed on the National Register of Historic Places in 2000. Its parish is also responsible for services at Saint Jude's Episcopal Church, another National Register-listed chapel in Seal Harbor.

== Description and history ==
St. Mary's is set on the south side of South Shore Road, directly opposite its junction with Kimball Road. It is a cruciform structure, built of stone and stucco, with the long axis set parallel to the road. It has classic Late Gothic features, including buttresses along the nave and at the corners of the transepts, and a crenellated central tower at the crossing point. The nave features a raised roof section with Gothic-arched clerestory windows. The church features a number of stained-glass windows, some of which may predate its construction.

The church is one of three in Maine known to be the work of English architect Henry Vaughan, and is the only one executed in stone. It was built in 1902 to replace an earlier chapel which the summer congregation had outgrown. It was built in part using granite quarried from a roadbed that the community had concluded needed to be lowered. Funding was raised by subscription from the congregation, which was then composed mainly of wealthy summer residents.

== See also ==
- National Register of Historic Places listings in Hancock County, Maine
