= Gilbertsville Historic District =

Historic district in New York, United States

- U.S. National Register of Historic Places
- U.S. Historic district
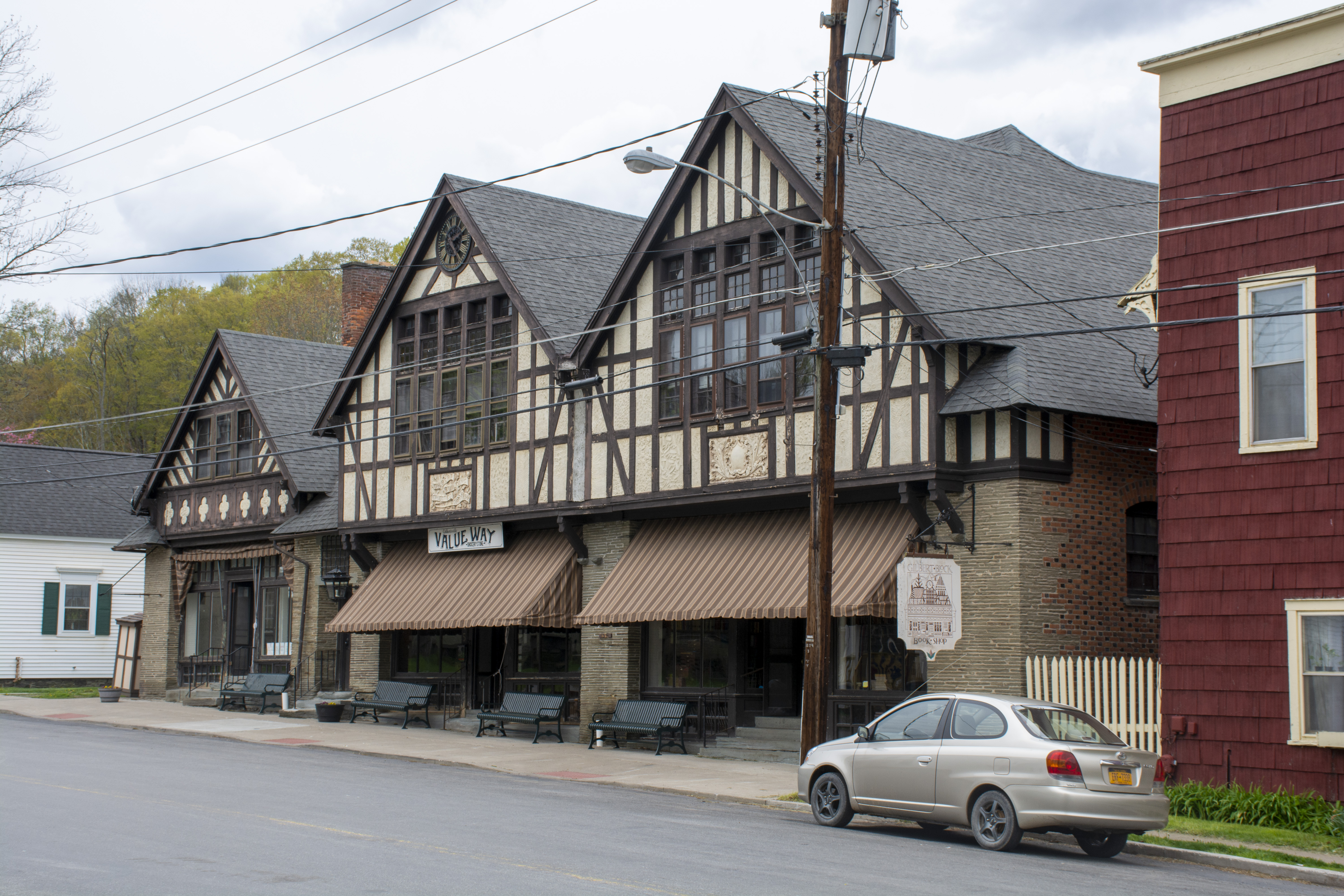

- Location within New York Location within the United States
- Location: Roughly bounded by Marion Ave., Cliff and Green Sts., Grover and Sylvan Sts., (original); later extended to roughly the incorporated village boundary, (increase), Gilbertsville, New York
- Coordinates: 42°28′16″N 75°19′38″W
- Architectural style: Greek Revival, Federal, Italianate
- NRHP reference No.: 74001293 and 82001232
- Added to NRHP: May 17, 1974 (original); November 4, 1982 (increase)

Gilbertsville Historic District is a national historic district in Gilbertsville, New York. It was listed on the National Register of Historic Places in 1974. Its boundaries were increased to approximately the incorporated village borders in 1982.
