= BankBoston =

Bank in Massachusetts, US; bought out

BankBoston Corporation
- Industry: Bank holding company
- Predecessor: Bank of Boston; BayBank
- Founded: February 7, 1784; 242 years ago (as Massachusetts Bank)
- Defunct: October 1, 1999
- Successor: FleetBoston Financial
- Headquarters: Boston, Massachusetts, United States
- Products: Financial services

BankBoston was an American bank based in Boston, Massachusetts, which was created by the 1996 merger of Bank of Boston and BayBank. One of its predecessor banks started in 1784, but the merged BankBoston was short-lived, being acquired by FleetBoston Financial in 1999. In 2005, FleetBoston was purchased by, and merged into, Bank of America of Charlotte, North Carolina.

After the sale of its Latin American branches in 2006, BankBoston currently exists solely as a subsidiary private bank owned by Bank of America.

== History ==
The history of BankBoston represents the combination of dozens of banks throughout the New England region acquired over the course of more than two centuries. Among its notable predecessors were the Massachusetts Bank, the First National Bank of Boston, the Old Colony Trust Company and BayBank.

=== The Massachusetts Bank ===
Bank of Boston traced its roots back to The Massachusetts Bank founded in 1784. The Massachusetts Bank was the first federally chartered joint-stock owned bank in the United States and only the second bank to receive a charter in the United States, after the Bank of North America. The bank's charter was signed by John Hancock and among its early account holders were such notable figures as Paul Revere, Samuel Adams, John Hancock and Henry Knox. The bank's founders were largely made up of merchants who wanted to use a U.S., rather than British bank to send money abroad. It was first headquartered at the old Manufactory House, near Boston Common. The bank was the only bank in the city of Boston until the Union Bank (later the Bank of New England) was founded in 1792.

In 1786, the Massachusetts Bank financed the first U.S. trade mission to China, and in 1791, it financed the first voyage of an American ship to Argentina, establishing what would become a long-standing presence in Latin America. Bank of Boston would later become the largest foreign bank in several major Latin American cities.

In 1864, The Massachusetts Bank was renamed the Massachusetts National Bank.

=== First National Bank of Boston ===
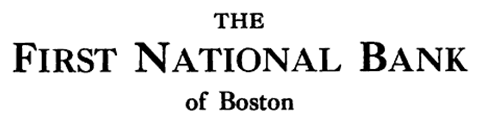
First National Bank of Boston logo, c. 1921

Bank of Boston logo, c. 1982

In 1903, The Massachusetts Bank merged with The First National Bank of Boston amidst a wave of consolidation in the banking industry at the start of the 20th century. First National had been founded in 1859 as Safety Fund Bank, changing its name in 1864 when it joined the national bank system. After a year operating as The Massachusetts First National Bank of Boston, the combined firm dropped the usage of "Massachusetts" in the name.

On December 24, 1927, Bank of Boston's headquarters in Buenos Aires, Argentina, were blown up by the Italian anarchist Severino Di Giovanni, in the frame of the international campaign supporting Sacco and Vanzetti. Despite the Wall Street crash of 1929, the First National Bank of Boston continued to grow in 1929, purchasing the Old Colony Trust Company. However, following the passage of the Glass–Steagall legislation in 1933, which prohibited commercial banks from engaging in investment banking and securities dealing, First National Bank of Boston was forced to divest its investment banking arm, the First Boston Corporation.

In 1970 the Bank of Boston reorganized under a new holding company, First National Boston Corporation, and began a series of acquisitions of regional banks through the 1970s and 1980s. In 1978, the bank challenged a Massachusetts law limiting bank contributions to political issues. The U.S. Supreme Court sided with the bank that their First Amendment rights were being restricted, in First National Bank of Boston v. Bellotti. In 1982, the bank renamed itself Bank of Boston. In 1985 Bank of Boston acquired Connecticut-based Colonial Bancorp and in 1987 acquired BankVermont Corporation.

=== Acquisition of BayBank to form BankBoston ===
By the 1990s, Bank of Boston was looking to make another large acquisition, hoping to make itself too rich to be acquired by a much larger player. However, the bank lost the bidding in 1991 for the failed Bank of New England to Fleet Bank, and its attempted merger with Shawmut Bank collapsed in early 1992. In 1994, Bank of Boston entered into discussions with Fleet about a potential merger but ultimately Fleet chose to merge with Shawmut in 1995. This merger made Fleet the largest bank in Boston and New England.

In 1995, Bank of Boston announced a merger with BayBank, another local financial institution. Although still smaller than its failed takeover targets earlier in the decade, BayBank had a strong retail banking operation, with 205 branches and over a thousand ATMs. Baybanks was founded in 1928 when a Massachusetts asset manager with controlling stakes in nine banks reorganized itself as Old Colony Trust. After successfully weathering the Great Depression, Old Colony Trust changed its name to Baystate Corporation. This reflected the widening scope of operations and services the firm provided throughout Massachusetts. In the 1950s and 1960s, Baystate engaged in an aggressive acquisitions strategy and bought more than 40 banks. In 1976 the bank's name was changed from Baystate to BayBanks, Inc. BayBanks derived 80 percent of its revenues from its retail business, with 31% of households in eastern Massachusetts, and 25% across the entire state, having at least one BayBanks account.

Following the merger, the combined Bank of Boston did regain the title as the largest bank in the city of Boston from its rival Fleet Bank although Fleet was still the larger bank overall. With the addition of BayBank's $11 billion of assets, the combined bank had total assets of over $62 billion at the end of 1996.

The combined bank, rebranded BankBoston in 1996, was a major financial institution both domestically and internationally, due in part to the Latin American holdings of Bank of Boston, where the old name was still used. Nonetheless, it would soon be subsumed by one of the many U.S. bank mergers that proliferated in the 1990s.

In August 1998 BankBoston acquired Robertson Stephens from BankAmerica Corporation for approximately $800 million. The transaction represented the second largest acquisition in company history, after the purchase of BayBank.

=== Bank of New York ===
On 26 October 1999, Bank of New York gained BankBoston Panama as its subcustodian bank in Panama. Beginning in 1996, the 1973 established BankBoston Panama provided custody services to non-resident investors in Panama.

=== Merger with Fleet ===
Boston-based Fleet Bank (originally Providence Bank, founded in Rhode Island in 1791) acquired BankBoston in 1999, on the heels of acquiring Shawmut Bank just a few years earlier. Fleet now dominated the New England market, yet saw the value in maintaining the old Bank of Boston brand in Latin America.

The combination of Fleet and BankBoston resulted in what was the eighth largest bank in the United States at the time, with assets of over $190 billion. Between the acquisitions by Fleet and BankBoston, the combined bank had consumed eight of the ten largest banks in New England at the start of the 1990s.

The merged entity, FleetBoston Financial, adopted BankBoston's former Boston headquarters as its own. The bank had branches throughout New England and the mid-Atlantic states. In 2000, FleetBoston acquired Summit Bancorp of Princeton, New Jersey. The acquisition of Summit, New Jersey's largest remaining bank at the time, vaulted FleetBoston into the #1 market-share position in the state of New Jersey and provided critical mass in the Philadelphia metro area.

=== Acquisition by Bank of America ===
In 2004, FleetBoston in turn was purchased by Bank of America, which was looking to expand its East Coast presence. Bank of America chose to unload Bank of Boston's historic Latin American assets (still branded as BankBoston), in order to focus on becoming one of the largest U.S. domestic banks.

On 17 December 2004, Bank of America sold its BankBoston (BKB) operations in Peru, Colombia, and Panama to the 1955 established Panamanian private equity bank Banco General. (Note: Banco General maintains offices in Costa Rica, has representative offices in Mexico, Guatemala, El Salvador, Colombia and Peru and has correspondent banking with Dresdner Bank Lateinamerika AG in Panama, Banco Latinoamericano de Exportaciones SA (BLADEX) in Panama, Bank of Nova Scotia in Panama, Chase Manhattan Bank, Bank of New York, Citibank, Colonial Bank in Miami, First Union Bank in Miami, SunTrust Bank in Miami, Bank of America in Miami, Barclays Bank PLC in Miami, Banco General (Overseas) in the Cayman Islands, HSBC Bank USA in New York, HSBC Bank PLC in Panama, and others.)

In 2006, Bank of America sold all BankBoston's Brazilian assets to Brazilian bank Banco Itaú, in exchange for Itaú shares. The BankBoston name and trademarks were not part of the transaction and, as part of the sale agreement, cannot be used by Bank of America. In August 2006, Itaú purchased BankBoston assets in Chile and Uruguay. Operations in these countries continued to use the BankBoston brand until Banco Itau completed its takeover in Chile on February 27, 2007, and in Uruguay on March 23, 2007.

In December 2006, Argentina's central bank approved Bank of America's sale of BankBoston Argentina to South Africa's Standard Bank. With the finalization of the sale on April 3, 2007, the BankBoston brand ceased to exist in any branches (in 2012 an 80% stake was sold by Standard Bank to Industrial and Commercial Bank of China).

BankBoston currently exists solely as an international private bank, a subsidiary owned by Bank of America.
