= Massachusetts Convention of Towns =

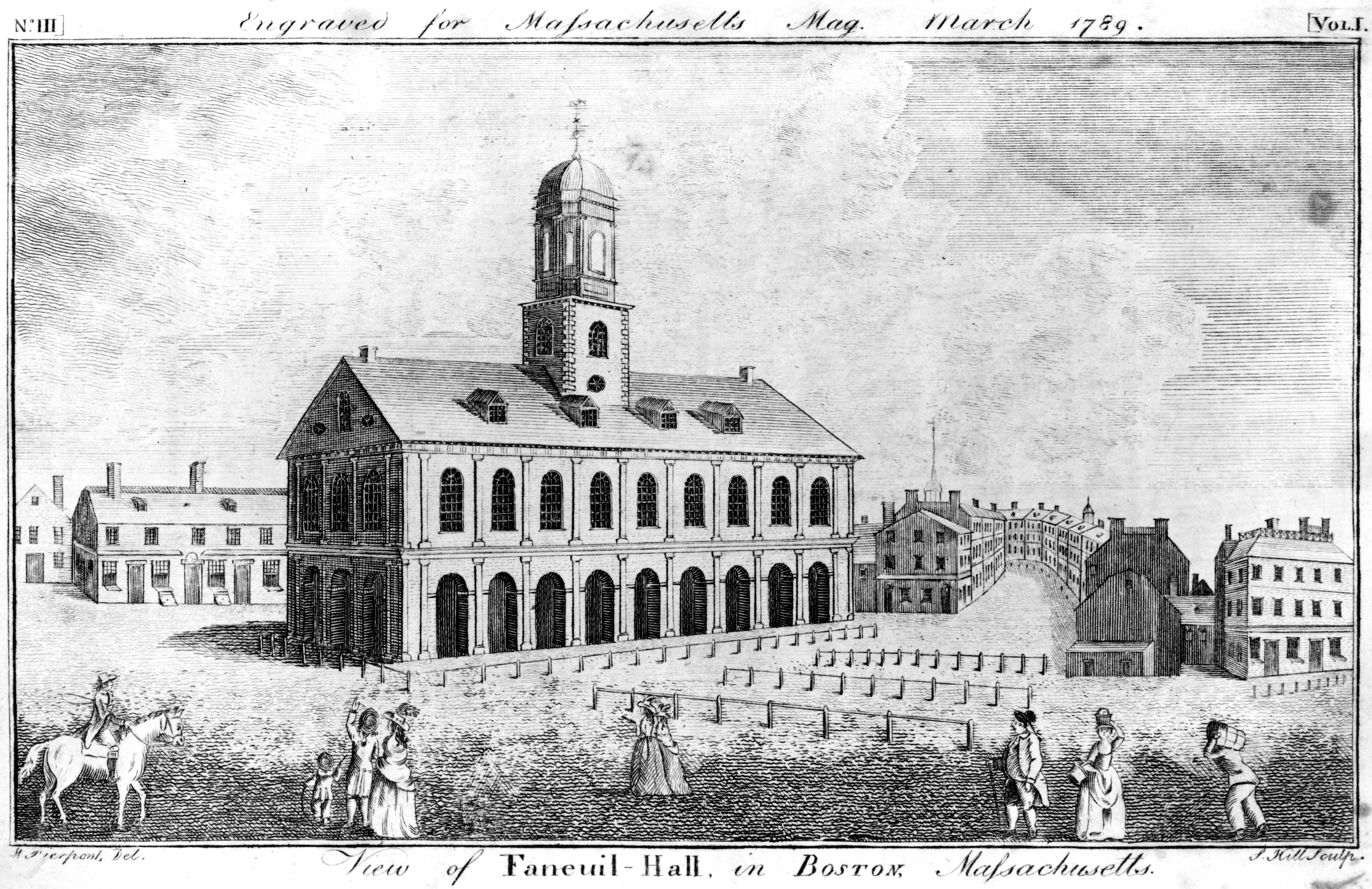

History
- Founded: 09/22/1768
- Disbanded: 09/28/1768
- Preceded by: Massachusetts General Assembly (disbanded)
- Succeeded by: Massachusetts Provincial Congress

Leadership
- Chairman: Thomas Cushing

Meeting place
- Faneuil Hall

The Massachusetts Convention of Towns (September 22–29, 1768) was an extralegal assembly held in Boston in response to the news that British troops would soon be arriving to crack down on anti-British rioting. Delegates from 96 Massachusetts towns gathered in Faneuil Hall to discuss their options. The more militant faction, led by James Otis Jr., Samuel Adams, and John Hancock, wanted to organize an armed resistance. The more conservative faction, led by convention chairman Thomas Cushing, preferred to lodge a written complaint. The conservatives won out, and the delegates endorsed a series of mild resolutions before disbanding.

== History ==
=== Background ===
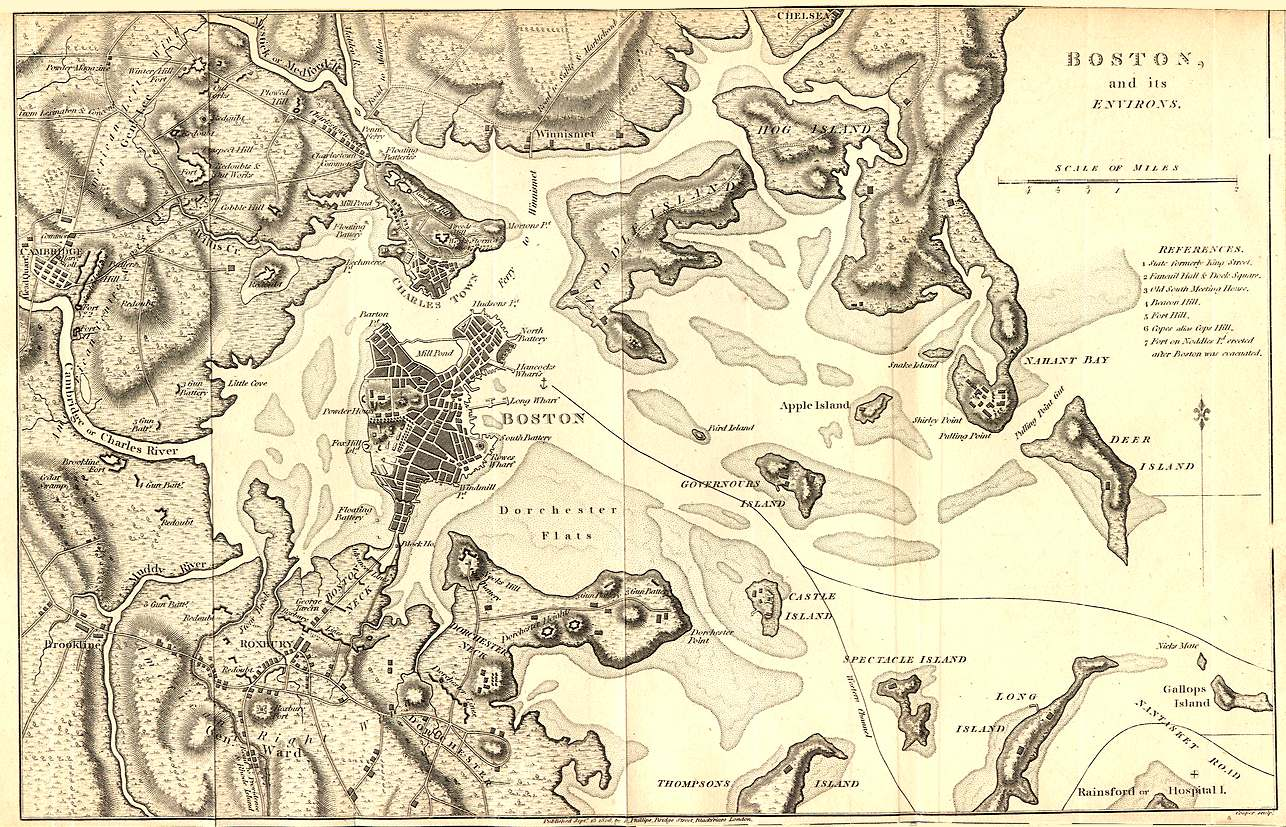
Colonial map showing Castle Island at the entrance to Boston's inner harbor

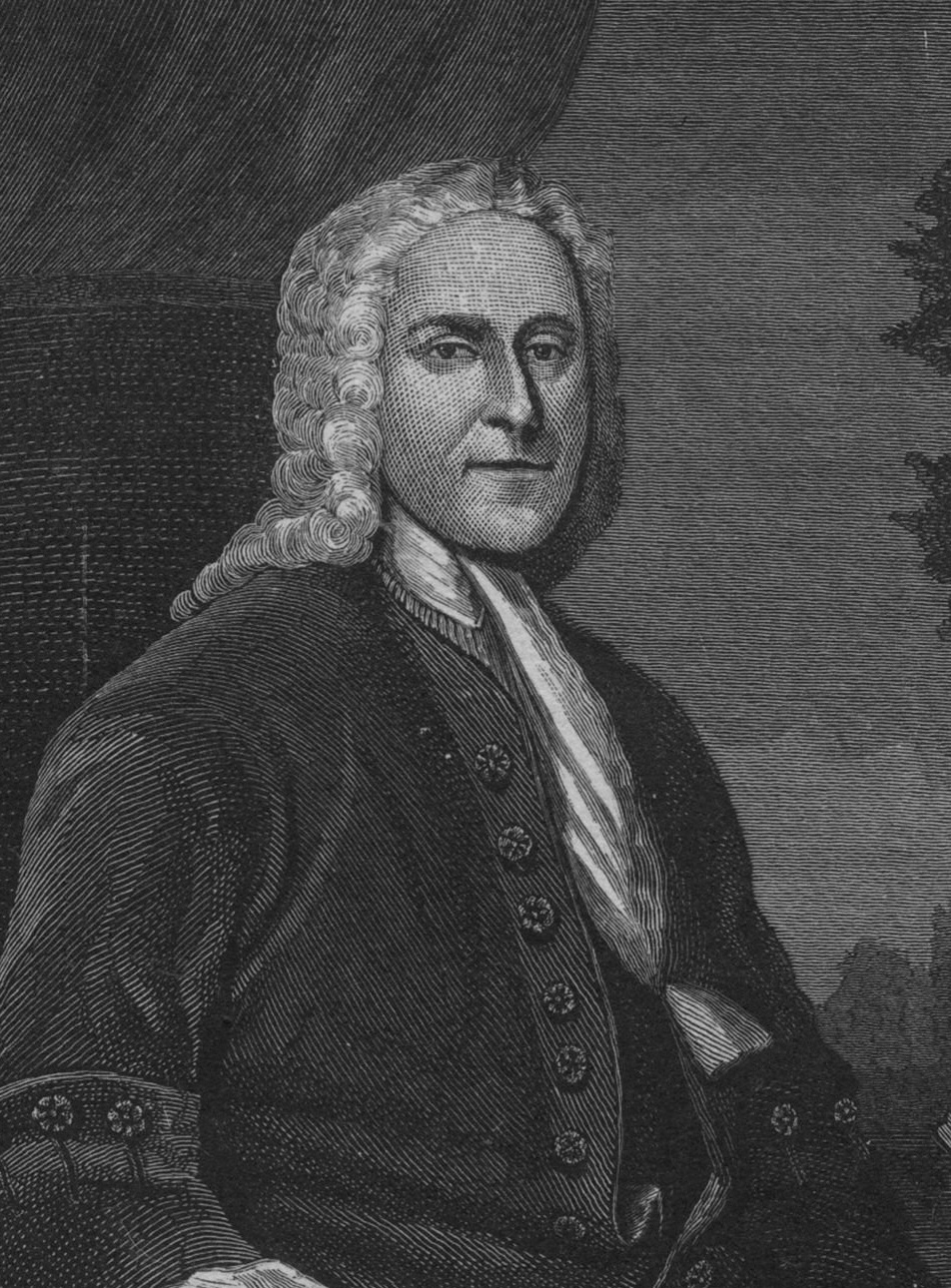
Thomas Cushing, chairman of the convention

In February 1768, the Massachusetts House of Representatives issued a circular letter denouncing the Townshend Acts and sent it to representatives of the other colonies. Lord Hillsborough, the Secretary of State for the Colonies, ordered the House to rescind the letter. When the House refused to comply, Governor Francis Bernard dissolved the Massachusetts general assembly. This led to an outbreak of mob violence from colonists who no longer had any legal way to deal with their grievances.

On June 10, when customs officers seized John Hancock's sloop, Liberty, the rioting grew so intense that the officers were forced to seek refuge at Castle William, an island fort in Boston Harbor. Governor Bernard urged the British ministry to send troops to Boston "to rescue the Government out of the hands of a trained mob." On September 3, the governor unofficially let it be known that British troops would soon be arriving.

Rumors spread that thousands of redcoats were coming to terrorize and oppress the people of Boston. Colonists feared that a standing army, garrisoned among civilians, would force them to submit to unconstitutional acts of parliament and reduce them to "the very borders of slavery." Samuel Adams declared, "We will take up arms and spend our last drop of blood before the King and Parliament shall impose on us and settle Crown Officers in this country to dragoon us." The Sons of Liberty began holding secret meetings in Boston to plan a resistance movement. Among other things, they discussed the possibility of taking over Castle William, which was not occupied by British troops but by Massachusetts militiamen. From there, they would be able to repel the British fleet as it approached the inner harbor. As one observer put it, "the Gunners could sink every ship that attempted the Castle."

=== Boston town meeting ===
Led by Samuel Adams, James Otis Jr., and Joseph Warren, Boston held a town meeting at Faneuil Hall on September 12 and 13, with Otis as moderator. A large number of Sons of Liberty were in attendance. Their first order of business was to send a message to Governor Bernard asking for the general court to be summoned immediately. When the governor denied their request, claiming he needed permission from his superiors, the discussion took on a more menacing tone.

To avoid being charged with treason, the patriots spoke on the pretext that the colonies were in imminent danger of being invaded by the French. They urged all Bostonians to arm themselves, as required by local law, with "a well fixed Firelock Musket Accoutrement and Ammunition," to be used against "the enemy" if need be. The town arms, which had been removed from storage for cleaning, were put on display in the hall. A motion to distribute them among the people right then and there was rejected as too extreme, but Otis added that "there are the Arms, when an attempt is made against your Liberties they will be delivered, our declaration wants no explanation."

The Bostonians adopted a number of resolutions asserting their rights, declaring that to garrison a standing army among them without their consent was unconstitutional, and vowing to defend not only the King, but their own rights as British subjects "at the utmost peril of their lives and fortunes." They also resolved to hold a province-wide conference starting on the 22nd, and appointed Otis, Adams, Hancock, and Thomas Cushing to the organizing committee. Soon afterwards, the selectmen sent a circular letter to the towns outlining their concerns and inviting them to send delegates to the convention. Thomas Hutchinson, then serving as lieutenant governor, wrote later that the meeting "had a greater tendency towards a revolution in government, than any preceding measures in any of the colonies."

Around the same time as the town meeting, the Sons of Liberty constructed a crude beacon out of a turpentine barrel and mounted it on a pole on Beacon Hill. The plan was to light the beacon as soon as the British warships were spotted, as a signal to Massachusetts residents from further inland that it was time to march to Boston and "destroy every Soldier that dares put his Foot on Shore." The selectmen were ordered to take the beacon down; when they refused, the sheriff removed it. On September 19, Governor Bernard officially announced that several regiments from Halifax and Ireland were on their way.

=== The convention ===
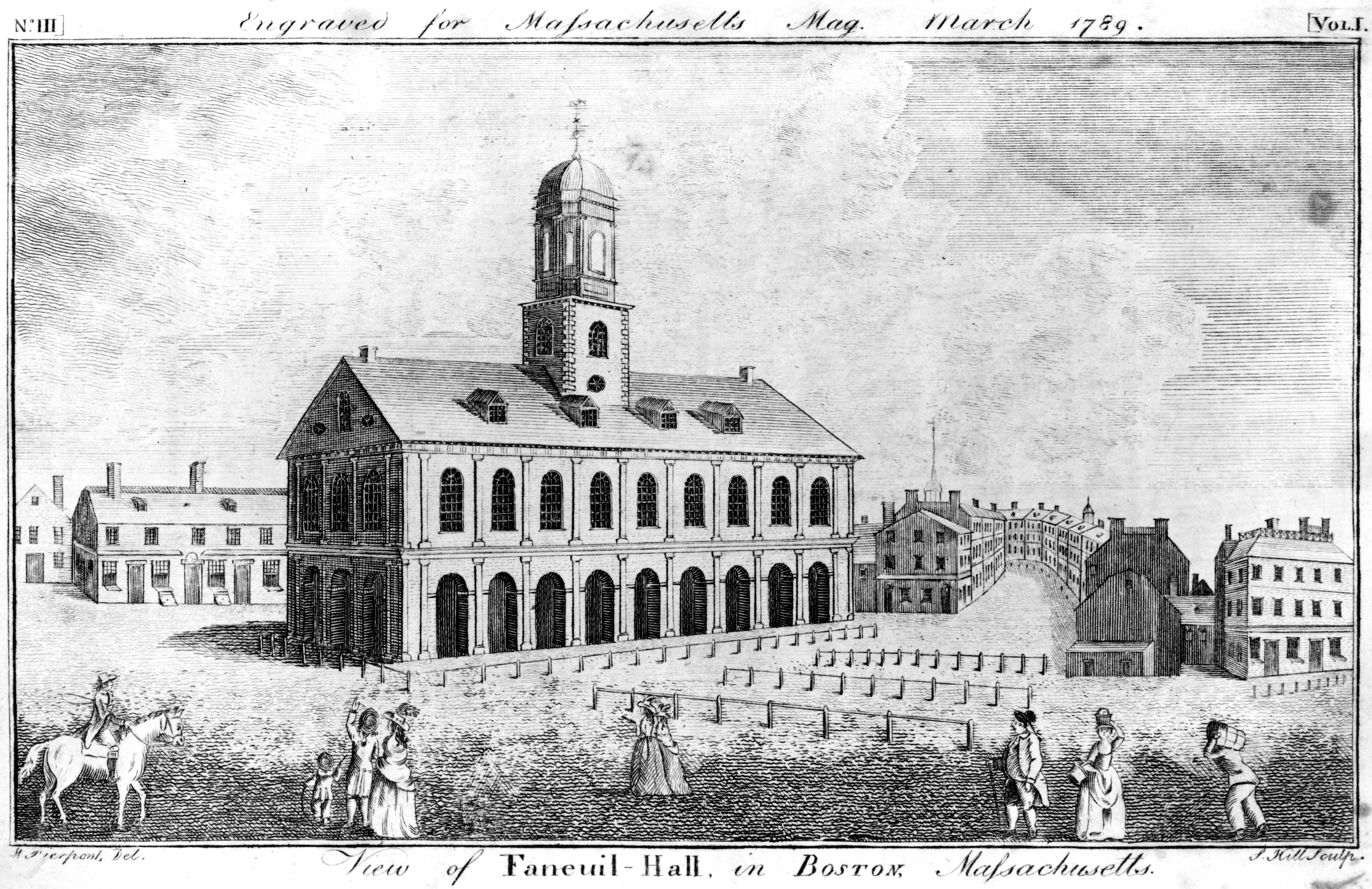
Fanueil Hall, late 18th c.

Delegates from 96 Massachusetts towns and 8 districts began converging in Boston on September 22, 1768. The convention lasted a week. Slightly more than half the delegates were the same men who had represented their towns in the Massachusetts House earlier that year. For some reason, James Otis missed the first three days; his absence likely had a demoralizing effect on the other militants.

The overall tone of the convention was considerably more conservative than that of the Boston town meeting. Thomas Cushing declared that the purpose of the convention, in his view, was to "bring together some prudent people who would be able to check the violent designs of Others." Samuel Adams tried to influence the crowd in a more radical direction, but the moderates held firm. Many had been warned by their constituents to be cautious and not to take part in anything subversive. There were exceptions: Middleborough came out explicitly against the landing of troops, and Braintree and Lexington denounced standing armies as unconstitutional. Most of the delegates from the country, however, were more cautious than the Bostonians. The convention's very first act was to reassure the governor that they did not pretend to have any official authority.

When the delegates politely petitioned the governor to summon the general court, Bernard ordered the convention to disband at once, claiming it was illegal. His response had a chilling effect on some of the more timid members, but the convention continued. The delegates petitioned the king for the redress of grievances in the most respectful terms, professing their loyalty and their "love of peace and good order." Nevertheless, historian Richard D. Brown argues that the very existence of the convention demonstrates that a revolutionary attitude was spreading through Massachusetts: the majority of politically active towns showed that they were ready to defy the governor by attending an extralegal assembly. John C. Miller calls the convention the precursor to the Massachusetts Provincial Congress.

=== Consequences ===
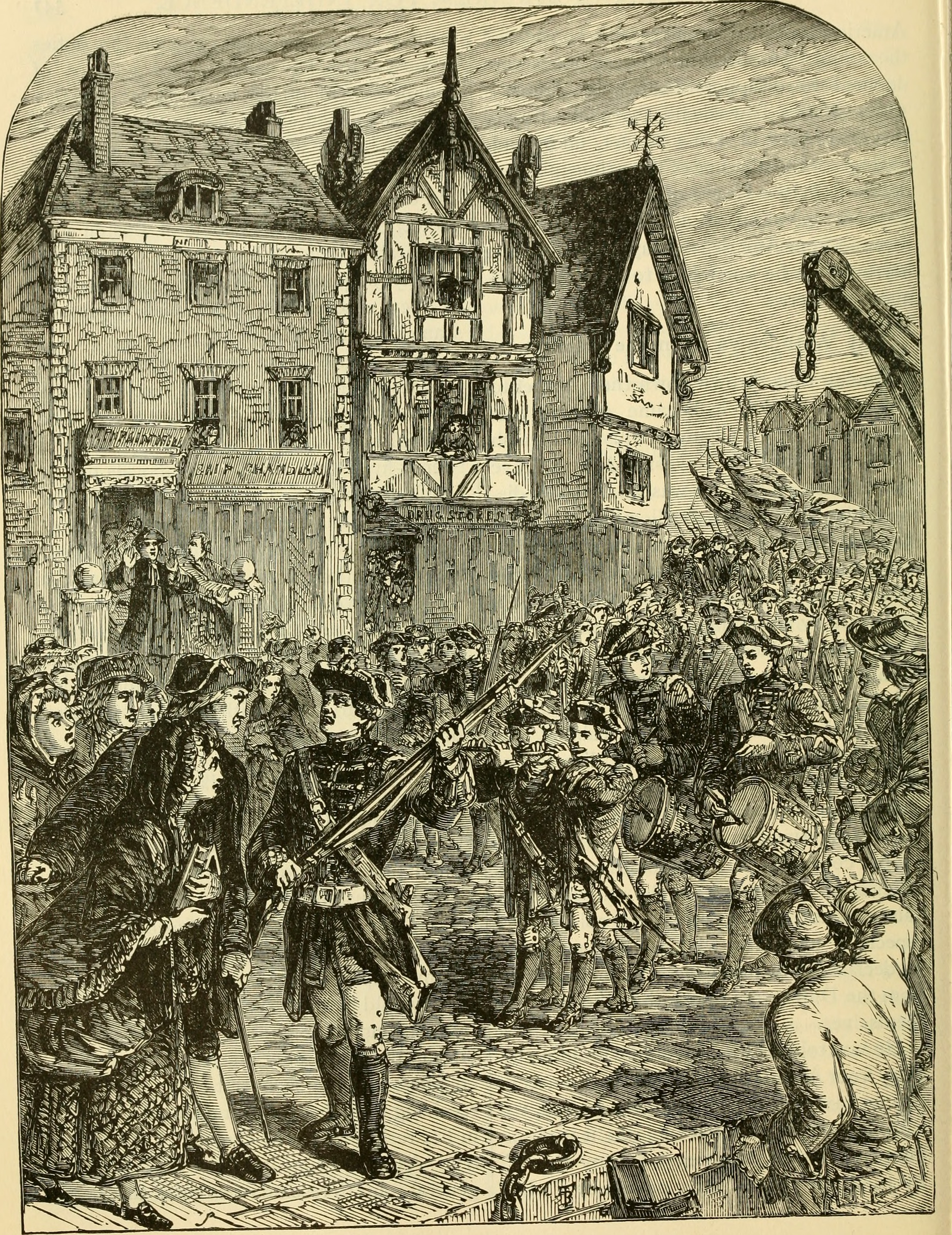
British troops entering Boston, 1768. Illustration from a 1904 history book.

Before the convention ended, a rumor spread through London that Massachusetts was openly rebelling and had called up the militia to fight the British. The news was so disturbing that stock prices dropped on the London exchange.

When the troops sailed into Boston Harbor that October, they approached cautiously, ready for a fight. With their guns trained on the town, the ships lined up as if preparing for a formal siege. According to Thomas Cushing, the troops landed "in Battle Array, expecting from the representations that had been made to them, to meet with a violent opposition."

By this time the militant Bostonians had submitted to the will of the moderate majority. They knew they could not defeat the British alone. Unopposed, the soldiers marched through Boston and took control of Faneuil Hall. Although the patriots tried to obstruct them by denying them housing, even that effort failed, and the soldiers were quartered in town.

After all their incendiary talk, the Boston patriots were ridiculed throughout the colonies for failing to oppose the landing of the troops. New Yorkers joked about their "ridiculous Puff and Bombast." General Gage wrote in a letter, "They are a People, who have ever been very bold in Council, but never remarkable for their Feats in Action." English politicians concluded that the patriots were fond of making empty threats, and should not be taken seriously.

The presence of the soldiers increased tensions in Boston, as recorded in the anonymously penned Journal of Occurrences, which chronicled the occupation. The journal was influential in uniting the colonies, and Boston received much-needed support from other colonies when the Boston Port Bill was passed in 1774.

== Participating towns ==
The following towns sent delegates to the convention. A slash (/) indicates that a single delegate represented two or more towns. All of the delegates were men, as was customary at the time, and almost certainly all were white, but not necessarily landowners; Governor Bernard wrote later that there were "very few Gentlemen there."

The convention proceedings indicate that 96 towns were represented; if that number is accurate, this list is incomplete. Please note that the names and boundaries of some towns and counties have changed since 1768. Some are now part of Maine.

County	Towns
Barnstable	Falmouth, Wellfleet
Berkshire	None
Bristol	Berkley, Dartmouth, Dighton, Norton, Raynham, Rehoboth, Swansey
Cumberland	Brunswick, Falmouth/Cape Elizabeth, Gorham, North Yarmouth, Scarborough
Dukes	None
Essex	Andover, Beverly, Boxford, Bradford, Danvers, Gloucester, Ipswich, Lynn, Newbury, Newburyport, Rowley, Salisbury, Topsfield, Wenham
Hampshire	Brimfield, Colrain, Montague
Lincoln	None
Middlesex	Acton, Ashby, Billerica, Charlestown, Chelmsford, Concord, Holliston, Hopkinton, Lexington, Littleton, Malden, Marlborough, Medford, Newton, Reading, Sherborne, Stow, Townshend, Watertown, Westford, Wilmington
Nantucket	None
Plymouth	Abington, Duxbury, Halifax, Hanover, Kingston, Middleborough, Pembroke, Plymouth, Rochester, Wareham
Suffolk	Boston, Braintree, Brookline, Chelsea, Dedham, (Note: Dedham was represented by Richard Woodward and Nathaniel Sumner.) Dorchester, Hingham, Milton, Roxbury, Stoughton, Walpole, Weymouth, Wrentham
Worcester	Bolton, Grafton, Harvard, Lancaster, Leicester/Spencer/Paxton, Leominster, Lunenburg/Fitchburg, New Braintree, Northborough, Shrewsbury, Sutton, Westboro, Westminster
York	Berwick, Pepperellboro

== See also ==
- Timeline of Boston
- Manufactory House
