= Donato A. Montanaro =

American stockbroker

Donato A. Montanaro Jr.
- Education: Catholic University of America and University of Notre Dame
- Occupations: Stockbroker and entrepreneur

Donato Anthony Montanaro Jr. is an American entrepreneur, stockbroker and private investor who was the founder of two separate stockbrokerages.

== Early life and education ==
Montanaro received a Bachelor of Arts from University of Notre Dame, where he served as Vice President of the Student Body. He received a Juris Doctor from Columbus School of Law at Catholic University of America.

== Career ==
From 1992 to 1997, Montanaro was a stockbroker at Quick & Reilly.

In 1997, Montanaro founded Suretrade and ran the company until it was acquired by FleetBoston Financial's Quick & Reilly in 2001.

In 2005, he founded discount broker Tradeking and acted as its CEO until the company was acquired by Ally Financial in 2016.
