= Farmers' Weekly Review =

Newspaper published in the United States

Farmers Weekly Review
- Type: Weekly newspaper
- Owner: Michael Cleary
- Publisher: Michael Cleary
- Editor: Nick Reiher
- Founded: 1921; 105 years ago
- Language: English
- City: Joliet, Illinois
- Country: United States
- Website: fwrnews.com

Farmers Weekly Review is a newspaper founded in 1921 and published out of Joliet, Illinois, in Will County.

It is a countywide newspaper providing local news and columns, farming news in the county, information about local activities and advertisements.
