= Suretrade =

SURETRADE
- Company type: Private company
- Industry: Financial services
- Founded: 1997
- Founder: Donato A. Montanaro
- Defunct: 2001
- Fate: Acquired by Bank of America
- Headquarters: Lincoln, Rhode Island, United States
- Products: Online stockbroker
- Number of employees: 1,000 (2001)

Suretrade was an American stockbroker firm with an electronic trading platform headquartered in Lincoln, Rhode Island. It was created in 1997 and was acquired by FleetBoston Financial's Quick & Reilly in 2001.

Prior to its acquisition the company had over 350,000 customers and nearly $2 billion in assets.

== History ==
The company was founded in 1997 as a division of Quick & Reilly by Donato A. Montanaro. Quick & Reilly was acquired by FleetBoston Financial in 1998.

In early 1999, FleetBoston considered an initial public offering for the unit but plans were scrapped in October 1999 after the dot-com bubble started to crash.

In an October 1999 Fortune (magazine) article, Montanaro claimed that Suretrade was rated the #1 broker for aggressive traders and #2 for beginning investors. In 2000, the company launched advertising that promoted market timing.

Suretrade was folded into Quick & Reilly in 2001 as investors wanted more advisory services after the crash of the dot-com bubble.
