= FleetBoston Financial =

Bank in Boston, Massachusetts (1999–2004)

- Type: Public
- Industry: Financial services
- Predecessor: BankBoston; Fleet Financial Group
- Founded: 1999; 27 years ago
- Defunct: 2004
- Fate: Acquisition by Bank of America
- Successor: Bank of America
- Headquarters: Boston, Massachusetts, United States
- Revenue: US$12 billion
- Number of employees: Approximately 50,000

FleetBoston Financial was a Boston, Massachusetts–based bank created in 1999 by the merger of Fleet Financial Group and BankBoston. In 2004 it merged with Bank of America; all of its banks and branches were converted to Bank of America.

== History ==
Fleet's oldest predecessor was The Massachusetts Bank founded in 1784. The Massachusetts Bank was the first federally chartered joint-stock owned bank in the United States and only the second bank to receive a charter in the United States. The bank's charter was signed by John Hancock and among its early account holders were such notable figures as Paul Revere, Samuel Adams, John Hancock and Henry Knox. The bank's founders were largely made up of merchants who wanted to use a U.S., rather than British bank to send money abroad. It was first headquartered at the old Manufactory House, near Boston Common. The bank was the only bank in the city of Boston until the Union Bank (later the Bank of New England) was founded in 1792. This bank became BankBoston which merged into Fleet in 1999.

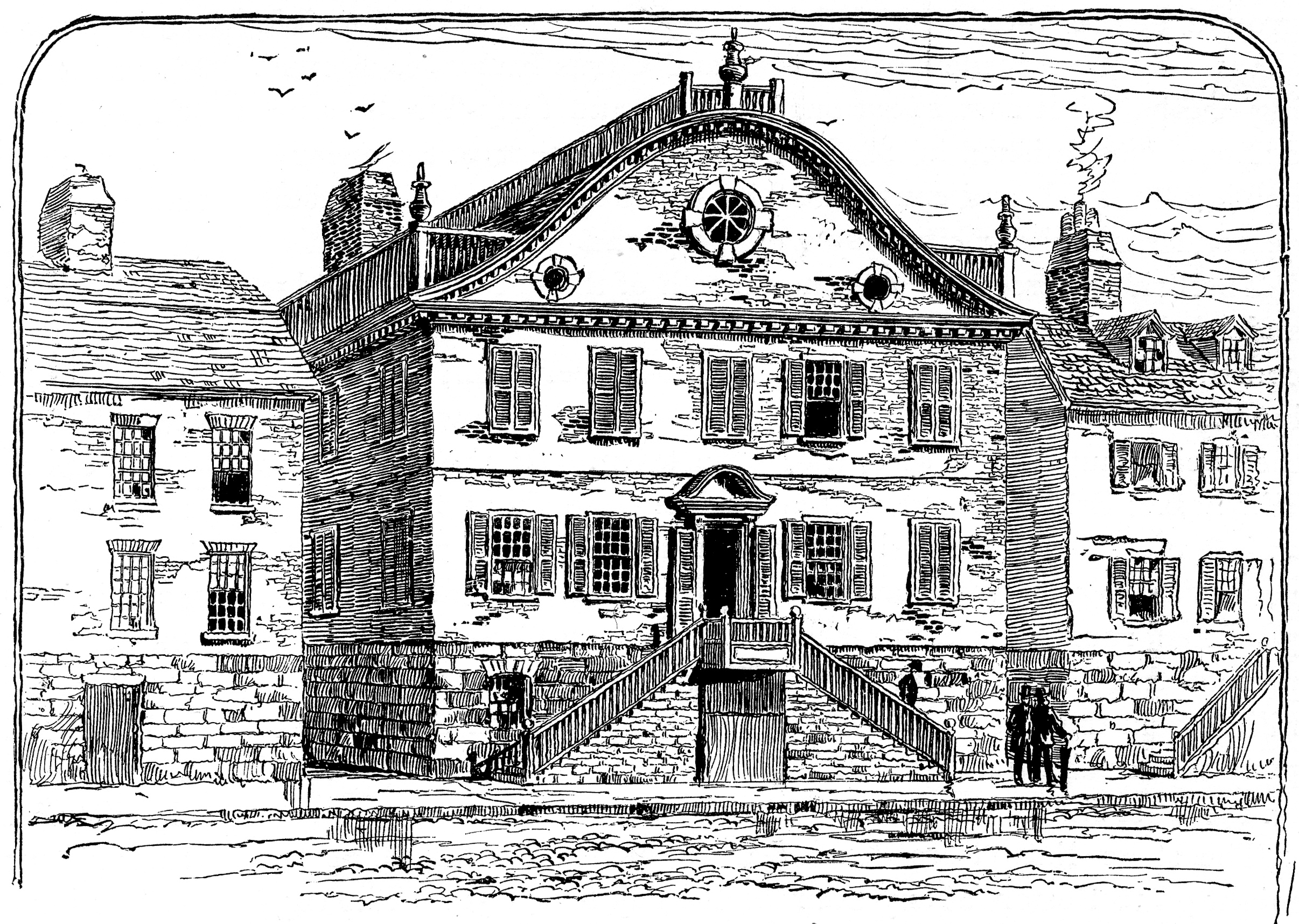
Providence Bank around the time of its founding in 1791. The building still stands on South Main Street.

Fleet's direct predecessor began in Providence, Rhode Island in 1791 as the Providence Bank, founded by Rhode Island businessman John Brown. It joined the national banking system in 1865 as Providence National Bank. In 1951, it bought Union Trust Company to form Providence Union Bank and Trust Company. Three years later, it bought Industrial Trust Company (founded in 1886 by Samuel P. Colt) to form Industrial National Bank. In 1968, it became the leading subsidiary of Industrial National Corporation.

Industrial began diversifying into non-bank financial services in the mid-1970s. To reflect this, it changed its name to Fleet Financial Group in 1982, with the banking subsidiary becoming Fleet National Bank. It then began an aggressive buying spree of banks outside Rhode Island, most notably the Bank of New England in 1991. In 1988, Fleet merged with Albany, New York–based Norstar Bancorp to form Fleet/Norstar Financial Group. The bank continued to operate as Norstar in New York until 1992, when the company readopted the Fleet Financial Group name.

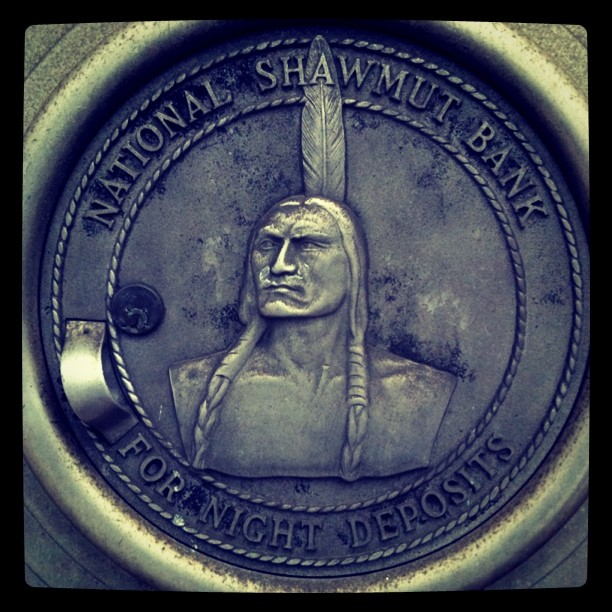
A night deposit box for National Shawmut Bank displaying the company symbol Chief Obbatinewat, located at a current Bank of America location in Boston.

Fleet was already one of the three largest banks in New England, together with Shawmut National Corporation and its largest affiliate Shawmut Bank, and Bank of Boston. Despite this, state and federal regulators allowed Fleet to merge with Shawmut in 1995. The merger created the largest bank in New England, with over 30 percent of the region's deposits. It was also the ninth largest in the United States. Although Fleet was the surviving company, the merged bank was based at Shawmut's old headquarters at One Federal Street in Boston.

In 1996, Fleet acquired the US branch network (in New York and New Jersey) of the British National Westminster Bank.

In 1998, Fleet acquired Quick & Reilly discount brokerage and their deep-discount, online subsidiary Suretrade.

Fleet's biggest merger came in 1999, when it acquired BankBoston (which was itself the fruit of a 1996 merger between Bank of Boston and BayBank). The new FleetBoston was the culmination of a series of Boston-area bank mergers that combined several smaller banks into a single large institution. FleetBoston was the seventh-largest bank in the United States, as measured by assets (US$197 billion in 2003). It had almost 50,000 employees, over 20 million customers worldwide and revenues of $12 billion per year. The banking subsidiary operated under the Fleet name, but used BankBoston's stylized eagle logo. Corporate headquarters moved to BankBoston's former headquarters at 100 Federal Street. As a condition for merger, regulators required Fleet to divest 306 New England branches, including 28 to community banks.

In 2000, Fleet acquired New Jersey–based Summit Bancorp which had previously operated as UJB Financial before acquiring Summit in 1996. The same year, Fleet sold 278 of its New England branches to Sovereign Bank as a part of the divestiture plan required by regulators to allow the 1999 acquisition of BankBoston. After Bank of America acquired Fleet in 2004, its overall Customer Satisfaction Index (as measured by the University of Michigan), was lowered from 74 to 72. Bank of America devoted considerable resources to improving its New England branches' reputation for customer service, establishing customer call centers and hiring more tellers per branch. Fleet's former headquarters now serves as the base for Bank of America's New England operations.

== Sponsorships ==
When the arena was built to replace the aging Boston Garden, Fleet acquired the naming rights to the newly built Shawmut Center. The arena therefore opened as the FleetCenter in 1995. After FleetBoston's sale to Bank of America in 2004, the bank chose to give up its naming rights and an announcement was made on March 3, 2005 that the arena would be renamed TD Banknorth Garden (now simply the TD Garden). It is home to the Boston Celtics of the National Basketball Association and the Boston Bruins of the National Hockey League.

== Controversies ==
In 2002, FleetBoston Financial, along with Aetna and CSX Transportation, was sued by Deadria Farmer-Paellmann, head of the nonprofit Restitution Study Group of Hoboken, New Jersey. The suit asked for "unspecified damages, restitution for unpaid slave labor and a share of corporate profits derived from slavery" from the three companies. The lawsuit claimed FleetBoston Financial, Aetna, and CSX were "unjustly enriched" by "a system that enslaved, tortured, starved and exploited human beings". Prior to the abolition of slavery, predecessor banks which formed FleetBoston Financial were involved in the American slave trade. The suit was dismissed in 2004.

FleetBoston faced a class-action suit over a "bait and switch" scam where it promised a no-annual fee credit card, only to impose a fee months later.

== See also ==
- List of bank mergers in the United States
- National Westminster Bank USA
