= Bank of New England =

Former regional banking institution based in Boston, Massachusetts

Bank of New England Corporation (When it was a regional bank).
- Non-color logo from 1988
- Type: Subsidiary
- Industry: Banking
- Predecessor: Bank of New England Corporation and CBT Corporation
- Founded: 1985; 41 years ago
- Defunct: 1991
- Fate: Bankruptcy liquidation
- Successor: Recoll Management Corporation
- Headquarters: Boston, Massachusetts, United States
- Number of locations: 470+ branches at peak
- Area served: Northeastern United States
- Key people: Lawrence Fish, Walter Connolly
- Net income: -$450,000,000 (1990Q4)
- Total assets: $21,900,000,000 (1990)
- Parent: Bank of New England Corporation
- Subsidiaries: Connecticut Bank & Trust Company; Maine National Bank; Bank of New England Trust Company

The Bank of New England Corporation refers to a current online real estate bank based in New Hampshire and former regional banking institution based in Boston, Massachusetts, which was seized by the Federal Deposit Insurance Corporation (FDIC) in 1991 as a result of heavy losses in its loan portfolio and was placed into Chapter 7 liquidation. At the time, it was the 33rd largest bank in the United States, and its federal seizure bailout was the second-largest on record. At its peak, it had been the 18th largest bank and had over 470 branch offices. The liquidation company was named Recoll Management Corporation and its bankruptcy estate has continued to exist to pay out claims against the company. As of 2016, most of what was once Bank of New England is now part of Bank of America.

Since 2007, a privately held bank in New Hampshire has been known as Bank of New England, but it shares no history with the defunct Boston-based institution.

== Formation and interstate growth ==
The Bank of New England Corporation was formed as the first interstate regional bank in the United States in 1985 as a result of a merger between the (old) Bank of New England Corporation and CBT Corporation. CBT was the parent of Connecticut Bank and Trust Company, which traced its roots to the Union Bank of New London (founded in 1792), as well as the Connecticut Trust and Safe Deposit Company, the Hartford Trust Company, and the Phoenix State Bank and Trust Company (founded in 1814). The old Bank of New England traced its roots to the Merchants Bank (founded in 1831) and was for a time known as the New England Merchants National Bank and the New England National Bank of Boston.

The Bank Holding Company Act of 1956 prohibited interstate bank holding companies (although some existing companies were "grandfathered"). The 1966 Douglas Amendment to the Act permitted interstate bank holding companies as long as the individual states also permitted it. Connecticut and Massachusetts were among the first states to implement reciprocal legislation and in 1984 New England Merchants National Bank and CBT Corporation attempted to test this legislation by applying for permission to merge. Citicorp challenged the merger under the constitutional concept known as an "illegal compact between states". Despite a new federal law creating a New England regional interstate banking zone, the case continued and was appealed to the Supreme Court in Northeast Bancorp, Inc. v. Governors, FRS, 472 U.S. 159 (1985), which found the interstate compact was not illegal. This paved the way for the merger of the entities in 1985 and several subsequent mergers of other banks.

In 1987 the new Bank of New England Corporation acquired the Conifer Group of community banks and in 1988 was listed on the New York Stock Exchange under the symbol NEB. However, the bank swung from a 74 million dollar profit in 1989 to a 1.2 billion dollar loss in 1990. This loss is attributed to poor investments in the real estate market and was part of the larger savings and loan crisis engulfing the banking industry at the time. These investments were the result of CEO Walter Connolly's aggressive growth and acquisition strategies throughout the mid-1980s and in 1989 he was forced to resign by the board of directors and replaced by Lawrence Fish. At the same time as his resignation, the federal government issued a cease and desist order to the bank to restrain its lending practices, which were considered a risk to its solvency.

== Crisis and decline ==
Despite efforts to restore the company's financial health, such as selling the credit card unit to Citigroup and laying off 5,600 employees, the bank continued to experience large losses. The Federal Reserve's Boston branch loaned the bank $478 million as temporary financing, however real estate related losses for the year of nearly 6 billion dollars overwhelmed the bank's solvency. Part of the problem involved large loans made between bank entities in the holding group that distorted financial results, as well as embezzlement by a vice-president of the bank, which was discovered at the height of the crisis in late 1990. In January 1991 the FDIC seized Bank of New England's three subsidiary banks—Bank of New England Trust Company, Connecticut Bank and Trust, and Maine National Bank—and placed them into Chapter 7 bankruptcy liquidation. To avoid an expected bank run due to panic, the FDIC insured all accounts, even those above the $100,000 insurance limit, with the total cost of the bailout estimated at $2.3 billion. The FDIC indicated that a panic at the Bank of New England would have created a systemic risk to the entire financial markets. Even with the additional assurance, over a billion and a half dollars were withdrawn from the bank in the days leading up to the seizure, compounding the effect of withdrawals that had taken place over the prior year of turmoil at the bank. These withdrawals occurred in long Depression-era lines that were widely reported in the press. The Bank of New England Trust Company in West Palm Beach, Florida which was a subsidiary of the Bank of New England was not taken over and was instead sold off as part of the liquidation process.

== Liquidation ==
Subsequently three bridge banks were set up to oversee the assets of the Bank of New England, Connecticut Bank & Trust Company, and Maine National Bank. These bridge banks were transferred to Fleet/Norstar Financial Group and Kohlberg Kravis Roberts and operated by Fleet, and later Bank of America, as the Recoll Management Corporation, collecting loans owed to the defunct banks. Major payments were made in 1998 for $140 million in claims and in the end secured creditors received 100% of their money while unsecured creditors received 34 cents on the dollar. However, as of 2009, creditors were still disputing the allocation of the final 101 million dollars that the bankruptcy trustee had to distribute. Eventually, an online real estate bank based in New Hampshire, with no affiliation with the defunct Boston-based bank, was established. This New Hampshire based bank still exists today.

== Southern New Hampshire Bank & Trust ==
In 2007, the Southern New Hampshire Bank & Trust of Salem, New Hampshire, was renamed as the Bank of New England; however, it shares no connection to the earlier institution.

== See also ==
- List of largest U.S. bank failures
