= Manufactory House =

- Location within Boston Location within Massachusetts Location within the United States
- 42°21.413′N 071°03.690′W
- Type: Linen factory
- Location: Long Acre Street

History
- Built: 1753
- Demolished: 1806

Site notes
- Owner: Province of Massachusetts Bay

The Manufactory House in Boston, Massachusetts, was a linen manufactory built in 1753 to provide employment for local women and girls. The business failed, and the building was rented out to various tenants.

In 1768, it was the site of a standoff between townspeople and occupying British soldiers. Governor Francis Bernard had offered the use of the building to the 14th regiment, but the building's existing tenants refused to leave. The incident, although minor, was arguably the first violent confrontation between Americans and British soldiers.

== Early history ==
In the mid-18th century, the spinning trade became popular and even fashionable among the women and girls of Boston. It had been brought there a few decades earlier by Irish weavers. By making their own cloth, colonists hoped to be able to reduce their dependence on imports from England. In addition, spinning and weaving did not require much education or physical strength, and were seen as ideal occupations for working-class women and children.

Around 1748, a group of Boston philanthropists established the Society for Encouraging Industry and Commerce and the Employing the Poor. (Note: According to Carl Bridenbaugh, the Manufactory House was "established" in 1748. According to Gary B. Nash, the Society was established long before the actual building was constructed in 1753.) Its aim was to build a linen manufactory "to employ the Female Youth from eight years upwards" from large families, so that they could work to support themselves "Instead of being a Burthen to their Parents or the Town." After several years of trying to raise the funds privately, the Society received a loan from the town in March 1753, and three months later the General Court voted to impose a luxury tax on coaches for five years to support the school. Construction on the Manufactory House began in the spring of 1753 and was completed that fall.

The two-story brick building stood on Long Acre Street (now Tremont Street) across from where the Park Street Church now stands. It was 140 feet long, with a large cellar, and was fronted by a flight of "double stone stairs, handsomely railed." The west wall was decorated with a figure of a woman holding a distaff. To celebrate the opening, the Society held a spinning exhibition on Boston Common. Around 300 spinners, mostly young girls, "and several of them Daughters of the best Families," showed off their skills and competed. On a special stage, a weaver worked at his loom.

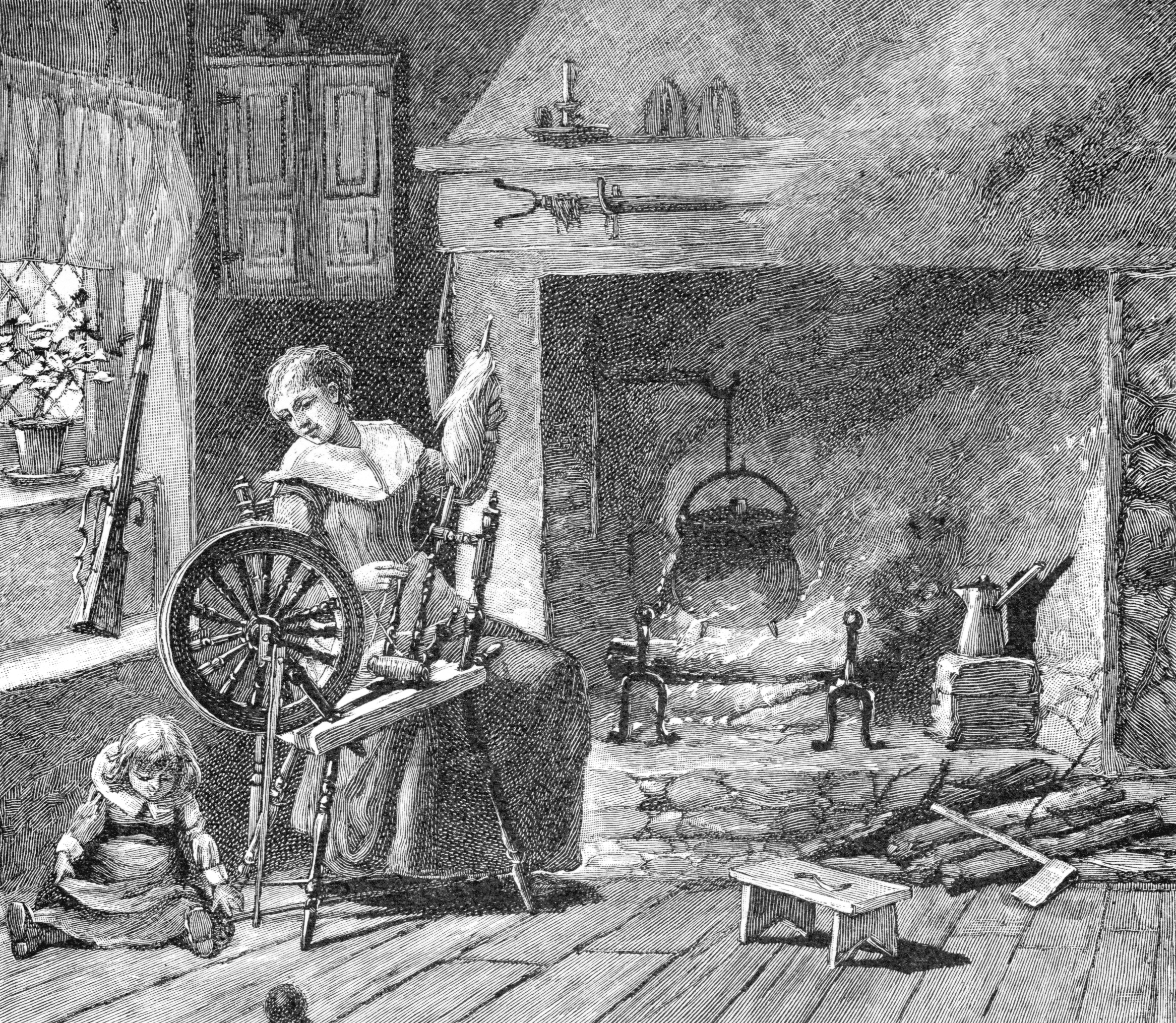
Colonial women preferred to do their spinning at home, where they could multitask.

The Manufactory House could not compete with cheap imports, and never turned a profit. In Scotland and Ireland, women typically did their spinning at home, in their spare time, and sold their yarn directly to the weavers. The workers at the Manufactory House were expected to spend all day away from their families, yet were not paid enough to live on; a spinner made about seven shillings a week. The manufactory closed its doors in 1759. The spinning school reopened briefly in 1764, but the province closed it down in 1766 and began renting the building to various tenants.

== 1768 incident ==
In September 1768, Governor Bernard met with members of the provincial council to see about housing for the British troops who were on their way to Boston to occupy the town. General Gage had ordered two regiments from Halifax, and was planning to send two more from Ireland.

Council members were not appointed by the Crown, but chosen locally, and they were not inclined to assist the British army in any way. Colonists feared that a standing army, garrisoned among civilians, would undermine their constitutional rights. The council argued that the barracks at Castle William (an island fort in Boston Harbor) could easily hold two regiments; and under the Quartering Act, they were not required to make any other arrangements until the existing barracks were filled. Bernard warned them that Gage had specifically requested housing within the town proper, and if the council failed to comply, the officers would simply take over buildings of their own choosing.

The Manufactory House was large enough to house a regiment, and conveniently located just a few yards from Boston Common. At the time, it was under lease to Elisha Brown, a weaver, who lived there with his family and a few other weavers, along with a number of homeless squatters. Bernard suggested converting the building to a barracks, but the council refused to authorize it. Over the next few days, Bernard wrangled with the council but made no headway. Finally he authorized the use of the Manufactory House himself, bypassing the council and, technically, exceeding his legal authority. Lieutenant Colonel William Dalrymple, commander of the 14th regiment, was told to quarter his men there.

On October 1, an officer informed Brown that he and the other residents had two hours to leave the premises. Brown protested and was brought before Dalrymple, who agreed "for the sake of the People" to seek other accommodations. By the 19th, however, the housing situation had not been resolved. Troops were camped out on Boston Common, in Faneuil Hall, and in the Town House. Sheriff William Greenleaf and Lieutenant Governor Thomas Hutchinson went to the house and told the residents to clear out, warning them of "disagreeable" consequences if they refused. From an open window, Brown declared that nothing would induce him to leave but force or an order of the General Court; and the governor had recently dissolved the General Court.

When Greenleaf returned the next day, he happened to notice one of the weavers climbing out through an unlocked cellar window. He rushed over and, after scuffling with the weaver, forced his way into the cellar. The door that led upstairs was barred against him. Rather than batter down the doors, Greenleaf decided to starve the residents out. He posted guards with bayonets around the house and in the cellar so that no food or water could be brought in. An apprentice of Dr. Church attempted to deliver medicine to a sick resident and was roughly turned away. On the 21st, according to one account, there were "children at the windows crying for bread." A large crowd of sympathetic townspeople gathered in the street. Someone managed to throw some provisions into an open window and was assaulted by the guards, resulting in "the loss of blood, but no lives." As the crowd grew, the situation threatened to escalate into a full-blown riot. To prevent further violence, the governor decided to end the siege; by the morning of the 22nd, the troops had been withdrawn.

== Later history ==
The first anniversary of the Boston Massacre was observed at the Manufactory House, "that being the place where the first opposition to the soldiery was made." The spinning school was reopened in 1769 under William Molineaux, with funds borrowed from the town. Within a year, the school had taught 300 women and children how to spin, and the practice was extremely popular among the girls of Boston.

The building served as a British army hospital following the Battle of Bunker Hill in 1775. It became the first headquarters of the Massachusetts Bank, Boston's first financial institution, in 1784. It was demolished in 1806. A plaque marking the site was placed at the eastern corner of Winter and Tremont Streets by the Bostonian Society.

== See also ==
- Massachusetts Circular Letter
- Massachusetts Convention of Towns
- Journal of Occurrences

== Bibliography ==
- Archer, Richard (2010). As If an Enemy's Country: The British Occupation of Boston and the Origins of Revolution. Oxford University Press. ISBN 9780199700134.
- Barbier, Brooke (2017). Boston in the American Revolution: A Town versus an Empire. Arcadia Publishing. ISBN 9781439658789.
- Bowdoin, James; Warren, Joseph; Pemberton, Samuel (1770). A Short Narrative of the Horrid Massacre in Boston, Perpetrated in the Evening of the Fifth Day of March, 1770, by the Soldiers of the 29th Regiment. Town of Boston. ISBN 9781557099518.
- Bridenbaugh, Carl (1971). Cities in Revolt: Urban Life in America, 1743–1776. London: Oxford University Press. ISBN 978-0-19-501362-7.
- Chase, Ellen (1910). The Beginnings of the American Revolution: Based on Contemporary Letters, Diaries, and Other Documents, Volume 1. New York: The Baker and Taylor Company.
- Cullen, James B. (1890). The Story of the Irish in Boston. James B. Cullen & Company.
- Farnam, Henry Walcott (1938). Chapters in the History of Social Legislation in the United States to 1860. The Lawbook Exchange, Ltd. ISBN 9781584770541.
- Hower, Ralph M., ed. (1937). "A History of Boston's Oldest Bank". Bulletin of the Business Historical Society. 11 (6). The President and Fellows of Harvard College: 101–104. doi:10.2307/3110492. JSTOR 3110492.
- Nash, Gary B. (1985). "The Failure of Female Factory Labor in Colonial Boston". In Leab, Daniel J. (ed.). The Labor History Reader. University of Illinois Press. pp. 42–95. ISBN 9780252011986.
- Winsor, Justin (1882). The Memorial History of Boston: Including Suffolk County, Massachusetts. 1630-1880, Volume 2. Boston: James R. Osgood and Company.
