= Townshend Acts =

Political precursor to the American Revolution

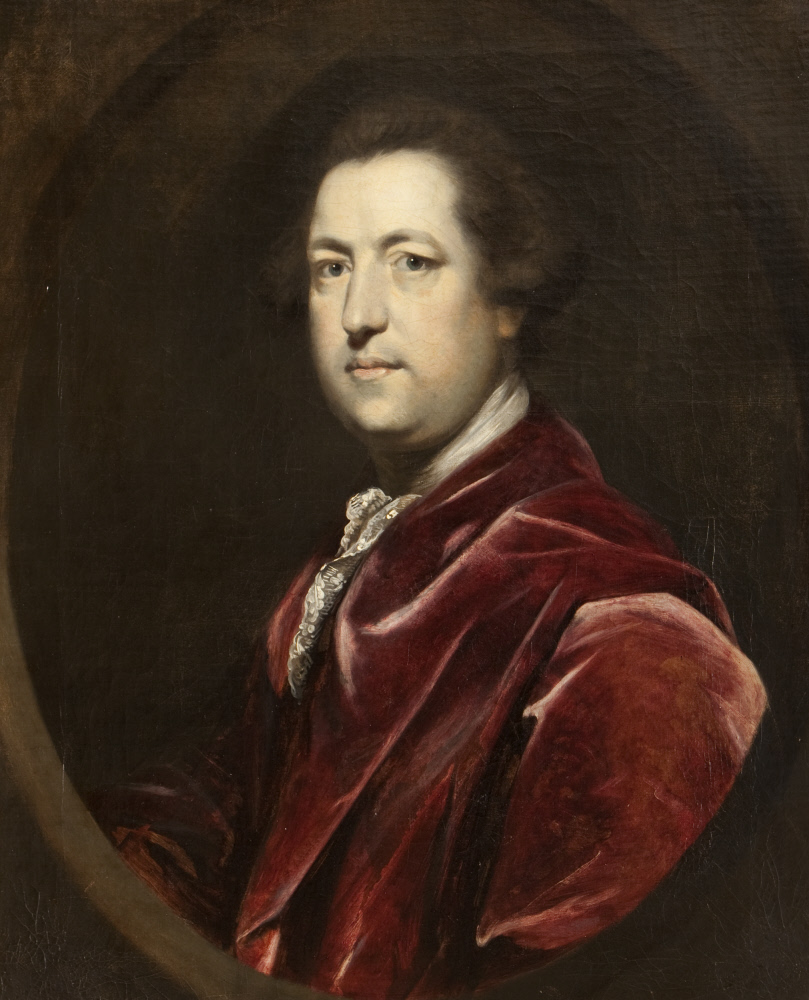
Charles Townshend spearheaded the laws, but died before their detrimental effects became apparent.

The Townshend Acts (/ˈtaʊnzənd/) or Townshend Duties were a series of British acts of Parliament enacted in 1767 and 1768 introducing a series of taxes and regulations to enable administration of the British colonies in America. They are named after Charles Townshend, the Chancellor of the Exchequer who proposed the program. Historians vary slightly as to which acts should be included under the heading "Townshend Acts", but five are often listed: (Note: Dickerson for example, writes that there were four Townshend Acts, and does not mention the New York Restraining Act, which Chaffin says was "officially a part of the Townshend Acts".)

- The Revenue Act 1767 passed on 29 June 1767.
- The Commissioners of Customs Act 1767 passed on 29 June 1767.
- The Indemnity Act 1767 passed on 2 July 1767.
- The New York Restraining Act 1767 passed on 2 July 1767.
- The Vice Admiralty Court Act 1768 passed on 8 March 1768.

The purposes of the acts were to

- raise revenue in the colonies to pay the salaries of governors and judges so that they would remain loyal to Great Britain,
- Create more effective means of enforcing compliance with trade regulations,
- punish the Province of New York for failing to comply with the 1765 Quartering Act, and
- establish the precedent that the British Parliament had the right to tax the colonies.

The Townshend Acts met with resistance in the colonies and was the subject of widespread debate, including in colonial newspapers. Opponents of the Acts gradually became violent, leading to the Boston Massacre in 1770. The Acts placed an indirect tax on glass, lead, paints, paper, and tea, all of which had to be imported from Britain. This form of revenue generation was Townshend's response to the failure of the Stamp Act 1765, which had provided the first form of direct taxation placed upon the colonies. However, the import duties proved to be similarly controversial. Colonial opposition to the acts was expressed in John Dickinson's Letters from a Farmer in Pennsylvania and in the Massachusetts Circular Letter. There was widespread protest, and American port cities refused to import British goods, so Parliament began to partially repeal the Townshend duties.

In March 1770, most of the taxes from the Townshend Acts were repealed by Parliament under Frederick, Lord North. However, the import duty on tea was retained in order to demonstrate to the colonists that Parliament held the sovereign authority to tax its colonies, in accordance with the Declaratory Act 1766. Colonial resentment, spurred by the creation of a corrupt board of commissioners, led to attacks on British ships, including the burning of Gaspee in 1772. The Townshend Acts' taxation of imported tea was enforced once again by the Tea Act 1773, and this led to the Boston Tea Party in 1773 in which the Sons of Liberty destroyed a large shipment of taxed tea. Parliament responded in 1774 with the punitive Intolerable Acts. The Thirteen Colonies drilled their militia units, and war finally erupted in Lexington and Concord in April 1775, launching the American Revolution.

== Background ==
Following the Seven Years' War (1756–1763), the British government was deep in debt. To pay a small fraction of the costs of the newly expanded empire, the Parliament of Great Britain decided to levy new taxes on the colonies of British America. Previously, through the Trade and Navigation Acts, Parliament had used taxation to regulate the trade of the empire. But with the Sugar Act 1764, Parliament sought, for the first time, to tax the colonies for the specific purpose of raising revenue. American colonists argued that there were constitutional issues involved.

The Americans claimed they were not represented in Parliament, but the British government retorted that they had "virtual representation", a concept the Americans rejected. This issue, only briefly debated following the Sugar Act, became a major point of contention after Parliament's passage of the Stamp Act 1765. The Stamp Act proved to be wildly unpopular in the colonies, contributing to its repeal the following year, along with the failure to raise substantial revenue.

Implicit in the Stamp Act dispute was an issue more fundamental than taxation and representation: the question of the extent of Parliament's authority in the colonies. Parliament provided its answer to this question when it repealed the Stamp Act in 1766 by simultaneously passing the Declaratory Act, which proclaimed that Parliament could legislate for the colonies "in all cases whatsoever".

== The Five Townshend Acts ==
=== The Revenue Act 1767 ===
Duties on Tea, etc. (American Plantations) Act 1766
- Act of Parliament
- Parliament of Great Britain
- Long title: An act for granting certain duties in the British colonies and plantations in America; for allowing a drawback of the duties of customs upon the exportation, from this kingdom, of coffee and cocoa nuts of the produce of the said colonies or plantations; for discontinuing the drawbacks payable on china earthen ware exported to America; and for more effectually preventing the clandestine running of goods in the colonies and plantations.
- Citation: 7 Geo. 3. c. 46
- Introduced by: 10 June 1767, John Paterson (Commons)
- Territorial extent: Great Britain; British America

Dates
- Royal assent: 29 June 1767
- Commencement: 20 November 1767 (Note: Section 1.)
- Repealed: 15 July 1867
Other legislation
Amended by	Customs Act 1770; Taxation of Colonies Act 1778; Customs Law Repeal Act 1825; Customs Act 1826
Repealed by	Statute Law Revision Act 1867

Status: Repealed

Text of statute as originally enacted

This act was the (joint) first act, passed on 29 June 1767, the same day as the Commissioners of Customs Act (see below).

It placed taxes on glass, lead, "painters' colors" (paint), paper, and tea. It also gave the supreme court of each colony the power to issue "writs of assistance", general warrants that could be issued to customs officers and used to search private property for smuggled goods.

And whereas by an act of parliament, (Note: Customs Act 1662 (14 Cha. 2. c. 11)) [...] it is lawful for any officer of his Majesty's customs, authorized by writ of assistance under the seal of his Majesty's court of exchequer, [...] and in the day-time to enter and go into any house, shop, cellar, warehouse, or room or other place, and in case of resistance, to break open doors, chests, trunks, and other package there, to seize, and from thence to bring, any kind of goods or merchandize whatsoever prohibited or uncustomed, and to put and secure the same in his Majesty's store-house next to the place where such seizure shall be made; and whereas by an act (Note: Navigation Act 1696 (7 & 8 Will. 3. c. 22)) [...] it is, amongst other things, enacted, that the officers for collecting and managing his Majesty's revenue, and inspecting the plantation trade, in America, shall have the same powers and authorities [as] is provided for the officers of England: but, no authority being expressly given by the said act [...] to any particular court to grant such writs of assistance for the officers of the customs in the said plantations, it is doubted whether such officers can legally enter houses and other places on land, to search for and seize goods, in the manner directed by the said recited acts.

To obviate which doubts for the future, and in order to carry the intention of the said recited acts into effectual execution, be it enacted [...], That from and after the said twentieth day of November, one thousand seven hundred and sixty seven, such writs of assistance, [...] shall and may be granted by the said superior or supreme court of justice having jurisdiction within such colony or plantation respectively.

— 7 Geo. 3. c. 46, s. 10

There was an angry response from colonists, who deemed the taxes a threat to their rights as British subjects. The use of writs of assistance was significantly controversial since the right to be secure in one's private property was an established right in Britain.

=== The Commissioners of Customs Act 1767 ===
Commissioners of Customs Act 1767
- Act of Parliament
- Parliament of Great Britain
- Long title: An act to enable his Majesty to put the customs, and other duties, in the British dominions in America, and the execution of the laws relating to trade there, under the management of commissioners to be appointed for that purpose, and to be resident in the said dominions.
- Citation: 7 Geo. 3. c. 41
- Introduced by: 3 June 1767 Grey Cooper, Secretary to the Treasury (Commons)
- Territorial extent: Great Britain; British America

Dates
- Royal assent: 29 June 1767
- Commencement: 11 November 1766 (Note: Start of session.)
- Repealed: 5 July 1825
Other legislation
Repealed by	Customs Law Repeal Act 1825
Relates to	Trade Act 1672

Status: Repealed

Text of statute as originally enacted

This act was passed on 29 June 1767. It created a new Customs Board for the North American colonies, to be headquartered in Boston with five customs commissioners. New offices were eventually opened in other ports as well. The board was created to enforce shipping regulations and increase tax revenue. Previously, customs enforcement was handled by the Customs Board back in England. Due to the distance, enforcement was poor, taxes were avoided and smuggling was rampant.

Be it therefore enacted [...] that the customs and other duties imposed [...] upon any goods or merchandise brought or imported into, or exported or carried from, any British colony or plantation in America, may, from time to time, be put under the management and direction of such commissioners, to reside in the said plantations, as his Majesty [...] shall judge to be most for the advantage or trade, and security of the revenue of the said British colonies.

— 7 Geo. 3. c. 41 s. 1

Once the new Customs Board was in operation, enforcement increased, leading to a confrontation with smuggling colonists. Incidents between customs officials, military personnel and colonists broke out across the colonies, eventually leading to the occupation of Boston by British troops and the Boston Massacre in 1770.

=== The New York Restraining Act 1767 ===
Rebellion in America Act 1767
- Act of Parliament
- Parliament of Great Britain
- Long title: An act for restraining and prohibiting the governor, council, and house of representatives, of the province of New York, until provision shall have been made for furnishing the King's troops with all the necessaries required by law, from passing or assenting to any act of assembly, vote, or resolution, for any other purpose.
- Citation: 7 Geo. 3. c. 59
- Introduced by: 27 May 1767 Edward Willes, Solicitor General (Commons)
- Territorial extent: Great Britain; British America

Dates
- Royal assent: 2 July 1767
- Commencement: 1 October 1767 (Note: Section 1.)
- Repealed: 15 July 1867
Other legislation
Repealed by	Statute Law Revision Act 1867
Relates to	Mutiny, America Act 1765; Mutiny in America Act 1766; Tea Act 1767

Status: Repealed

Text of statute as originally enacted

This was the (joint) third of the five acts, passed on 2 July 1767, the same day as the Indemnity Act.

It forbade the New York Assembly and the governor of New York from passing any new bills until they complied with the Quartering Act 1765. That act required New York authorities to provide housing, foodstuffs and supplies for the British troops stationed there to defend the colony. The New York Assembly resisted the Quartering Act on the grounds it did not limit the number of troops to be quartered and that Parliament could not constitutionally tax the colony without its consent. Resentment in the Assembly towards the quartering of soldiers also grew as a result of the end of the French and Indian War, as the French threat to the colony subsided.

That from and after the first day of October, one thousand seven hundred and sixty seven, until provision shall have been made by the said assembly of New York for furnishing his Majesty's troops within the said province with all such necessaries as are required by the said acts of parliament ... it shall not be lawful for the governor ... to pass, or give his or their assent to, or concurrence in, the making or passing of any act of assembly; or his or their assent to any order, resolution, or vote, in concurrence with the house of representatives for the time being within the said colony, or for the said house of representatives to pass or make any bill, order, resolution, or vote, (orders, resolutions, or votes, for adjourning such house only, excepted) of any kind, for any other purpose whatsoever

— 7 Geo. 3. c. 59

Before the act was implemented, New York reluctantly agreed to provide some of the soldiers' needs, so it was never applied.

=== The Indemnity Act 1767 ===
Tea Act 1767
- Act of Parliament
- Parliament of Great Britain
- Long title: An Act for Taking Off the Inland Duty of One Shilling per Pound Weight upon All Black and Singlo Teas Consumed in Great Britain; and for Granting a Drawback upon the Exportation of Teas to Ireland and the British Dominions in America, for a Limited Time, upon Such Indemnification to Be Made in Respect Thereof by the East India Company, as Is Therein Mentioned; for Permitting the Exportation of Teas in Smaller Quantities Than One Lot to Ireland, or the Said Dominions in America; and for Preventing Teas Seized and Condemned from Being Consumed in Great Britain.
- Citation: 7 Geo. 3. c. 56
- Introduced by: 11 June 1767 Grey Cooper, Secretary to the Treasury (Commons)
- Territorial extent: Great Britain; Ireland; British America

Dates
- Royal assent: 2 July 1767
- Commencement: 5 July 1767
- Expired: 5 July 1772
- Repealed: 15 July 1867
Other legislation
Repealed by	Statute Law Revision Act 1867

Status: Repealed

Text of statute as originally enacted

This act was passed together with the New York Restraining Act, on 2 July 1767.

'Indemnity' means 'security or protection against a loss or other financial burden'. The Indemnity Act 1767 reduced taxes on the East India Company (EIC) when they imported tea into Britain. This allowed them to re-export the tea to the colonies more cheaply and resell it to the American colonies. Until this time, all items had to be shipped to Britain first from wherever they were made and then re-exported to their destination, including to the colonies. This was part of the policy of mercantilism, which stipulated that European countries only allow their colonies to trade with the metropole.

The EIC was one of Britain's largest companies but was on the verge of collapse due to American colonists smuggling cheaper tea purchased from Dutch sellers. Part of the purpose of the entire series of Townshend Acts was to save the company from imploding. Since tea smuggling had become a common and successful practice, Parliament realized how difficult it was to enforce the taxing of tea. The Act stated that no more taxes would be placed on tea, and it made the cost of the East India Company's tea less than tea that was smuggled via Holland. It was an incentive for the colonists to purchase the EIC tea.

=== The Vice Admiralty Court Act 1768 ===
Colonial Trade Act 1768
- Act of Parliament
- Parliament of Great Britain
- Long title: An Act for the more easy and effectual recovery of the penalties and forfeitures inflicted by the acts of parliament relating to the trade or revenues of the British colonies and plantations in America.
- Citation: 8 Geo. 3. c. 22
- Introduced by: 24 February 1768 Lord North, Chancellor of the Exchequer (Commons)
- Territorial extent: Great Britain; British America

Dates
- Royal assent: 8 March 1768
- Commencement: 1 September 1768
- Repealed: 5 July 1825
Other legislation
Repealed by	Customs Law Repeal Act 1825

Status: Repealed

Text of statute as originally enacted

This was the last of the five acts passed. It was not passed until 8 March 1768, the year after the other four. Lord Charles Townshend, the Chancellor of the Exchequer, after whom the Townshend Acts were named, had died suddenly in September 1767, and so did not introduce this act.

The act was passed to aid the prosecution of smugglers. It gave admiralty courts, rather than colonial courts, jurisdiction over all matters concerning customs violations and smuggling. Before the Act, customs violators could be tried in an admiralty court in Halifax, Nova Scotia, if royal prosecutors believed they would not get a favourable outcome using a local judge and jury.

The Vice-Admiralty Court Act added three new admiralty courts in Boston, Philadelphia and Charleston to aid in more effective prosecutions. These courts were run by judges appointed by the Crown and whose salaries were paid, in the first instance, from fines levied. when they found someone guilty.

[...] all forfeitures and penalties inflected by any act or acts of parliament relating to the trade or revenues of the British colonies or plantations in America, may be prosecuted, sued for, and recovered, in any court of vice-admiralty appointed, or to be appointed, and which shall have jurisdiction within the colony, plantation, or place, where the cause of such prosecution or suit shall have arisen. — 8 Geo. 3. c. 22 s. 1

The decisions were made solely by the judge, without the option of trial by jury, which was considered to be a fundamental right of British subjects. In addition, the accused person had to travel to the court of jurisdiction at his own expense; if he did not appear, he was automatically considered guilty.

== Townshend's program ==
=== Raising revenue ===
The first of the Townshend Acts, sometimes simply known as the Townshend Act, was the Revenue Act 1767 (7 Geo 3 c 46). (Note: Also known as the Townshend Revenue Act, the Townshend Duties Act, and the Tariff Act 1767.) This act represented the Chatham ministry's new approach to generating tax revenue in the American colonies after the repeal of the Stamp Act in 1766. The British government had gotten the impression that because the colonists had objected to the Stamp Act on the grounds that it was a direct (or "internal") tax, colonists would therefore accept indirect (or "external") taxes, such as taxes on imports. With this in mind, Charles Townshend, the Chancellor of the Exchequer, devised a plan that placed new duties on paper, paint, lead, glass, and tea that were imported into the colonies. These were items that were not produced in North America and that the colonists were only allowed to buy from Great Britain.

The colonists' objection to "internal" taxes did not mean that they would accept "external" taxes; the colonial position was that any tax laid by Parliament for the purpose of raising revenue was unconstitutional. "Townshend's mistaken belief that Americans regarded internal taxes as unconstitutional and external taxes constitutional", wrote historian John Phillip Reid, "was of vital importance in the history of events leading to the Revolution." The Townshend Revenue Act received royal assent on 29 June 1767. There was little opposition expressed in Parliament at the time. "Never could a fateful measure have had a more quiet passage", wrote historian Peter Thomas.

The Revenue Act was passed in conjunction with the Indemnity Act 1767 (7 Geo 3 c 56), (Note: Also known as the Tea Act 1767.) which was intended to make EIC tea more competitive with smuggled Dutch tea. The Indemnity Act repealed taxes on tea imported to Britain, allowing it to be re-exported more cheaply to the colonies. This tax cut in Britain would be partially offset by the new Revenue Act taxes on tea in the colonies. The Revenue Act also reaffirmed the legality of writs of assistance, or general search warrants, which gave customs officials broad powers to search houses and businesses for smuggled goods.

The original stated purpose of the Townshend duties was to raise a revenue to help pay the cost of maintaining an army in North America. Townshend changed the purpose of the tax plan, however, and instead decided to use the revenue to pay the salaries of some colonial governors and judges. Previously, the colonial assemblies had paid these salaries, but Parliament hoped to take the "power of the purse" away from the colonies. According to historian John C. Miller, "Townshend ingeniously sought to take money from Americans by means of parliamentary taxation and to employ it against their liberties by making colonial governors and judges independent of the assemblies."

Some members of Parliament objected because Townshend's plan was expected to generate only £40,000 in yearly revenue, but he explained that once the precedent for taxing the colonists had been firmly established, the program could gradually be expanded until the colonies paid for themselves. According to historian Peter Thomas, Townshend's "aims were political rather than financial".

=== American Board of Customs Commissioners ===
To better collect the new taxes, the Commissioners of Customs Act 1767 (7 Geo 3 c 41) established the American Board of Customs Commissioners, which was modeled on the British Board of Customs. The board was created because of the difficulties the British Board faced in enforcing trade regulations in the distant colonies. Five commissioners were appointed to the board, which was headquartered in Boston. The American Customs Board would generate considerable hostility in the colonies towards the British government. According to historian Oliver Dickerson, "The actual separation of the continental colonies from the rest of the Empire dates from the creation of this independent administrative board."

The American Board of Customs Commissioners was notoriously corrupt, according to historians. Political scientist Peter Andreas argues:

merchants resented not only the squeeze on smuggling but also the exploits by unscrupulous customs agents that came with it. Such "customs racketeering" was, in the view of colonial merchants, essentially legalized piracy.

Historian Edmund Morgan says:

In the establishment of this American Board of Customs Commissioners, Americans saw the extension of England's corrupt system of officeholding to America. As Professor Dickerson has shown, the Commissioners were indeed corrupt. They engaged in extensive "customs racketeering" and they were involved in many of the episodes of heightened the tension between England and the colonies: it was on their request that troops were sent to Boston; The Boston Massacre took place before their headquarters; the "Gaspee" was operating under their orders.

Historian Doug Krehbiel argues:

Disputes brought to the board were almost exclusively resolved in favor of the British government. Vice admiralty courts claimed to prosecute vigorously smugglers but were widely corrupt—customs officials falsely accused ship owners of possessing undeclared items, thereby seizing the cargoes of entire vessels, and justices of the juryless courts were entitled to a percentage of the goods from colonial ships that they ruled unlawful. Writs of assistance and blanket search warrants to search for smuggled goods were liberally abused. John Hancock, the wealthy New England merchant, had his ship "Liberty" seized in 1768 on a false charge, incensing the colonists. Charges against Hancock were later dropped and his ship returned because of the fear that he would appeal to more scrupulous customs officials in Britain.

Another measure to enforce the trade laws was the Vice Admiralty Court Act 1768 (8 Geo 3 c 22). Although often included in discussions of the Townshend Acts, this act was initiated by the Cabinet when Townshend was not present and was not passed until after his death. Before this act, there was just one vice admiralty court in North America, located in Halifax, Nova Scotia. Established in 1764, this court proved to be too remote to serve all of the colonies, and so the 1768 Vice Admiralty Court Act created four district courts, which were located at Halifax, Boston, Philadelphia, and Charleston. One purpose of the vice admiralty courts, which did not have juries, was to help customs officials prosecute smugglers since colonial juries were reluctant to convict persons for violating unpopular trade regulations.

Townshend also faced the problem of what to do about the New York General Assembly, which had refused to comply with the Quartering Act 1765 because its members saw the act's financial provisions as levying an unconstitutional tax. The New York Restraining Act (7 Geo 3 c 59), (Note: Also known as the New York Suspending Act.) which according to historian Robert Chaffin was "officially a part of the Townshend Acts", suspended the power of the Assembly until it complied with the Quartering Act. The Restraining Act never went into effect because, by the time it was passed, the New York Assembly had already appropriated money to cover the costs of the Quartering Act. The Assembly avoided conceding the right of Parliament to tax the colonies by making no reference to the Quartering Act when appropriating this money; they also passed a resolution stating that Parliament could not constitutionally suspend an elected legislature.

== Reaction ==
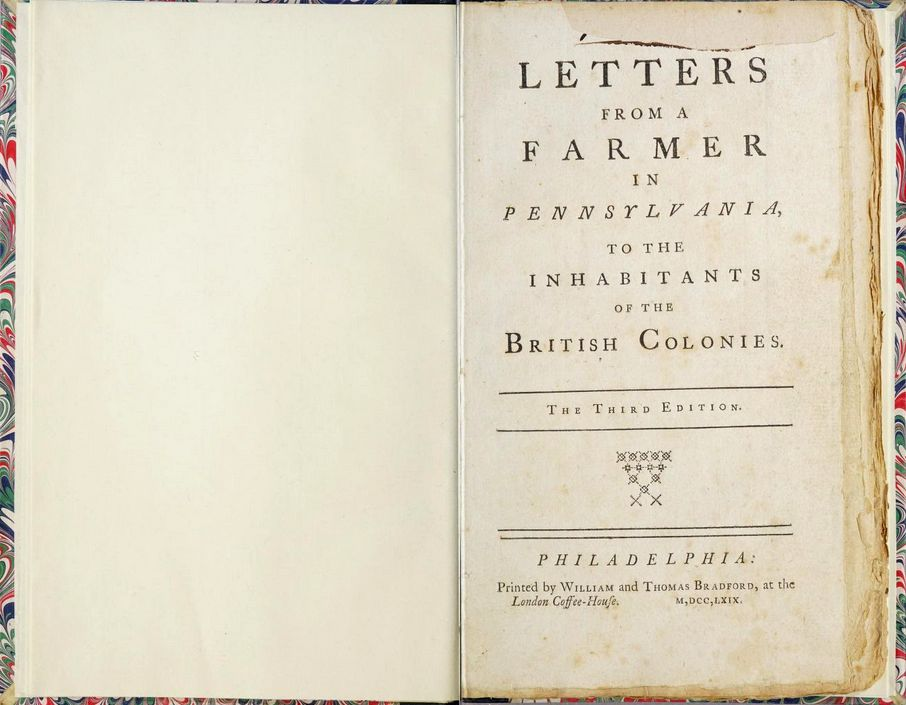
Letters from a Farmer in Pennsylvania Third Edition, MDCCLXIX ( Title page )

Townshend knew that his program would be controversial in the colonies, but he argued that, "The superiority of the mother country can at no time be better exerted than now." The Townshend Acts did not create an instant uproar like the Stamp Act had done two years earlier, but before long, opposition to the programme had become widespread. Townshend did not live to see this reaction, having died suddenly on 4 September 1767.

The most influential colonial response to the Townshend Acts was a series of twelve essays by John Dickinson entitled "Letters from a Farmer in Pennsylvania", which began appearing in December 1767. Ironically, Dickinson had little to do with farming by 1767, as he worked as a lawyer, having studied at the Inns of Court.

Eloquently articulating ideas already widely accepted in the colonies, Dickinson argued that there was no difference between "internal" and "external" taxes, and that any taxes imposed on the colonies by Parliament for the sake of raising a revenue were unconstitutional. Dickinson warned colonists not to concede to the taxes just because the rates were low since this would set a dangerous precedent.

Dickinson sent a copy of his "Letters" to James Otis of Massachusetts, informing Otis that "whenever the Cause of American Freedom is to be vindicated, I look towards the Province of Massachusetts Bay". (Note: Dickinson's letter to Otis was dated 5 December 1767.) The Massachusetts House of Representatives began a campaign against the Townshend Acts by first sending a petition to King George asking for the repeal of the Revenue Act, and then sending a letter to the other colonial assemblies, asking them to join the resistance movement. Upon receipt of the Massachusetts Circular Letter, other colonies also sent petitions to the king. Virginia and Pennsylvania also sent petitions to Parliament, but the other colonies did not, believing that it might have been interpreted as an admission of Parliament's sovereignty over them. Parliament refused to consider the petitions of Virginia and Pennsylvania.

In Great Britain, Lord Hillsborough, who had recently been appointed to the newly created office of Colonial Secretary, was alarmed by the actions of the Massachusetts House. In April 1768 he sent a letter to the colonial governors in America, instructing them to dissolve the colonial assemblies if they responded to the Massachusetts Circular Letter. He also sent a letter to Massachusetts Governor Francis Bernard, instructing him to have the Massachusetts House rescind the Circular Letter. By a vote of 92 to 17, the House refused to comply, and Bernard promptly dissolved the legislature.

When news of the outrage among the colonists finally reached Franklin in London he wrote a number of essays in 1768 calling for "civility and good manners", even though he did not approve of the measures. In 1770, Franklin continued writing essays against the Townshend Acts and Lord Hillsborough and wrote eleven attacking the Acts that appeared in the Public Advertiser, a London daily newspaper. The essays were published between January 8 and February 19, 1770, and can be found in The Papers of Benjamin Franklin.

=== Boycotts ===
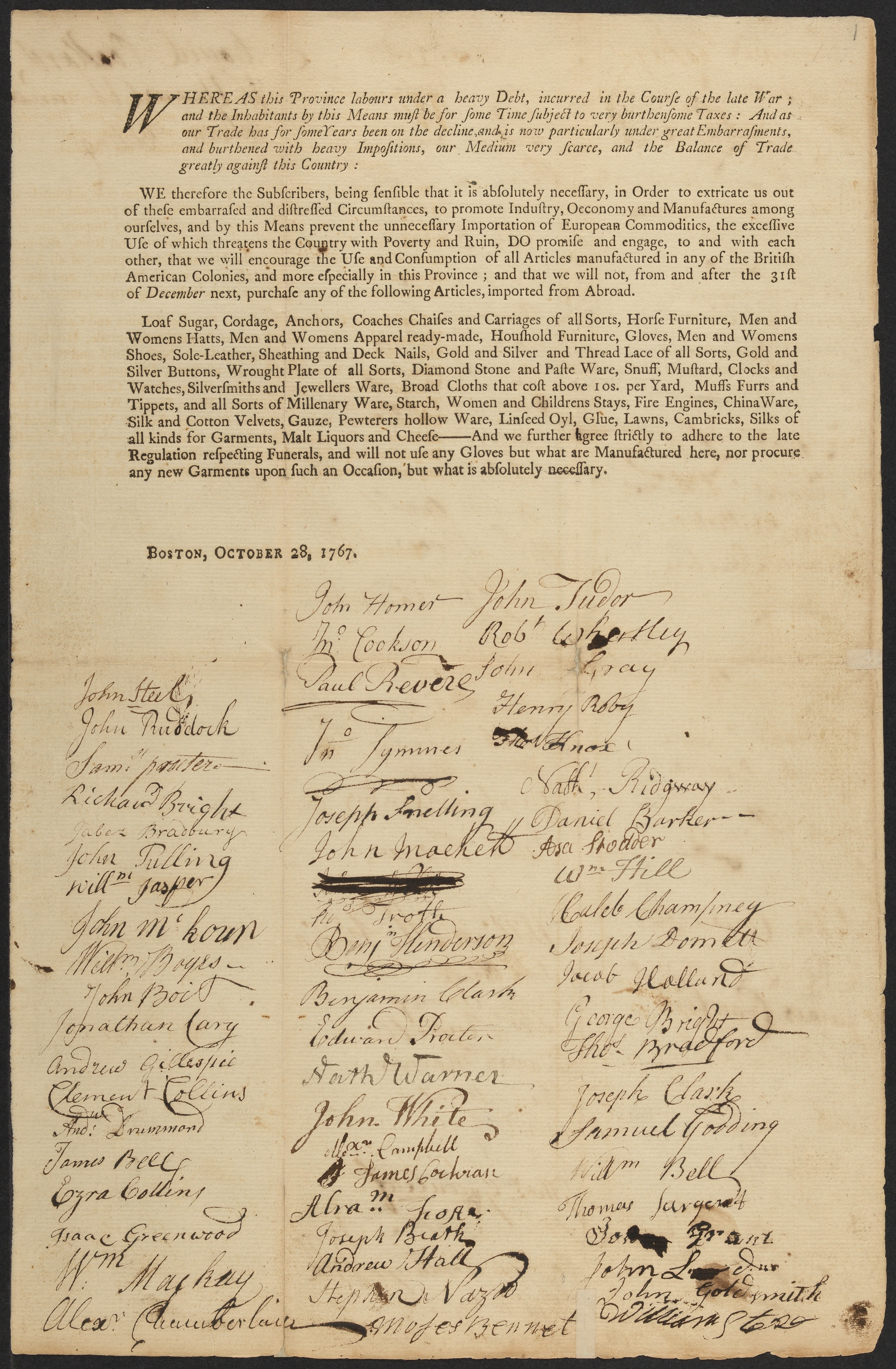
Non-importation agreement, dated October 1767, signed by Bostonians including Paul Revere

Merchants in the colonies, some of them smugglers, organized economic boycotts to put pressure on their British counterparts to work for repeal of the Townshend Acts. Boston merchants organized the first non-importation agreement, which called for merchants to suspend importation of certain British goods effective 1 January 1768. Merchants in other colonial ports, including New York City and Philadelphia, eventually joined the boycott. In Virginia, the non-importation effort was organized by George Washington and George Mason. When the Virginia House of Burgesses passed a resolution stating that Parliament had no right to tax Virginians without their consent, Governor Lord Botetourt dissolved the assembly. The members met at Raleigh Tavern and adopted a boycott agreement known as the "Association".

The non-importation movement was not as effective as promoters had hoped. British exports to the colonies declined by 38 percent in 1769, but there were many merchants who did not participate in the boycott. The boycott movement began to fail by 1770 and came to an end in 1771.

=== Unrest in Boston ===
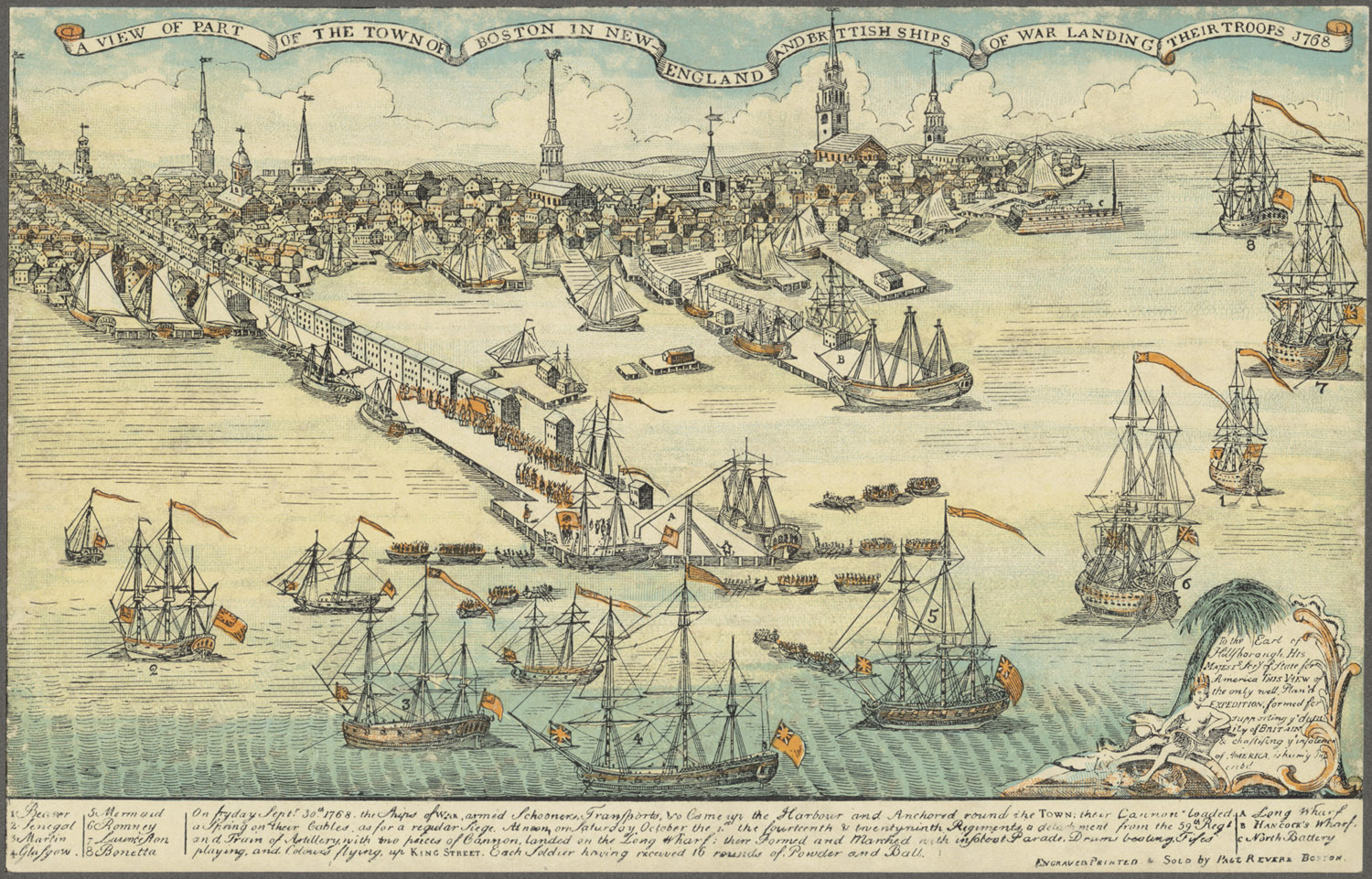
Paul Revere's engraving of British troops landing in Boston in 1768

The newly created American Customs Board was seated in Boston, so it was there that the Board concentrated on enforcing the Townshend Acts. The acts were so unpopular in Boston that the Customs Board requested assistance. Commodore Samuel Hood sent the fifty-gun fourth-rate ship HMS Romney, which arrived in Boston Harbor in May 1768.

On 10 June 1768, customs officials seized the Liberty, a sloop owned by leading Boston merchant John Hancock, on allegations that the ship had been involved in smuggling. Bostonians, already angry because the captain of the Romney had been impressing local sailors, began to riot. Customs officials fled to Castle William for protection. With John Adams serving as his lawyer, Hancock was prosecuted in a highly publicized trial by a vice-admiralty court, but the charges were eventually dropped.

Given the unstable state of affairs in Massachusetts, Hillsborough instructed Governor Bernard to try to find evidence of treason in Boston. Parliament had determined that the Treason Act 1543 was still in force, which would allow Bostonians to be transported to Britain to stand trial for treason. Bernard could find no one who was willing to provide reliable evidence, however, and so there were no treason trials. The possibility that American colonists might be sent to Britain for trial provoked a negative backlash in the colonies.

Even before the Liberty riot, Hillsborough had decided to send troops to Boston. On 8 June 1768, he instructed General Thomas Gage, Commander-in-Chief, North America, to send "such Force as You shall think necessary to Boston", although he conceded that this might lead to "consequences not easily foreseen". Hillsborough suggested that Gage might send one regiment to Boston, but the Liberty incident convinced officials that more than one regiment would be needed.

People in Massachusetts learned in September 1768 that troops were on the way. Samuel Adams organized an emergency, extralegal convention of towns and passed resolutions against the imminent occupation of Boston, but on 1 October 1768, the first of four regiments of the British Army began disembarking in Boston, and the Customs Commissioners returned to town. The "Journal of Occurrences", an anonymously written series of newspaper articles, chronicled clashes between civilians and soldiers during the military occupation of Boston, apparently with some exaggeration. Tensions rose after Christopher Seider, a Boston teenager, was killed by a customs employee on 22 February 1770. Although British soldiers were not involved in that incident, resentment against the occupation escalated in the days that followed, resulting in the killing of five civilians in the Boston Massacre of 5 March 1770. After the incident, the troops were withdrawn to Castle William.

== Partial repeal ==
Customs Act 1770
- Act of Parliament
- Parliament of Great Britain
- Long title: An Act so repeal so much of an Act, made in the Seventh Year of His present Majesty's Reign, intituled, "An Act for granting certain Duties in the British Colonies and Plantations in America; for allowing a Drawback of the Duties of Customs upon the Exportation from this Kingdom of Coffee and Cocoa Nuts of the Produce of the said Colonies or Plantations; for discontinuing the Drawbacks payable on China Earthen Ware exported to America; and for more effectually preventing the clandestine Running of Goods in the said Colonies and Plantations," as relates to the Duties upon Glass, Red-lead, White-lead, Painters Colours, Paper, Paste-boards, Mill-boards, and Scale-boards, of the Produce or Manufacture of Great Britain, imported into any of His Majesty's Colonies in America; and also to the discontinuing the Drawbacks payable on China Earthen Ware exported to America; and for regulating the Exportation thereof.
- Citation: 10 Geo. 3. c 17
- Territorial extent: Great Britain

Dates
- Royal assent: 12 April 1770
- Commencement: 1 December 1770
- Repealed: 15 July 1867
Other legislation
Amends	Duties on Tea, etc. (American Plantations) Act 1766
Repealed by	Statute Law Revision Act 1867

Status: Repealed

Text of statute as originally enacted

On 5 March 1770—the same day as the Boston Massacre, although news traveled slowly at the time, and neither side of the Atlantic was aware of this coincidence—Lord North, the new Prime Minister, presented a motion in the House of Commons that called for partial repeal of the Townshend Revenue Act. Although some in Parliament advocated a complete repeal of the act, North disagreed, arguing that the tea duty should be retained to assert "the right of taxing the Americans". After debate, the Repeal Act (10 Geo 3 c 17) received royal assent on 12 April 1770.

Historian Robert Chaffin argued that little had actually changed:

It would be inaccurate to claim that a major part of the Townshend Acts had been repealed. The revenue-producing tea levy, the American Board of Customs and, most important, the principle of making governors and magistrates independent all remained. In fact, the modification of the Townshend Duties Act was scarcely any change at all.

The Townshend duty on tea was retained when the 1773 Tea Act was passed, which allowed the East India Company to ship tea directly to the colonies. The Boston Tea Party soon followed, which set the stage for the American Revolution.

== Bibliography ==
- Andreas, Peter (2012). Smuggler Nation: How Illicit Trade Made America.
- Brunhouse, Robert Levere (1930). "The Effect of the Townshend Acts in Pennsylvania". Pennsylvania Magazine of History and Biography. 54 (4): 355–373. JSTOR 20086751.
- Chaffin, Robert J. (1999) [1991]. "The Townshend Acts crisis, 1767–1770". In Greene, Jack P.; Pole, Jack R. (eds.). The Blackwell Encyclopedia of the American Revolution. Malden, Massachusetts: Blackwell. ISBN 978-1-55786-547-2.
- Dickerson, Oliver M. (1951). The Navigation Acts and the American Revolution. Philadelphia: University of Pennsylvania Press. ISBN 978-0-8122-1077-4.
- Dickerson, Oliver M. (March 1946). "John Hancock: Notorious Smuggler or Near Victim of British Revenue Racketeers?". Mississippi Valley Historical Review. 32 (4): 517–540. doi:10.2307/1895239. JSTOR 1895239.
- Farrand, Max (January 1898). "The Taxation of Tea, 1767-1773". The American Historical Review. 3 (2): 266–269. doi:10.2307/1832503. JSTOR 1832503.
- Franklin, Benjamin (1969). Labaree, Leonard W. (ed.). The Papers of Benjamin Franklin. Vol. XVII. New Haven: Yale University Press.
- Isaacson, Walter (2004). Benjamin Franklin: An American Life. New York: Simon & Schuster. ISBN 978-0-684-80761-4.
- Knollenberg, Bernhard (1975). Growth of the American Revolution, 1766–1775. New York: Free Press. ISBN 978-0-02-917110-3.
- Krehbiel, Doug (2005). "British Empire and the Atlantic World". In Finkelman, Paul (ed.). Encyclopedia of the New American Nation. Vol. 1: The Emergence of the United States, 1754–1829.
- Labaree, Benjamin Woods (1979) [1964]. The Boston Tea Party. Boston: Northeastern University Press. ISBN 978-0-930350-05-5.
- Jensen, Merrill (1968). The Founding of a Nation: A History of the American Revolution, 1763–1776. New York: Oxford University Press.
- Levy, Leonard W. (1995). Seasoned Judgments. Transaction Publishers. ISBN 978-1-4128-3382-0.
- Morgan, Edmund S. (1978). The Challenge of the American Revolution. W. W. Norton. ISBN 978-0-393-00876-0.
- Miller, John C. (1959). Origins of the American Revolution. Stanford University Press.
- Pickering, Danby (1767). The Statutes at Large. Vol. 27 Being the Fifth Session of the Twelfth Parliament of Great Britain. Cambridge, UK: Cambridge University Press.
- Pickering, Danby (1768). The Statutes at Large. Vol. 28 Part 1: Being the Seventh Session of the Twelfth Parliament of Great Britain. Cambridge, UK: Cambridge University Press.
- Reid, John Phillip (1979). In a Rebellious Spirit: The Argument of Facts, the Liberty Riot, and the Coming of the American Revolution. University Park: Pennsylvania State University Press. ISBN 978-0-271-00202-6.
- Reid, John Phillip (1987). Constitutional History of the American Revolution, II: The Authority to Tax. Madison: University of Wisconsin Press. ISBN 978-0-299-11290-5.
- Thomas, Peter D. G. (1987). The Townshend Duties Crisis: The Second Phase of the American Revolution, 1767–1773. Oxford: Oxford University Press. ISBN 978-0-19-822967-4.
- Varga, Nicolas (July 1956). "The New York Restraining Act: Its Passage and Some Effects, 1766-1768". New York History. 37 (3). New York State Historical Association: 233–256. JSTOR 23153870.
- Journal of the House of Commons. Vol. 31: November the 11th, 1766 to March the 10th, 1768. London: House of Commons. 1803 [1768].
- Journal of the House of Lords. Vol. 31, 1765–1767. London: His Majesty's Stationery Office. 1830 [1767].
- Journal of the House of Lords. Vol. 32, 1768–1770. London: His Majesty's Stationery Office. 1830 [1770].
