= Column (periodical) =

Recurring piece or article in a periodical

A column is a recurring article in a newspaper, magazine or other publication, in which a writer expresses their own opinion in a section allotted to them on a regular basis by the publication. The author of a column is a columnist.

== Characteristics ==
Columns do not take a specific form; they may be narratives, essays, anecdotes, reviews, commentaries on current events, announcements, games or advertisements. Columns may cover any subject, but once a columnist chooses a subject they usually stick to it throughout their career. A column may engage in polemics, analyse an issue, give advice to the reader (in which case they are advice columns), respond to readers' comments (in which case they are correspondence columns) or mock public figures. Columnists may support the points they make with facts and statistics, but unlike hard news they do not usually give opposing viewpoints as much consideration or coverage as their own. Columns often use humour. They differ from editorials in that they express their authors' opinions whereas editorials express their publications'. The impression that a columnist gives off in their column is not necessarily their actual personality; columnists tend to develop personas.

Columns are published on a regular basis (usually weekly, but sometimes daily or monthly) in the same section in the same publication (which can be a newspaper, a magazine, a newsletter or a website), and their authors may be either guest writers or members of the publication's staff. A column may be written by a single person or by a group of people. A column may be syndicated, in which case the columnist, or the column's primary newspaper, sells the column to multiple newspapers that will also publish it; often the newspapers that buy syndicated columns do so because they cannot afford to hire columnists. Newspaper columns are on the reverse side of the first page. Columns are bylined, and some columns are accompanied by a picture of the columnist. Columns range from 500 to 1200 words, with newspaper columns falling on the short side of that scale and magazine columns falling on the long side. Columns are sometimes compiled retrospectively by their news organisations and sold as books.

== History ==
Journalists in England in the 1640s, during the English Civil War, wrote and published advocacy pieces in their newsbooks and pamphlets that were structurally similar to present-day columns; among these was a "society column", written by a Czech correspondent, that Marchamont Nedham included in his newsbooks. The items column, a common gossip column format composed of a list of news items and comments from the columnist, was invented by English publisher Benjamin Harris (fl. 1673–1716) in the 17th or 18th century. The Athenian Mercury, which ran in the 1690s, contained the first advice column; it answered readers' questions about science and philosophy. English writers Joseph Addison (1672–1719) and Richard Steele (d. 1729) created a type of satirical column that was based on, and read like, oral history. The first column to be published in a newspaper was that of John Hill (under the pseudonym "The Inspector"), in the London Advertiser and the Literary Gazette, starting in 1751. The Journal of Occurrences, which from 1768 to 1769 was published throughout the American colonies by patriots from Boston in protest of the British Crown, was the first syndicated column in what is now the United States.

Among the first correspondence columns was that run by James Gordon Bennett Sr., founder of the New York Herald, starting in 1835. Some humourists, like Eugene Field for the Chicago Daily News, wrote humour columns for newspapers in the late 19th century. In the United Kingdom through the mid-to-late 19th century, newspaper editors and employees like George Reynolds, his brother Edward Reynolds and F. E. Tomlins wrote political columns for their newspapers (in their cases, Reynolds Newspaper for the former two and the Weekly Times for the latter), and Sunday papers ran very popular advice columns.

The commercialisation of journalism by the 20th century increased the separation between columnists and their readers and caused columns to, in general and except for advice columns, grow more impersonal. During World War I (1914–1918), many British journalists published columns in rebuke of political figures, such as H. H. Asquith and Richard Haldane, and faced no consequences despite Lord Chancellor Stanley Buckmaster's proclamation that he would censor "any information likely to depress".

In the early 20th century in Spain, Eugeni d'Ors invented a type of column, a glosa, that consisted of several brief aphorisms, the last of which would often reveal the column's political point. Around the same time in the United States, journalists who had emigrated from Latin America wrote crónicas, brief Spanish-language columns about local matters, for Hispanic newspapers; these columns took their style from Latin American folklore and oral history and were also inspired by Addison and Steele's columns.

Columns did not become a ubiquitous part of American newspapers until the 1920s, when publishers realised that adding "feature and filler material" to their newspapers would increase their profits, and when readers who were too inundated with news to discern which events were important began wanting journalists to give them their own commentary on events. Also in the 1920s, American journalist Walter Winchell wrote the "first nationally syndicated gossip column" and thereby established the gossip column as a genre; other gossip columnists like Hedda Hopper followed and drew even more readers to the genre. The column's "golden age", during which columns were at their most ubiquitous and popular, was in the 1930s and 1940s; journalism as a whole had become uniformly objective since the Progressive Era, so newspapers employed opinionated columnists to distinguish themselves from other newspapers.

Since the advent of the internet in the 1990s and 2000s, the news cycle has shortened. Many news outlets have, in a bid to keep up with their readers' interests, stopped running syndicated columns and replaced them with local columnists; but others have replaced their staff and syndicated columns with guest columns written by "public officials and advocacy groups" instead. Because print newspapers have declined in readership and profitability, most contemporary journalists and news organisations publish their work online and through social media; online columns are often blogs run on journalism websites. Gossip columns have largely disappeared from newspapers since the late 20th century; newspapers now prefer to report objectively on controversial events.

== See also ==
- Opinion journalism – Type of journalism
- Causerie – Literary style of short informal essays
- Feuilleton – Newspaper section

== Works cited ==
- Hinkle, Olin; Henry, John (1952). "How to Write Columns". www.iastatedigitalpress.com. Iowa State College Press. doi:10.31274/isudp.1952.36.
- Ward, William G. (1969). The Student Journalist and THINKING EDITORIALS. Richards Rosen Press, Inc.
- Franklin, Bob (2008). Pulling newspapers apart: analysing print journalism. London: Routledge. ISBN 978-0-203-63070-9.
- Raskin, Julie; Males, Carolyn (1987). How to Write & Sell a Column. Writer's Digest Books. ISBN 0-89879-295-9.
- Seguín, Bécquer (2024). The op-ed novel: a literary history of post-Franco Spain (First printing ed.). Cambridge, Massachusetts London, England: Harvard University Press. ISBN 978-0-674-29481-3.
- Boyce, George; Curran, James; Wingate, Pauline (1978). Newspaper history from the seventeenth century to the present day. Communication and society series. London Beverly Hills, Calif: Constable Sage. ISBN 978-0-09-462310-1.
- Grey, Elizabeth (1969). The Story of Journalism. Houghton Mifflin Company.
- Clark, Charles E.; Nord, David Paul; Baldasty, Gerald J.; Schudson, Michael; Ghiglione, Loren (1991) [1990]. Hench, John B. (ed.). Three Hundred Years of the American Newspaper. American Antiquarian Society.
- Standring, Suzette Martinez (2008). The art of column writing: insider secrets from Art Buchwald, Dave Barry, Arianna Huffington, Pete Hamill and other great columnists. Portland, Or: Marion Street Press. ISBN 978-1-933338-26-2.
- Siapera, Eugenia; Veglis, Andreas, eds. (2012). The handbook of global online journalism. Handbooks in communication and media. Malden, MA: Wiley-Blackwell. ISBN 978-1-4443-3855-3.
