= Journal of Occurrences =

The Journal of Occurrences, also known as Journal of the Times and Journal of Transactions in Boston, was a series of newspaper articles published from 1768 to 1769 in the New York Journal and Packet and other newspapers, chronicling the occupation of Boston by the British Army. Authorship of the articles was anonymous, but is usually attributed to Samuel Adams, then the clerk of the Massachusetts House of Representatives. William Cooper, Boston's town clerk, has also been named as a possible author. The articles may have been written by a group of people working in collaboration.

== History ==
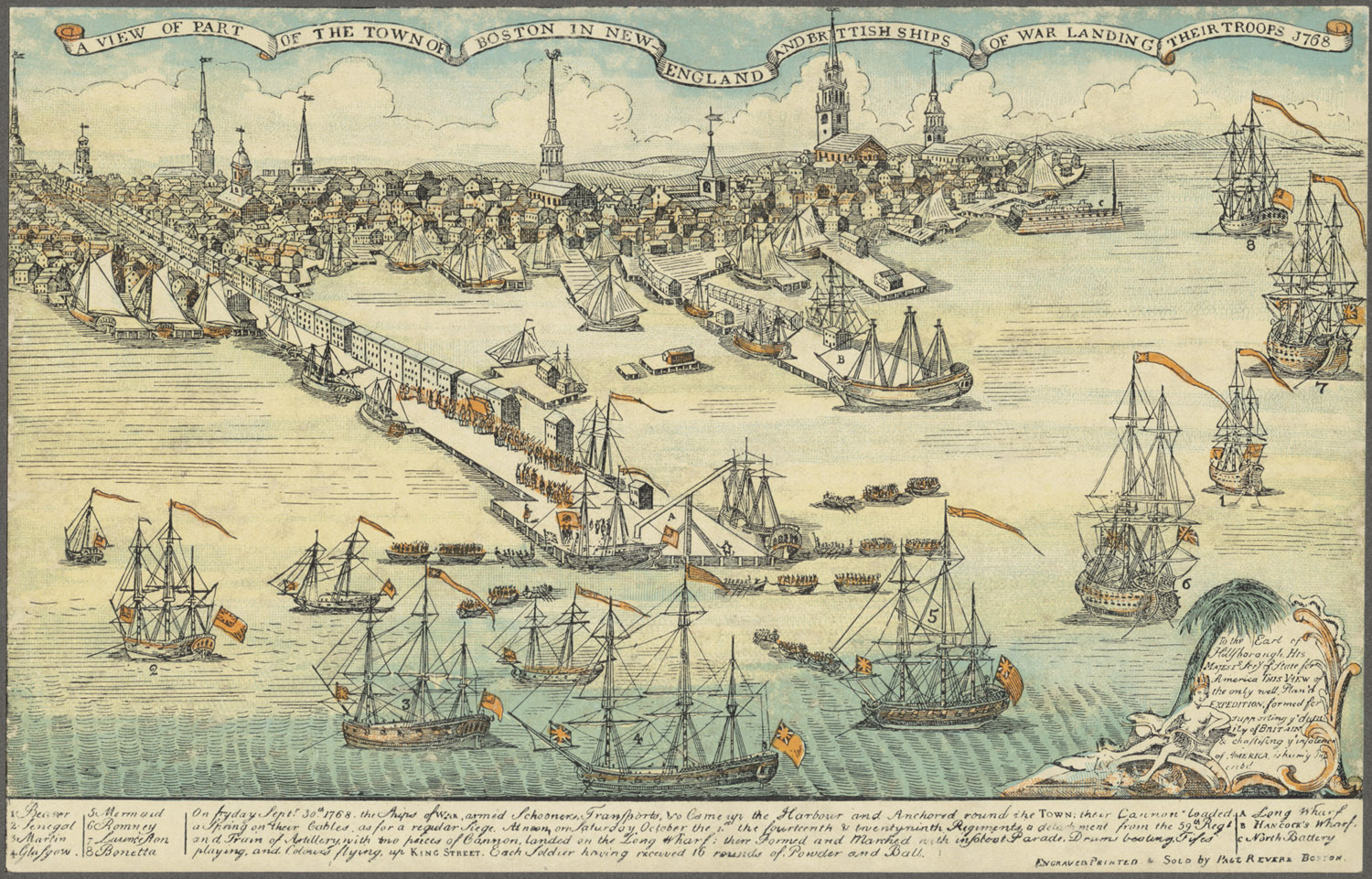
Paul Revere's engraving of British troops landing in Boston in 1768.

The occupation of Boston arose from colonial resistance to the Townshend Acts, passed by the British Parliament in 1767. In response to the acts, the Massachusetts House of Representatives issued the Massachusetts Circular Letter in February 1768. Also written primarily by Samuel Adams, the circular letter argued that the Townshend Acts were a violation of the British Constitution because they taxed British subjects without their having a say in the matter. Lord Hillsborough, British Secretary of State for the colonies, ordered the Massachusetts House to revoke the circular letter. But the legislature refused. In addition to this act of colonial defiance, Hillsborough also heard reports from the Board of Customs—who were in charge of enforcing trade regulations—that Boston was in a state of anarchy. The British ministry dispatched four regiments of the British Army to restore order. These troops began arriving on October 1, 1768.

The first installment of the Journal, covering the period of September 28 to October 3, 1768, was published on October 13, 1768, and was titled Journal of Transactions in Boston. Subsequent issues appeared once a week, with an average lapse of about twelve days between the reported events and the date of publication. Copy was secretly sent from Boston to New York for publication in the New York Journal on Thursday, then reprinted on Saturday in the Pennsylvania Chronicle; it was then printed in the Boston Evening Transcript, and copied in many other American newspapers and publications. The title changed several times, with the New York papers most often using Journal of Occurrences and the Boston papers preferring Journal of the Times.

In an innovative approach for an era without professional newspaper reporters, the Journal presented a narrative of events in Boston to the outside world. Their articles primary focused on the many grievances held by Bostonians toward the military occupation, including its subversion of civil authority and alleged misbehavior by occupational troops. The Journal also criticized the impressment of colonial sailors into the Royal Navy. Local customs officers were also portrayed in a negative light by the articles. The authors of the articles claimed that what they wrote was "strictly fact", while British officials in Boston insisted that it was mostly fiction.

Historian Richard Frothingham Jr. claimed that William Cooper, the town clerk, did most of the writing; Governor Francis Bernard attributed it to Samuel Adams and his associates. Other possible authors include Henry Knox, who was running a bookstore at the time; Benjamin Edes, co-publisher of the Boston Gazette; William Greenleaf, an employee of Edes; and Isaiah Thomas, who started out as a printer's apprentice and went on to publish the Massachusetts Spy. Historian Oliver M. Dickerson suggests that John Adams or Josiah Quincy II helped with the legal material, such as the discussion of the writs of assistance in April 1769.

Bernard complained in a letter to Lord Hillsborough that "if the Devil himself was of the party, as he virtually is, there could not have been got together a greater collection of impudent, virulent, and seditious lies, perversions of the truth, and misrepresentations, than are to be found in this publication." Dickerson writes in his introduction to the collected articles that it "doubtless" contains exaggerations, but that most of the allegations are supported by letters and other contemporary documents. In any case, the articles helped build the sentiment that eventually produced the American Revolution.

== See also ==
- Massachusetts Convention of Towns
- Manufactory House
- Timeline of Boston
