= Samuel Tudor =

- Born: 1769; East Windsor, Colony of Connecticut
- Died: January 29, 1862; Hartford, Connecticut, U.S.
- Occupations: Entrepreneur, merchant, philanthropist
- Spouse: Mary Watson (1775 - 1847)
- Parent(s): Samuel Tudor, III; Naomi Diggens

Samuel Tudor IV, Esq. (1769–1862) was a nineteenth-century American entrepreneur, business and civic leader of Hartford, Connecticut. He was a founding director of Aetna Insurance Company, the Phoenix National Bank and the Society of Savings Bank of Hartford, as well as a founding trustee and major early benefactor of Trinity College. Tudor was also connected with the establishment of many of the leading institutions of that city. He was a director of the American Asylum School for the Deaf, the oldest permanent school for the deaf in the U.S., and a co-founder of the Hartford Academy.

== Background and family ==
Tudor was born in East Windsor, in Connecticut Colony, in 1769, son of Samuel Tudor, III, and Naomi Diggens. His father was called to the Lexington Alarm as a lieutenant in the Connecticut militia, while his uncle, Dr. Elihu Tudor, was a loyalist and intimate friend of loyalist Governor William Franklin of New Jersey. Elihu was a preeminent surgeon who attended to British General James Wolfe at the Battle of Quebec. Tudor’s grandfather, Samuel, Jr, was a Yale-educated Presbyterian minister. The family descended from Owen Tudor, a founder of Hartford who was in Connecticut by 1645 and who made unsubstantiated claims to be related to the British monarchs.

Samuel IV, who was also commonly known as Samuel Tudor, Jr., married Mary Watson, daughter of John Watson, a wealthy Windsor, Connecticut, merchant, and Ann Bliss. John Watson was a second cousin of Connecticut Governor Jonathan Trumbull, Jr., and of his brother, the celebrated Revolutionary War painter, John Trumbull. With Watson, Tudor had 2 sons, William Watson, who married Mary Dalrymple Bruce, great-granddaughter of General Samuel Barwick II, Governor of Barbados; and Henry Samuel Tudor, who married Mary Rowe Bradley, daughter of U.S. Senator Stephen Rowe Bradley, and sister of William Czar Bradley, U.S. Representative, both of Vermont.

== Merchant and founder of banks and insurance companies ==
Samuel was a prosperous importer and wholesale and retail dry goods merchant, with interests in several firms, including Tudor, Woodbridge & Co, established in 1805, one of the largest in Hartford. In 1814 he joined with 2 other partners to found the Phoenix Bank, which became one of the largest banks in Connecticut. He served as director and briefly as president of that bank. He was one of the first shareholders of the Hartford Fire Insurance Company, which today is known as The Hartford, and later was elected to the founding board of directors of the Aetna Insurance Company in 1819, the second insurance company to be created in Hartford County. He served on Aetna's board of directors for forty-three years, virtually for the balance of his life. Aetna was closely allied with Phoenix Bank and was to become the largest life insurance company in the world. Tudor and his fellow board of directors appointed Aetna’s first president, Thomas K. Brace. Tudor was also a founding trustee of the Society of Savings, the first savings bank in Connecticut.

== Tudor and Trinity College (CT) ==
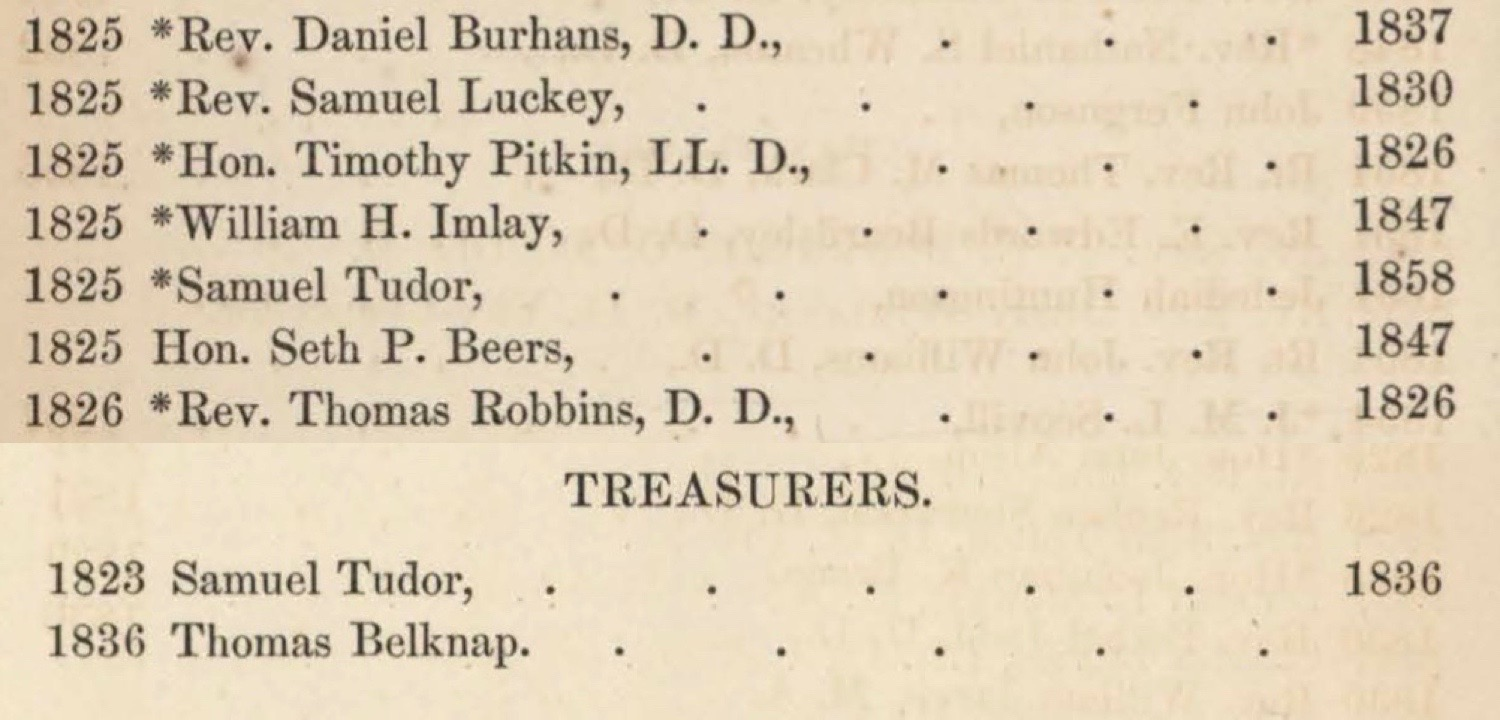
Catalogue of Trinity College, 1862

Samuel Tudor served as Trinity College's Treasurer from 1823 to 1836, and he later remained as a member of Trustees from 1825 until 1858. Tudor was one of the founding member of Trinity, who helped this institution to collect and secure fundings to thrive its first decade. He was also a very generous and continuous donor to the college until his death in 1862.

== Tudor and slavery ==
Samuel Tudor was a slave owner according to the 1810 United States census, and the twelfth column of the chart indicates he owned a slave. The later 1820 United States census suggests he no longer own a slave.

In 21st century, Aetna confessed that they sold slave policies to the slave owners after 1853, when Tudor had been serving as the director of the company for over thirty years from 1819. Samuel Tudor should be one of the responsible parties of Aetna to sell the policies of slaves.

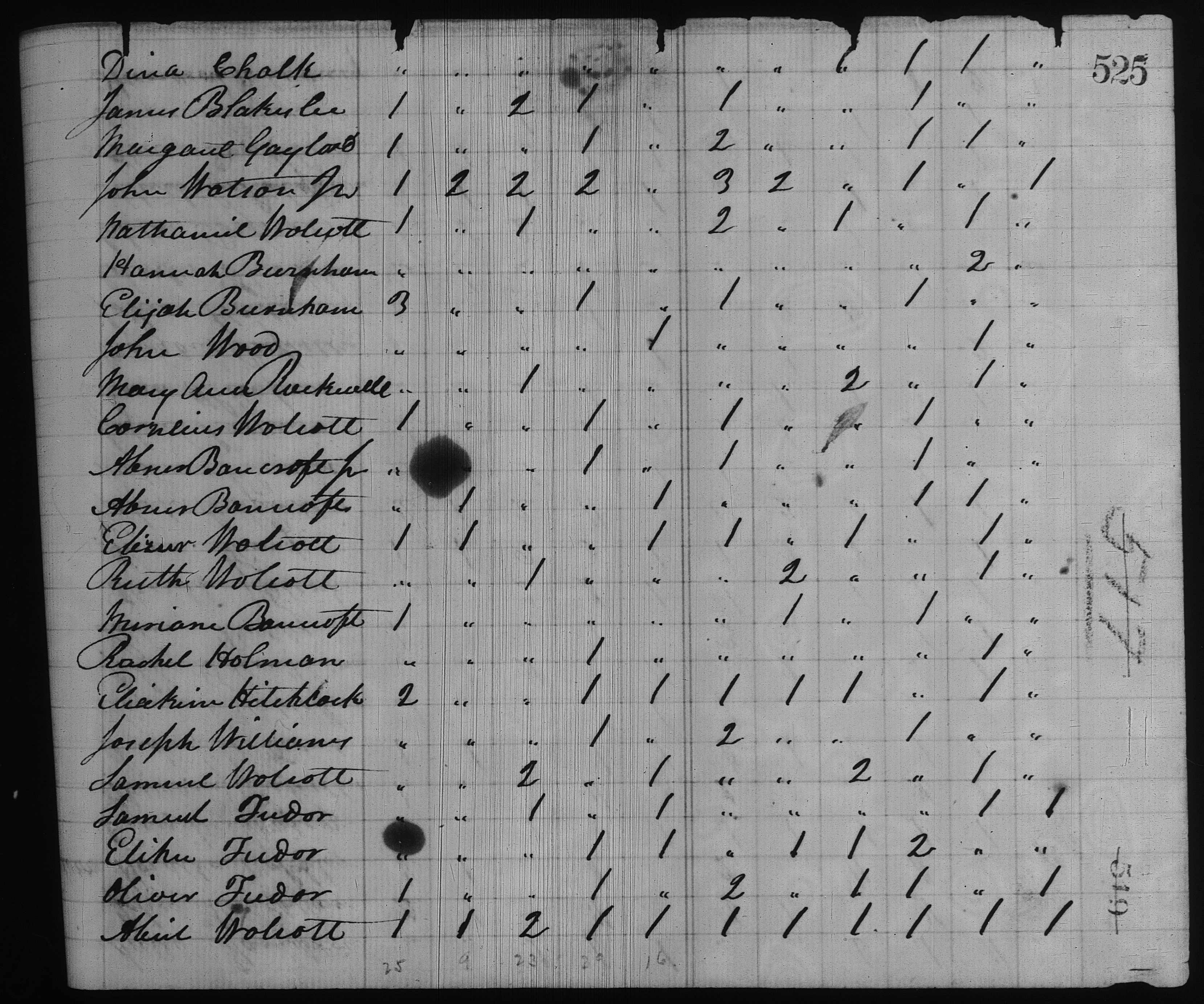
The 1810 United States census

== Philanthropy ==
Tudor was for 47 years a member of the vestry of and a major financial contributor to Christ Church in Hartford. He played a leading role in the expansion of the church in 1827, his committee retaining the prominent architect, Ithiel Towne for the Gothic Revival design. In 1983, Christ Church Cathedral was listed in the National Register of Historic Places.

He served on a committee with 2 other parishioners that participated in the founding of Washington College, later renamed Trinity College. Trinity is the second oldest college in Connecticut after Yale. As noted on the College's website, Tudor made large contributions to the institution. He additionally served for several years as its first treasurer and as a trustee.

== Personal life ==
Tudor owned a large property on Main Street in Hartford that included a private greenhouse, ice house, and extensive ornamental and fruit gardens, which were said to be worthy as a destination for visitors to the city. He also enjoyed a reputation as a skilled musician. He lived to be 92.

The celebrated nineteenth-century American poet, Lydia Sigourney was the wife of Tudor’s longtime business partner and friend, Charles Sigourney, president of Phoenix Bank. She published a memorial poem of Tudor in 1862. Of him she wrote:

... And so, for more than ninety years
Flow'd on his cloudless span,
In love of Nature, and of Art,
And kindred love for man,
Our oldest patriarch, kind and true,
To all our City dear,
His cordial tones, his greeting words
No more on earth we hear. . .
