= Summit Bancorp =

American bank

- Industry: Banking
- Founded: 1899; 127 years ago
- Defunct: 2001; 25 years ago
- Fate: Acquired by FleetBoston Financial
- Headquarters: Summit, New Jersey
- Key people: T. Joseph Semrod (chairman, CEO & president); William J. Healy (CFO)
- Revenue: ▲$1.266 billion (2013)
- Net income: ▼$0.471 billion (2013)
- Total assets: ▲$36.379 billion (1999)
- Total equity: ▲$2.802 billion (1999)
- Number of employees: 8,673

Summit Bancorp was a bank based in Summit, New Jersey, that operated in New Jersey, Pennsylvania, and Connecticut. In 2001, it was acquired by FleetBoston Financial.

== History ==
The bank was organized in 1899. In 1909, the bank was reorganized as The Summit Trust Company (see https://www.encyclopedia.com/books/politics-and-business-magazines/summit-bancorporation)

In 1968, the bank organized a Pennsylvania entity.

In 1994, the company acquired the Bankers Corporation and the Crestmont Financial Corporation.

In 1995, the company was acquired by UJB Financial Corporation, who had been doing business as United Jersey Bank. The combined bank continued to do business as Summit Bank after the merger.

In 1996, the company acquired B.M.J. Financial Corporation for $164.5 million in stock.

In 1997, the company acquired Collective Bancorp.

In 1998, the company acquired NSS Bancorp and New Canaan Bank and Trust Company.

In February 1999, the company acquired Prime Bancorp.

In November 1999, the company announced layoffs of 250 people.

In 2001, the company was acquired by FleetBoston Financial for $7 billion in stock. As part of the transaction, the company's trust business was sold to The Bank of New York Mellon. In 2004, Fleet was acquired by Bank of America.
