= Massachusetts Circular Letter =

1768 political document

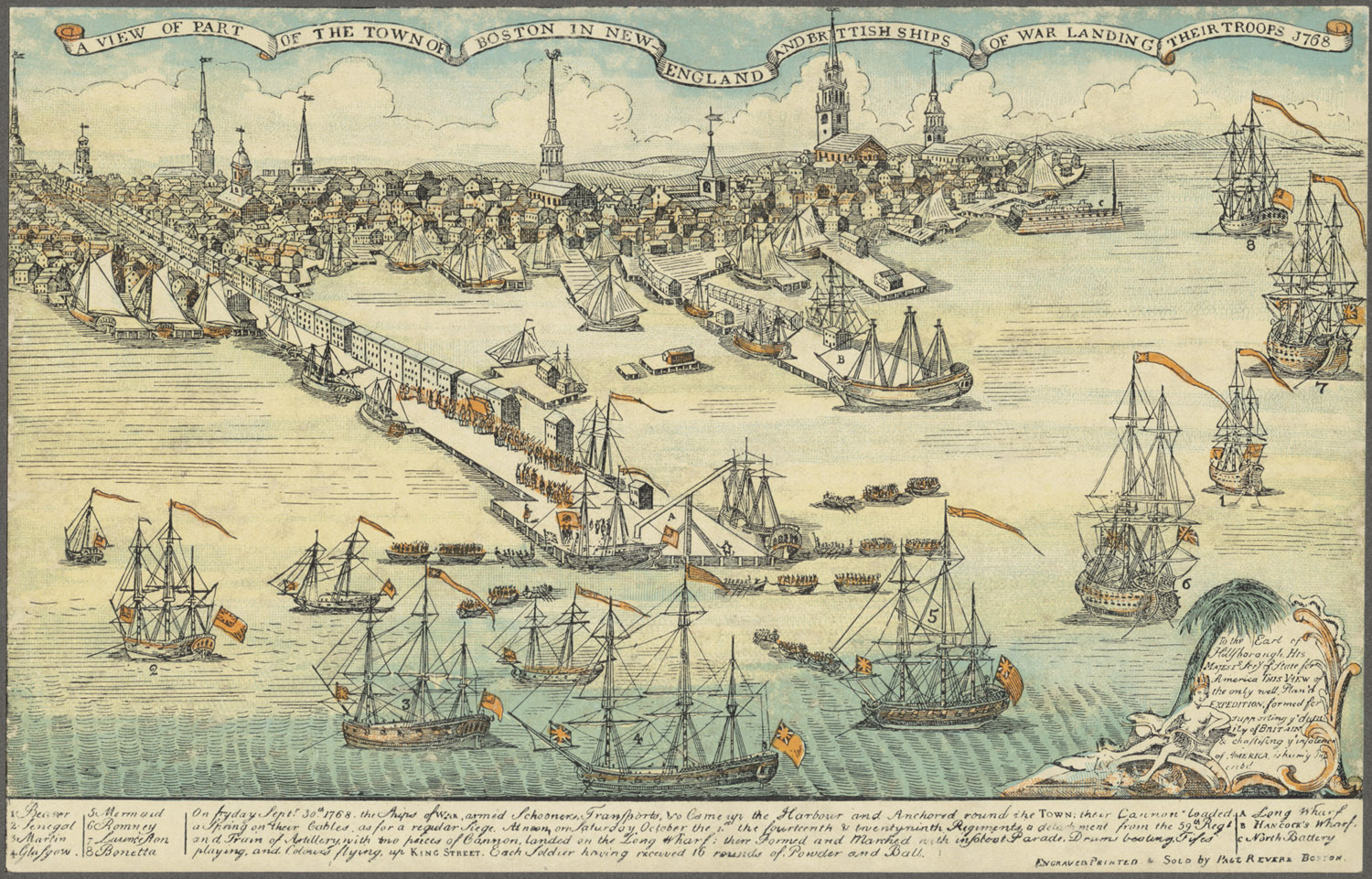
Paul Revere's engraving of British troops landing in Boston in response to events set off by the Circular Letter.

The Massachusetts Circular Letter was a statement written by Samuel Adams and James Otis Jr., and passed by the Massachusetts House of Representatives in the Province of Massachusetts Bay in February 1768 in response to the Townshend Acts. Reactions to the letter included mob violence and attacks on customs officials. In response, Parliament sent some troops to maintain order. The presence of troops contributed to the coming American Revolution.

== Background ==
After the Stamp Act was repealed in 1766, the British Parliament imposed the Townshend Acts in 1767 as another way of generating revenue. The acts placed an import duty on glass, paint, paper, lead, and tea as well as establishing an American Board of Customs. In response, the Massachusetts General Court issued a circular letter. (A circular letter, also known as a circular, is a letter meant to be widely distributed, or "circulated".) The Massachusetts Circular Letter was sent to the representative bodies of the other colonies. Massachusetts received positive responses from New Jersey, Connecticut, and the Virginia House of Burgesses. It was, however, largely ignored in Nova Scotia.

== The letter ==
In the Circular Letter, Samuel Adams argued that the Townshend Acts were unconstitutional because the colony of Massachusetts was not represented in Parliament. Adams maintained that Parliament's status as the supreme legislative body of the British Empire did not permit it to violate the British Constitution and the natural rights of the colonists. Adams made it clear that he was not advocating colonial representation in Parliament: because the American Colonies were "separated by an ocean of a thousand leagues" from Great Britain, he thought it was impractical for them to be properly represented in Parliament. Instead, Adams argued in favor of the previous arrangement, where the colonies were taxed only by their own provincial assemblies in which they were already represented.

== Consequences ==
After the Circular Letter had been passed and issued to other colonies, Lord Hillsborough, Secretary of State for the Colonies, ordered the Massachusetts General Court to revoke it. The body voted 92-17 not to do so. In response to the General Court's defiance, Governor Francis Bernard dissolved the assembly. This led to an outbreak of mob violence from colonists who no longer had any legal way to deal with their grievances. They attacked customs officials, making it impossible for them to perform their duties. In response to the deteriorating situation, Lord Hillsborough sent four regiments of British soldiers to Boston. Arriving in October 1768, the soldiers only increased the tensions, as recorded in the anonymously penned "Journal of Occurrences", which chronicled the occupation. These tensions culminated on March 5, 1770 with the Boston Massacre.
