= Phineas Stearns =

Revolutionary War Captain and Activist

Phineas Stearns (February 5, 1736 – March 27, 1798) was a farmer and blacksmith from Watertown, Massachusetts. In 1773 he participated in the Boston Tea Party. He was also a soldier in the American Revolutionary Army at Lake George (1756) and the leader of a company of militiamen at Dorchester Heights during the Siege of Boston. His efforts in the Battles of Lexington and Concord earned him the rank of captain.

Stearns declined a colonel's commission due to the poor health of his wife, Hannah Bemis, who left five children in his care when she passed. He later married Bemis' cousin, Esther Sanderson. His career in public service ended in 1776. He died on March 27, 1798. In 1884 historian Francis Samuel Drake wrote, "[Stearns] was distinguished for his benevolent and cheerful disposition, and for strong common sense and strict integrity."

== Bibliography ==
- Boston Tea Party Museum.com
- Daughters of the American Revolution (1899). Lineage Book - National Society of the Daughters of the American Revolution. Vol. 9. Daughters of the American Revolution.
- Denehy, John William (1906). A History of Brookline, Massachusetts, from the First Settlement of Muddy River Until the Present Time: 1630-1906; Commemorating the Two Hundredth Anniversary of the Town, Based on the Early Records and Other Authorities and Arranged by Leading Subjects. Containing Portraits and Sketches of the Town's Prominent Men Past and Present; Also Illustrations of Public Buildings and Residences. Brookline Press.
- Drake, Francis Samuel, ed. (1884). Tea Leaves: Being a Collection of Letters and Documents. A. O. Crane.
- Hurd, Duane Hamilton, ed. (1890). History of Middlesex County, Massachusetts: With Biographical Sketches of Many of Its Pioneers and Prominent Men. Vol. 3. J. W. Lewis & Company.
