= Boston Tea Party =

1773 American protest against British taxation

- Part of the American Revolution
- Boston Tea Party, an engraving in The History of North America, a 1799 book by William Cooper
- Date: December 16, 1773; 252 years ago
- Location: Boston, Province of Massachusetts Bay, British America; 42.3536°N 71.0524°W
- Caused by: Tea Act
- Goals: To protest British Parliament's tax on tea. "No taxation without representation."
- Methods: Throwing the tea into Boston Harbor
- Result: Intolerable Acts

Parties
Sons of Liberty	Great Britain; East India Company; Parliament

Lead figures
Samuel Adams; William Molineux; and other "Sons of Liberty"...	Thomas Hutchinson

The Boston Tea Party was an act of protest that took place on December 16, 1773, during the American Revolution. Initiated by the Sons of Liberty in Boston, the capital of Massachusetts, one of the Thirteen Colonies of British America, it escalated tensions between Great Britain and the Patriots, who opposed British policy towards its American colonies. Less than two years later, on April 19, 1775, the Battles of Lexington and Concord, also in Massachusetts, launched the eight-year American Revolutionary War, which resulted in the independence of the colonies as the United States.

The source of the protestors' anger was the passage of the Tea Act by the Parliament of Great Britain on May 10, 1773, which allowed the East India Company (EIC) to sell Chinese tea in the colonies without paying taxes apart from those imposed by the Townshend Acts. The Sons of Liberty strongly opposed both the Tea Act and Townshend Acts, which they saw as a violation of their "rights as Englishmen" to no taxation without representation.

Disguised as American Indians, members of the Sons of Liberty boarded the merchantman Dartmouth on the night of December 16 after it had docked in Boston with a major shipment of EIC tea and threw 340 or 342 chests (Note: Depending on the source; see § Number of chests) into Boston Harbor. The British government considered the protest an act of treason and responded with several punitive measures. Nine days later, on December 25, during the Philadelphia Tea Party, a group of Patriots forced the merchantmen Polly, which was transporting a shipment of tea, to return to England without unloading her cargo.

Parliament responded in 1774 with the Intolerable Acts, which, among other provisions, ended local self-government in Massachusetts and closed Boston's commercial port. Colonists throughout the Thirteen Colonies responded to the Intolerable Acts with additional acts of protest, and by convening the First Continental Congress in Philadelphia, which sent a Petition to the King for repeal of the acts and coordinated colonial resistance to them, culminating in the October 1774 Continental Association.

== History ==
The event was initially known as "The Destruction of the Tea". The moniker "Boston Tea Party" gained popularity in the early 19th century as the event took on a legendary status in American history. The ironic name succinctly captures the combination of locality (Boston), the commodity involved (tea), and the nature of the event (a political "party" or gathering, in this case as a form of protest). The Boston Tea Party arose from two challenges confronting the British Empire, the financial problems of the British East India Company and an ongoing dispute about the extent of Parliament's authority, if any, over the British American colonies without seating any elected representation. The North Ministry's attempt to resolve these issues produced a showdown, which was a source of dispute throughout the American Revolution, leading ultimately to the associated Revolutionary War and ultimately the end of British authority in the Thirteen Colonies and the emergence of the United States as a sovereign nation. The Boston Tea Party was the second American tax revolt against the British royal authority. The first, which occurred in April 1772, in Weare, New Hampshire, was the Pine Tree Riot, in which colonists protested heavy fines levied against them for harvesting trees.

=== Tea trade to 1767 ===
As Europeans developed a taste for tea in the 17th century, rival trading companies were formed to import it from China. In 1698, the English Parliament granted the East India Company a monopoly on the importation of tea. When tea became popular in the British colonies, Parliament sought to eliminate foreign competition by passing an act in 1721 that required colonists to import their tea only from Great Britain. The East India Company did not export tea to the colonies; by law, the company was required to sell its tea wholesale at auctions in England. British firms bought this tea and exported it to the colonies, where they resold it to merchants in Boston, New York, Philadelphia, and Charleston.

Until 1767, the East India Company paid an ad valorem tax of about 25% on tea that it imported into Great Britain. Parliament laid additional taxes on tea sold for consumption in Britain. These high taxes, combined with the fact that tea imported into the Dutch Republic was not taxed by the Dutch government, meant that Britons and British Americans could buy smuggled Dutch tea at much cheaper prices. The biggest market for illicit tea was England. By the 1760s, the East India Company was losing £400,000 per year to smugglers in Great Britain, whilst in North America Dutch merchants were regularly smuggling tea and other East India goods into Virginia, Philadelphia and New York without paying six pence tea duty import tax.

To help the East India Company compete with smuggled Dutch tea, Parliament passed the Indemnity Act in 1767, which lowered the tax on tea consumed in Great Britain and gave the East India Company a refund of the 25% duty on tea that was re-exported to the colonies. (Note: This kind of refund or rebate is known as a "drawback") To help offset this loss of government revenue, Parliament also passed the Townshend Revenue Act of 1767, which levied new taxes, including one on tea, in the colonies.

=== Townshend Acts ===
A controversy between Great Britain and the colonies arose in the 1760s when Parliament sought, for the first time, to impose a direct tax on the colonies for the purpose of raising revenue. Some colonists, known in the colonies as American patriots, objected to the new tax program, arguing that it was a violation of the British Constitution. Britons and British Americans agreed that, according to the constitution, British subjects could not be taxed without the consent of their elected representatives. In Great Britain, this meant that taxes could only be levied by Parliament. Colonists, however, did not elect members of Parliament, and so American Whigs argued that the colonies could not be taxed by that body. According to the Whigs, colonists could only be taxed by their own colonial assemblies. Colonial protests resulted in the repeal of the Stamp Act in 1766, but in the 1766 Declaratory Act, Parliament continued to insist that it had the right to legislate for the colonies "in all cases whatsoever".

When new taxes were levied in the Townshend Revenue Act of 1767, American patriots again responded with protests and boycotts. Merchants organized a non-importation agreement, and many colonists pledged to abstain from drinking British tea, with activists in New England promoting alternatives, such as domestic Labrador tea. Smuggling continued apace, especially in New York and Philadelphia, where tea smuggling had always been more extensive than in Boston. Dutied British tea continued to be imported into Boston, however, especially by Richard Clarke and the sons of Massachusetts Governor Thomas Hutchinson, until pressure from Massachusetts Whigs compelled them to abide by the non-importation agreement.

Parliament finally responded to the protests by repealing the Townshend taxes in 1770, except for the tea duty, which Prime Minister Lord North kept to assert "the right of taxing the Americans". This partial repeal of the taxes was enough to bring an end to the non-importation movement by October 1770. From 1771 to 1773, British tea was once again imported into the colonies in significant amounts, with merchants paying the Townshend duty of three pence (equivalent to £1.32 in 2025) per pound in weight of tea. Boston was the largest colonial importer of legal tea; smugglers still dominated the market in New York and Philadelphia.

In the 1772 Gaspee affair, colonists attacked and burned a British Navy ship, which was then engaged in enforcing British customs laws off the coast of Newport, Rhode Island.

== Tea Act of 1773 ==
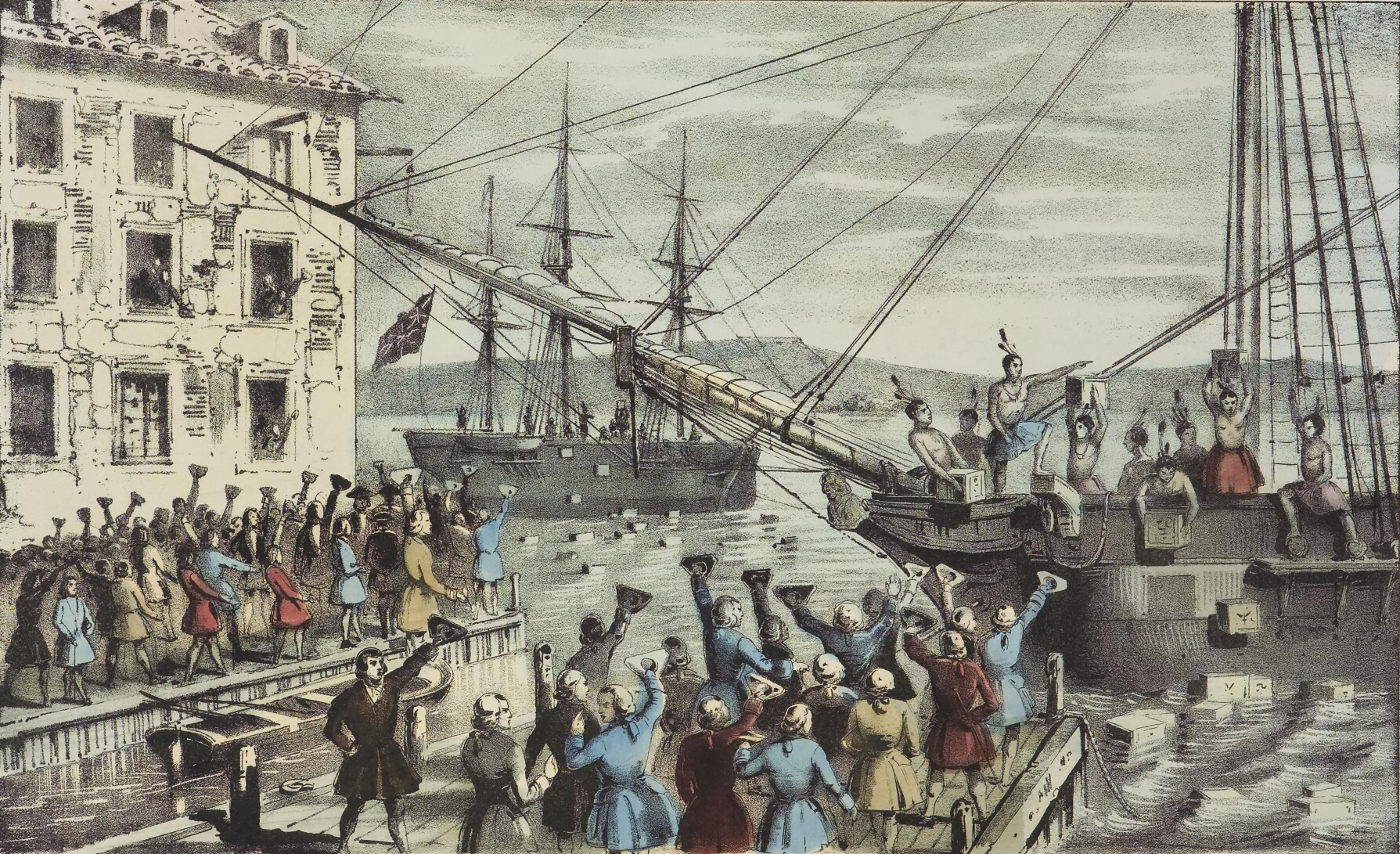
The Destruction of Tea at Boston Harbor, an iconic 1846 lithograph by Nathaniel Currier; the phrase "Boston Tea Party" had not yet become standard. Contrary to Currier's depiction, few of the men dumping the tea were actually disguised as American Indians.

The Indemnity Act of 1767, which gave the East India Company a refund of the duty on tea that was re-exported to the colonies, expired in 1772. Parliament passed a new act in 1772 that reduced this refund, effectively leaving a 10% duty on re-exported tea. (Note: The 1772 tax act was 12 Geo. 3. c. 60 sec. 1) The act also restored the tea taxes within Britain that had been repealed in 1767, and left in place the three pence Townshend duty in the colonies, equal to £1.32 today. With this new tax burden driving up the price of British tea, sales plummeted. The company continued to import tea into Great Britain; however, it amassed a huge surplus of product that no one would buy. For these and other reasons, by late 1772, the East India Company, one of Britain's most important commercial institutions, was in a serious financial crisis. The severe famine in Bengal from 1769 to 1773 had drastically reduced the revenue of the East India Company from India, bringing the Company to the verge of bankruptcy. The Tea Act of 1773 was enacted to help the East India Company.

Eliminating some of the taxes was one obvious solution to the crisis. The East India Company initially sought to have the Townshend duties repealed, but the North ministry was unwilling because such an action might be interpreted as a retreat from Parliament's position that it had the right to tax the colonies. More importantly, the tax collected from the Townshend duties was used to pay the salaries of some colonial governors and judges. This was in fact the purpose of the Townshend tax: previously, these officials had been paid by the colonial assemblies, but Parliament now paid their salaries to keep them dependent on the British government rather than allowing them to be accountable to the colonists.

Another possible solution for reducing the growing mound of tea in the East India Company warehouses was to sell it cheaply in Europe. This possibility was investigated, but it was determined that the tea would simply be smuggled back into Great Britain, where it would undersell the taxed product. The best market for the East India Company's surplus tea, so it seemed, was the American colonies, if a way could be found to make it cheaper than the smuggled Dutch tea.

The North Ministry's solution was the Tea Act, which received the assent of King George on May 10, 1773. This act restored the East India Company's full refund on the duty for importing tea into Britain, and also permitted the company, for the first time, to export tea to the colonies on its own account. This would allow the company to reduce costs by eliminating the middlemen who bought the tea at wholesale auctions in London. Instead of selling to middlemen, the company now appointed colonial merchants to receive the tea on consignment; the consignees would in turn sell the tea for a commission. In July 1773, tea consignees were selected in New York, Philadelphia, Boston, and Charleston. The Tea Act in 1773 authorized the shipment of 5,000 chests of tea (250 tons) to the American colonies. There would be a tax of £1,750 (equal to £231,000 today) to be paid by the importers when the cargo landed. The act granted the East India Company a monopoly on the sale of tea that was cheaper than smuggled tea; its hidden purpose was to force the colonists to pay a tax of 3 pennies on every pound of tea.

The Tea Act thus retained the three pence Townshend duty on tea imported to the colonies. Some members of Parliament wanted to eliminate this tax, arguing that there was no reason to provoke another colonial controversy. Former Chancellor of the Exchequer William Dowdeswell, for example, warned Lord North that the Americans would not accept the tea if the Townshend duty remained. But North did not want to give up the revenue from the Townshend tax, primarily because it was used to pay the salaries of colonial officials; maintaining the right of to tax the Americans was a secondary concern. According to historian Benjamin Labaree, "A stubborn Lord North had unwittingly hammered a nail in the coffin of the old British Empire."

Even with the Townshend duty in effect, the Tea Act would allow the East India Company to sell tea more cheaply than before, undercutting the prices offered by smugglers, but also undercutting colonial tea importers, who paid the tax and received no refund. In 1772, legally imported Bohea, the most common variety of tea, sold for about 3 shillings (3s) per pound, equal to £19.82 today. After the Tea Act, colonial consignees would be able to sell tea for 2 shillings per pound (2s), just under the smugglers' price of 2 shillings and 1 penny (2s 1d). Realizing that the payment of the Townshend duty was politically sensitive, the company hoped to conceal the tax by making arrangements to have it paid either in London once the tea was landed in the colonies or have the consignees quietly pay the duties after the tea was sold. This effort to hide the tax from the colonists was unsuccessful.

== Resisting the Tea Act ==
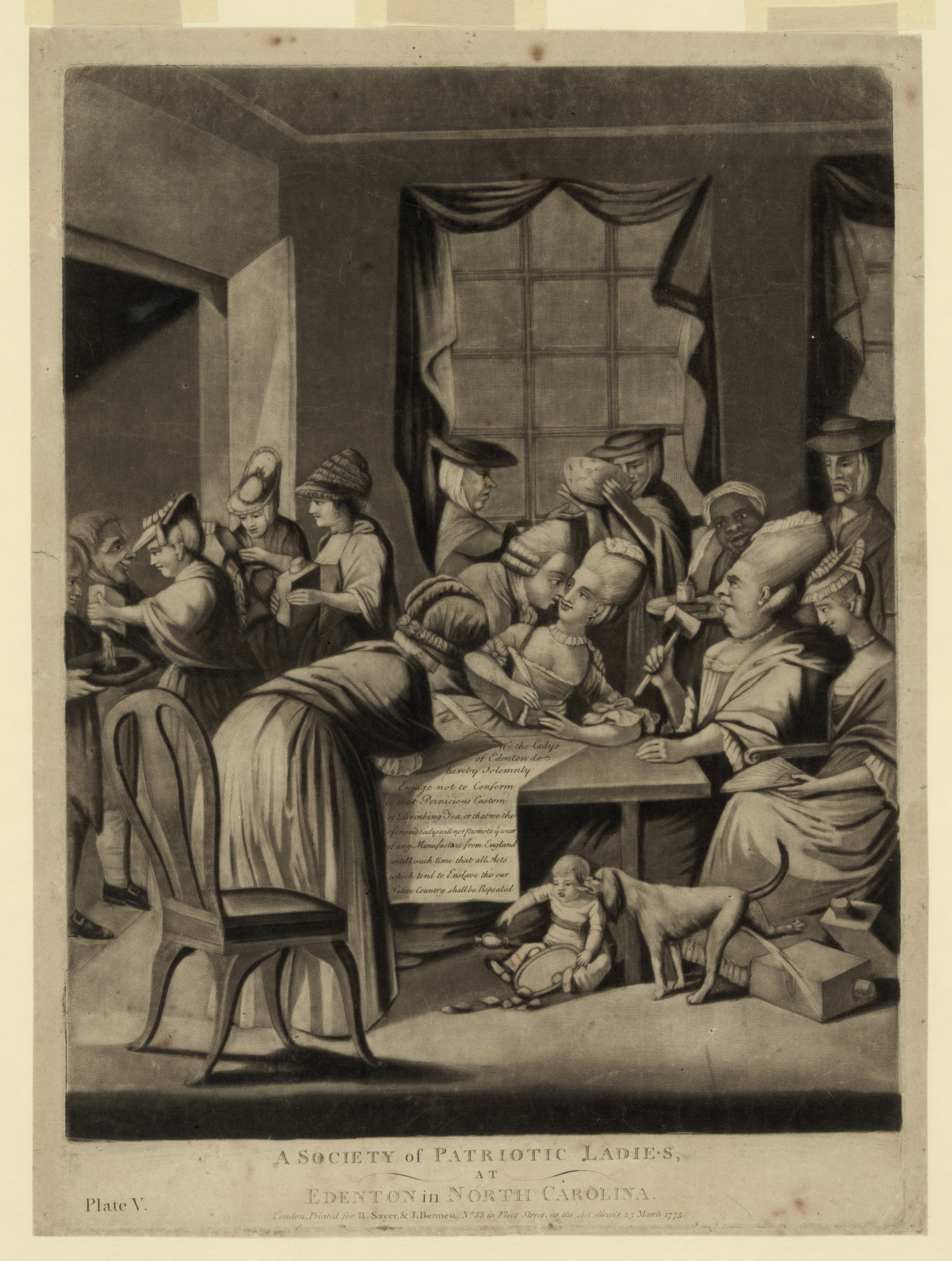
A 1775 British cartoon, A Society of Patriotic Ladies at Edenton in North Carolina, satirizing the Edenton Tea Party, a group of American women who organized a boycott of British tea

In September and October 1773, seven ships carrying East India Company tea were sent to the colonies: four were bound for Boston, and one each for New York, Philadelphia, and Charleston, South Carolina. The ships contained over 2,000 chests, representing nearly 600,000 pounds (270,000 kg) of tea. Americans learned the details of the Tea Act while the ships were en route, and opposition began to mount. Whigs, sometimes calling themselves Sons of Liberty, began a campaign to raise awareness and to convince or compel the consignees to resign, in the same way that stamp distributors had been forced to resign in the 1765 Stamp Act crisis.

The protest movement that culminated with the Boston Tea Party was not a dispute about high taxes. The price of legally imported tea was actually reduced by the Tea Act of 1773. Protesters were instead concerned with a variety of other issues. The familiar "no taxation without representation" argument, along with the question of the extent of Parliament's authority in the colonies, remained prominent. Samuel Adams considered the British tea monopoly to be "equal to a tax" and to raise the same representation issue whether or not a tax was applied to it. Some regarded the purpose of the tax program, which made leading officials independent of colonial influence, as a dangerous infringement of colonial rights. This was especially true in Massachusetts, the only colony where the Townshend program had been fully implemented.

Colonial merchants, some of them smugglers, played a significant role in the protests. Because the Tea Act made legally imported tea cheaper, it threatened to put smugglers of Dutch tea out of business. Legitimate tea importers who had not been named as consignees by the East India Company were also threatened with financial ruin by the Tea Act. Another major concern for merchants was that the Tea Act gave the East India Company a monopoly on the tea trade, and it was feared that this government-created monopoly might be extended in the future to include other goods.

In New York, Philadelphia, and Charleston, protesters compelled the tea consignees to resign. In Charleston, the consignees had been forced to resign by early December, and the unclaimed tea was seized by customs officials. There were mass protest meetings in Philadelphia, during which Benjamin Rush, who later served as a Second Continental Congress delegate from the Province of Pennsylvania, urged his fellow countrymen to oppose the landing of the tea because the cargo contained "the seeds of slavery". By early December, the Philadelphia consignees resigned, and in late December the tea ship returned to England with its cargo following a confrontation with the ship's captain. The tea ship bound for New York City was delayed by bad weather; by the time it arrived, the consignees had resigned, and the ship returned to England with the tea.

=== Standoff in Boston ===
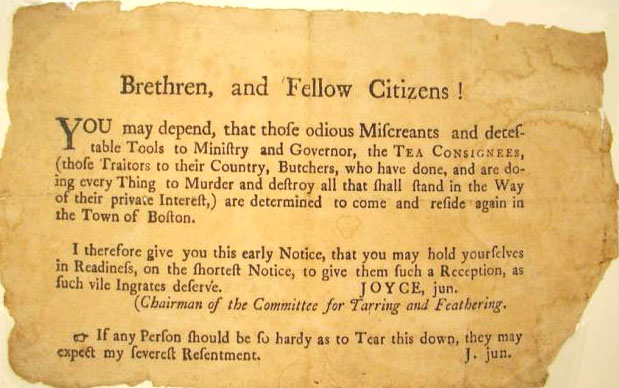
A notice from the "Chairman of the Committee for Tarring and Feathering" in Boston, denouncing the tea consignees as "traitors to their country"

In every colony except Massachusetts, protesters were able to force the tea consignees to resign or to return the tea to England. In Boston, however, Governor Hutchinson was determined to hold his ground. He convinced the tea consignees, two of whom were his sons, not to back down.

When the tea ship Dartmouth (Note: Dartmouth had delivered whale oil to London and taken on the tea as return cargo) arrived in the Boston Harbor in late November, Whig leader Samuel Adams called for a mass meeting to be held at Faneuil Hall on November 29, 1773. Thousands of people arrived, so many that the meeting was moved to the larger Old South Meeting House. (Note: This was not an official town meeting, but a gathering of "the body of the people" of greater Boston) British law required Dartmouth to unload and pay the duties within twenty days or customs officials could confiscate the cargo (i.e. unload it onto American soil). The mass meeting passed a resolution, introduced by Adams and based on a similar set of resolutions promulgated earlier in Philadelphia, urging the captain of Dartmouth to send the ship back without paying the import duty. Meanwhile, the meeting assigned twenty-five men to watch the ship and prevent the tea – including a number of chests from Davison, Newman and Co. of London – from being unloaded.

Governor Hutchinson, governor of colonial Massachusetts Bay Colony, refused to grant permission for the Dartmouth to leave without paying the duty. Two more tea ships, Eleanor and Beaver, arrived in Boston Harbor. On December 16, the last day of Dartmouth's deadline, approximately 5,000 to 7,000 people out of an estimated population of 16,000 gathered around Old South Meeting House. After receiving a report that Governor Hutchinson had again refused to let the ships leave, Adams announced, "This meeting can do nothing further to save the country."

According to a popular story, Adams's statement was a prearranged signal for the tea party to begin. This claim, however, did not appear in print until publication of Adams' great-grandson was published nearly a century after the event, who apparently misinterpreted the evidence. According to eyewitness accounts, people did not leave the meeting until ten to fifteen minutes after Adams's alleged "signal", and Adams in fact tried to stop people from leaving because the meeting was not yet over. (Note: For firsthand accounts that contradict the story that Adams gave the signal for the tea party, see: Upton, L. F. S. (1965). "Proceeding of Ye Body Respecting the Tea". William and Mary Quarterly. Third. 22 (2): 297–298. doi:10.2307/1920700.; Drake, Francis S. Drake (1884). Tea Leaves: Being a Collection of Letters and Documents. Boston: A. O. Crane. p. LXX.; Boston Evening-Post, December 20, 1773; The Boston-Gazette, and Country Journal, December 20, 1773; The Massachusetts Gazette and the Boston Weekly News-Letter, December 23, 1773)

== Destruction of the tea ==
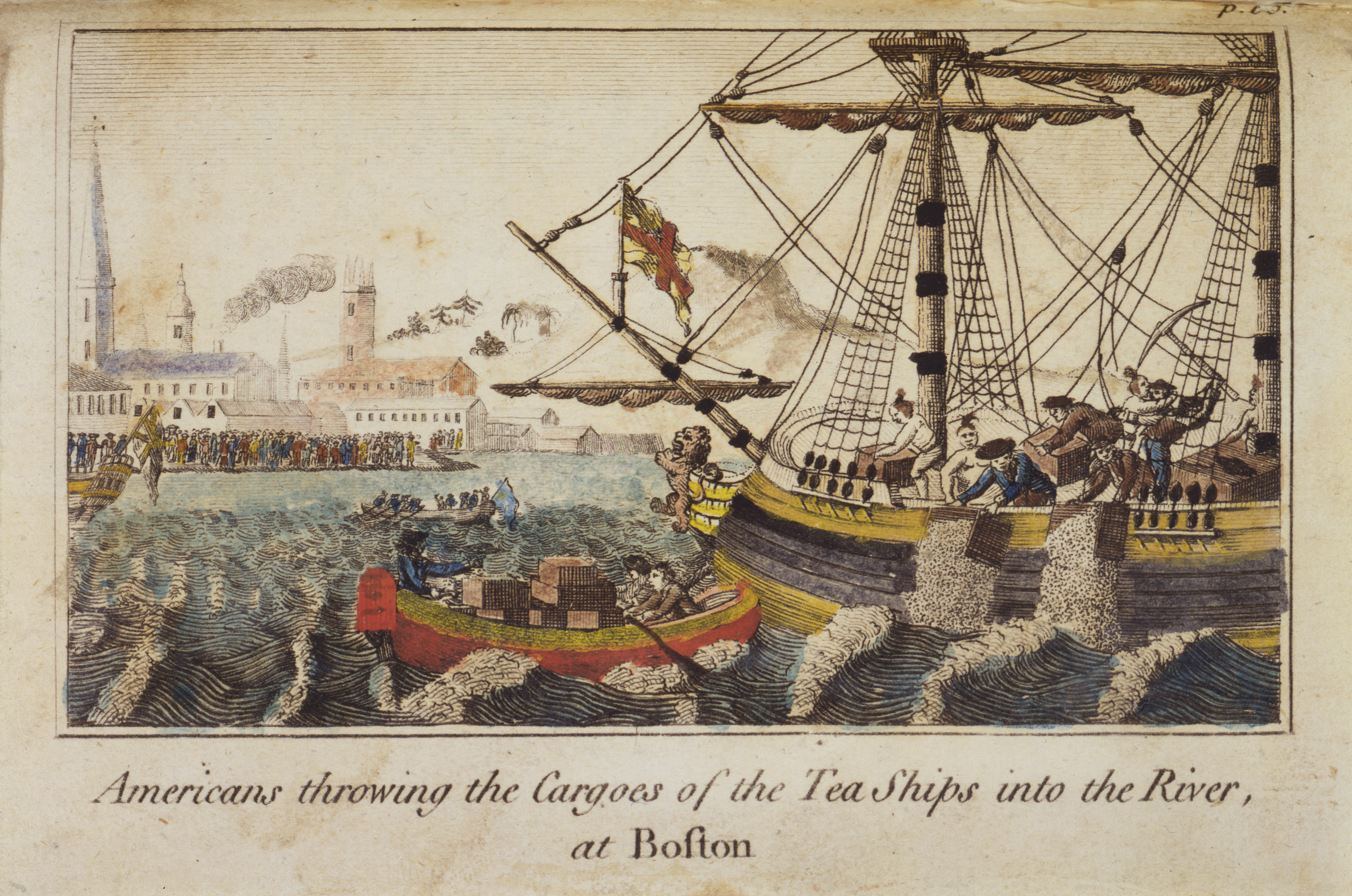
A 1789 engraving of the destruction of tea during the Boston Tea Party

While Samuel Adams tried to reassert control of the meeting, people poured out of the Old South Meeting House to prepare to take action. In some cases, this involved donning what may have been elaborately prepared Mohawk costumes. While disguising their individual faces was imperative, because of the illegality of their protest, dressing as Mohawk warriors was a specific and symbolic choice. It showed that the Sons of Liberty identified with America, over their official status as subjects of Great Britain.

That evening about 6 or 7 o'clock a large group of 30 to 130 men or more, armed with axes and some dressed in the Mohawk warrior disguises, went to the wharves where the tea ships were and boarded the three vessels. Over the course of three hours they dumped all 340 or 342 chests of tea into the water. The precise location of the Griffin's Wharf site of the Tea Party has been subject to prolonged uncertainty; a comprehensive study places it near the foot of Hutchinson Street (today's Pearl Street). The property damage amounted to the destruction of 92,616 pounds (42,010 kg) of tea, reported by the British East India Company to be worth £9,659, equivalent to £1,276,141 ($1,748,138) in 2025. See the § invoice to Parliament table below for a breakdown of the weight and cost.

Two of the three ships, the Beaver and Dartmouth, were owned by the Rotch family, a wealthy merchant dynasty of Quakers from Nantucket—depending on the source, specifically by either Joseph, the family patriarch, or one of his sons, William or Francis; (Note: One source states that the two brothers each owned a ship, rather than just one of them owning both: William the Beaver, and Francis the Dartmouth.) both ships were built by the Rotch family. The third ship, the Eleanor, was owned by John Rowe, an English-born Boston merchant and smuggler. The shipmasters were Captain Hezekiah Coffin of the Beaver, Captain James Hall of the Dartmouth, and Captain James Bruce of the Eleanor.

Another tea ship intended for Boston, the William, ran aground at Cape Cod in December 1773, and its tea was taxed and sold to private parties. In March 1774, the Sons of Liberty received information that this tea was being held in a warehouse in Boston, entered the warehouse and destroyed all they could find. Some of it had already been sold to Davison, Newman and Co. and was being held in their shop. On March 7, Sons of Liberty once again dressed as Mohawks, broke into the shop, and dumped the last remaining tea into the harbor.

=== Number of chests ===
Historical reports conflict on the number of chests that were thrown into the harbor. Many history textbooks and encyclopedias, as well as US government websites, state that there were 342 chests destroyed. One of the earliest accounts of this number comes from a 1773 issue of the Boston Gazette, published just days after the event. However, The National Archives of the UK, as well as some historical societies, state that there were only 340 chests destroyed. This is on account that the Dartmouth and Eleanor each carried 114 chests, while the Beaver only carried 112 chests. These numbers can be found in the East India Company's manifest in their 1774 petition to Parliament requesting reimbursement for the damages:

East India Company's invoice to Parliament (1774)
Ship	Tea	Chests	Weight (lb)	Cost				
Ship	Tea	Chests	Weight (lb)	Per lb		Total		
Ship	Tea	Chests	Weight (lb)	s	d	£	s	d
Beaver	Bohea	80	28,625	2	0	2,862	10	0
Beaver	Singlo (1^{st} sort)	20	1,637	2	8	218	5	4
Beaver	Hyson	5	380	5	0	95	0	0
Beaver	Congou	5	432	2	3	48	12	0
Beaver	Souchong	2	138	3	0	20	14	0
Beaver	—N/a	112	31,212	—N/a		3,245	1	4
Dartmouth	Bohea	80	28,161	2	0	2,816	2	0
Dartmouth	Singlo (1^{st} sort)	20	1,596	2	8	212	16	0
Dartmouth	Hyson	5	370	5	0	92	10	0
Dartmouth	Congou	5	428	2	3	48	3	0
Dartmouth	Souchong	4	276	3	0	41	8	0
Dartmouth	—N/a	114	30,831	—N/a		3,210	19	0
Eleanor	Bohea	80	28,094	2	0	2,809	8	0
Eleanor	Singlo (Hyson Skins)	20	1,389	3	0	208	7	0
Eleanor	Hyson	5	384	5	0	96	0	0
Eleanor	Congou	5	436	2	3	49	1	0
Eleanor	Souchong	4	270	3	0	40	10	0
Eleanor	—N/a	114	30,573	—N/a		3,203	6	0
Total	—N/a	340	92,616	—N/a		9,659	6	4

== Reaction ==
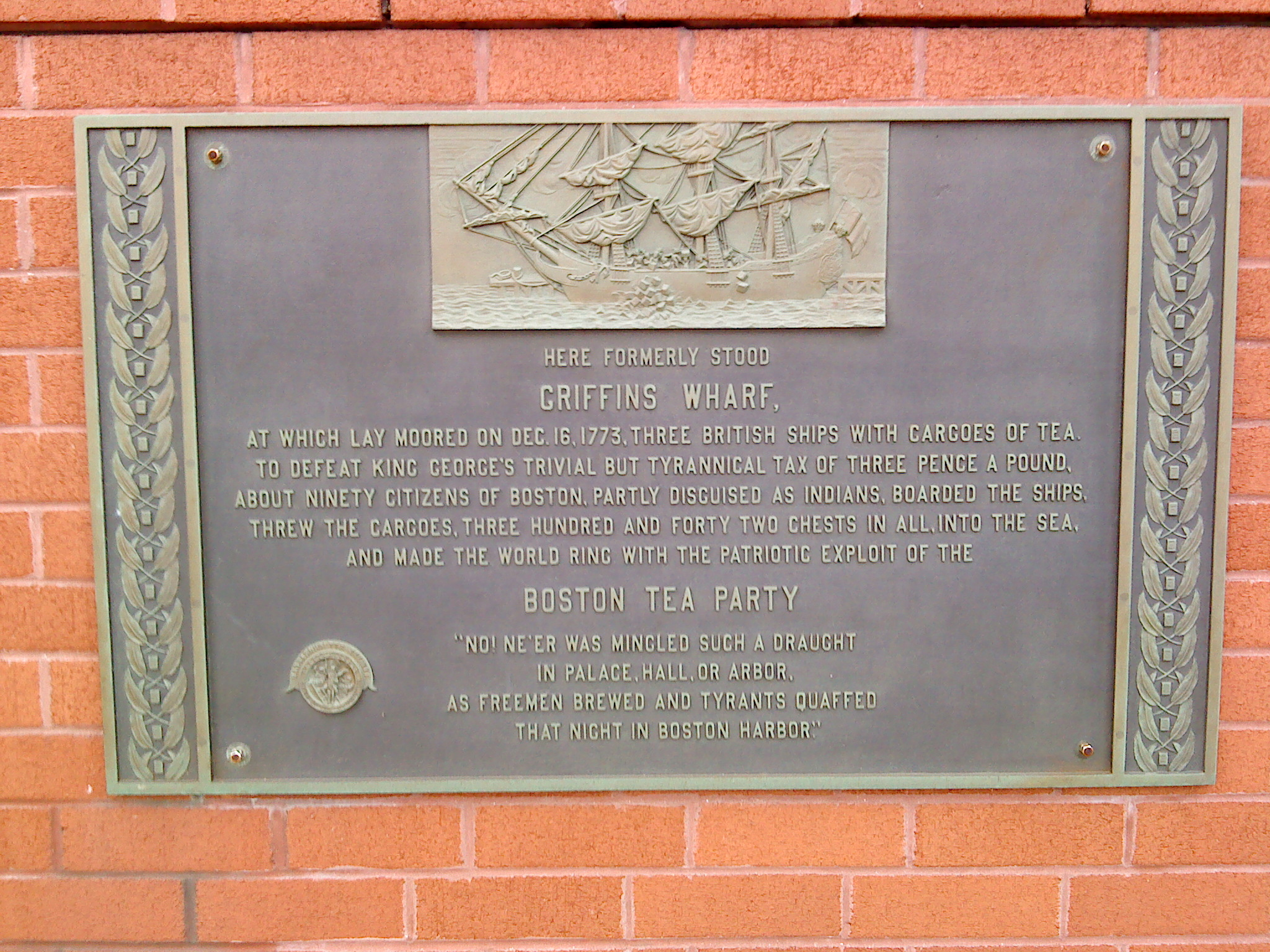
A plaque commemorating the Boston Tea Party, currently affixed to side of the Independence Wharf Building in Boston

Whether or not Samuel Adams helped plan the Boston Tea Party is disputed, but he immediately worked to publicize and defend it. He argued that the Tea Party was not the act of a lawless mob, but was instead a principled protest and the only remaining option the people had to defend their constitutional rights.

News of the Boston Tea Party quickly spread to other American colonies. On December 17th, Paul Revere carried news of the Tea Party to New York City, as an express rider. The Boston Gazette reported that Patriots in New York "highly extolled the Bostonians for what the Indians had done."

John Adams, Samuel's second cousin and also a Founding Father, wrote in his diary on December 17, 1773, that the Boston Tea Party proved a historical moment in the American Revolution, writing:

This is the most magnificent Movement of all. There is a Dignity, a Majesty, a Sublimity, in this last Effort of the Patriots, that I greatly admire. The People should never rise, without doing something to be remembered—something notable And striking. This Destruction of the Tea is so bold, so daring, so firm, intrepid and inflexible, and it must have so important Consequences, and so lasting, that I cant but consider it as an Epocha in History.

In Great Britain, even those politicians considered friends of the colonies were appalled and this act united all parties there against the colonies. The Prime Minister Lord North said, "Whatever may be the consequence, we must risk something; if we do not, all is over". The British government felt this action could not remain unpunished, and responded by closing the port of Boston and putting in place other laws known as the "Intolerable Acts". Although the first three, the Boston Port Act, the Massachusetts Government Act, and the Administration of Justice Act, applied only to Massachusetts, colonists outside that colony feared that their governments could now also be changed by legislative fiat in England. The Intolerable Acts were viewed as a violation of constitutional rights, natural rights, and colonial charters, and united many colonists throughout America. Benjamin Franklin stated that the East India Company should be paid for the destroyed tea, all ninety thousand pounds (which, at two shillings per pound, came to £9,000, or £1.19 million [2014, approx. $1.7 million US]). Robert Murray, a New York merchant, went to Lord North with three other merchants and offered to pay for the losses, but the offer was turned down.

A number of colonists were inspired by the Boston Tea Party to carry out similar acts, such as the burning of Peggy Stewart. The Boston Tea Party eventually proved to be one of the many reactions that led to the American Revolutionary War. In February 1775, Britain passed the Conciliatory Resolution, which ended taxation for any colony that satisfactorily provided for the imperial defense and the upkeep of imperial officers. The tax on tea was repealed with the Taxation of Colonies Act 1778, part of another Parliamentary attempt at conciliation that failed.

=== Edenton Tea Party ===
While delegates convened in the First Continental Congress, fifty-one women in Edenton, North Carolina formed their own association (now referred to as the Edenton Tea Party) in response to the Intolerable Acts that focused on producing goods for the colonies.

== Legacy ==
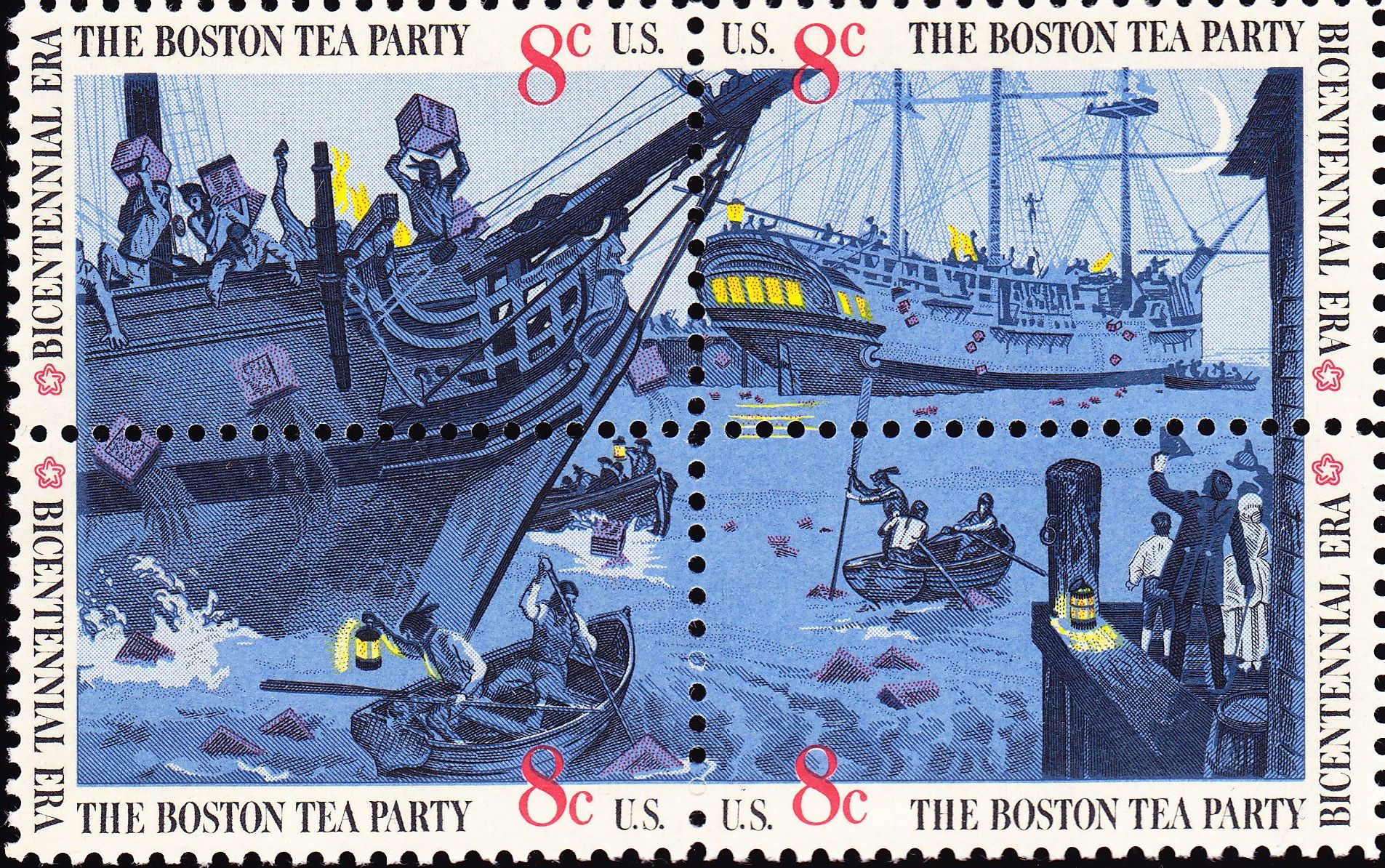
In 1973, the U.S. Postal Service issued a set of four stamps, which combined to form one scene of the Boston Tea Party.

External videos
- Booknotes interview with Alfred Young on The Shoemaker and the Tea Party, November 21, 1999, C-SPAN

John Adams and many other Americans considered tea drinking to be unpatriotic following the Boston Tea Party. Tea drinking declined during and after the Revolution, resulting in a shift to coffee as the preferred hot drink. In a July 1774 letter to his wife, Abigail, Adams renounced tea in favor of coffee:

I believe I forgot to tell you one Anecdote: When I first came to this House it was late in the Afternoon, and I had ridden 35 miles at least. "Madam" said I to Mrs. Huston, "is it lawfull for a weary Traveller to refresh himself with a Dish of Tea provided it has been honestly smuggled, or paid no Duties?"
"No sir, said she, we have renounced all Tea in this Place. I cant make Tea, but I'le make you Coffee." Accordingly I have drank Coffee every Afternoon since, and have borne it very well. Tea must be universally renounced. I must be weaned, and the sooner, the better.

According to historian Alfred Young, the term "Boston Tea Party" did not appear in print until 1834. Before that time, the event was usually referred to as the "destruction of the tea". According to Young, American writers were for many years apparently reluctant to celebrate the destruction of property, and so the event was usually ignored in histories of the American Revolution. This began to change in the 1830s, however, especially with the publication of biographies of George Robert Twelves Hewes, one of the few still-living participants of the "tea party", as it then became known.

The Boston Tea Party has often been referenced in other political protests. When Mohandas Gandhi led a mass burning of Indian registration cards in South Africa in 1908, a British newspaper compared the event to the Boston Tea Party. When Gandhi met with the Viceroy of India in 1930 after the Indian salt protest campaign, Gandhi took some duty-free salt from his shawl and said, with a smile, that the salt was "to remind us of the famous Boston Tea Party".

American activists from a variety of political viewpoints have invoked the Tea Party as a symbol of protest. In 1973, on the 200th anniversary of the Tea Party, a mass meeting at Faneuil Hall called for the impeachment of President Richard Nixon and protested oil companies in the ongoing oil crisis. Protesters later boarded a replica ship in Boston Harbor, hanged Nixon in effigy, and dumped several empty oil drums into the harbor. In 1998, two conservative US Congressmen put the federal tax code into a chest marked "tea" and dumped it into the harbor.

In 2006, a libertarian political party called the "Boston Tea Party" was founded. In 2007, the Ron Paul "Tea Party" money bomb, held on the 234th anniversary of the Boston Tea Party, broke the one-day fund-raising record by raising $6.04 million in 24 hours. The Tea Party movement, which dominated conservative American politics for the next two years, reaching its peak with a voter victory for the Republicans in 2010, who were widely elected to seats in the United States House of Representatives.

In 2023, the December 16th 1773 organization hosted a 250th anniversary re-enactment of the Tea Party, putting an original bottle of tea on display.

=== Boston Tea Party Ships and Museum ===
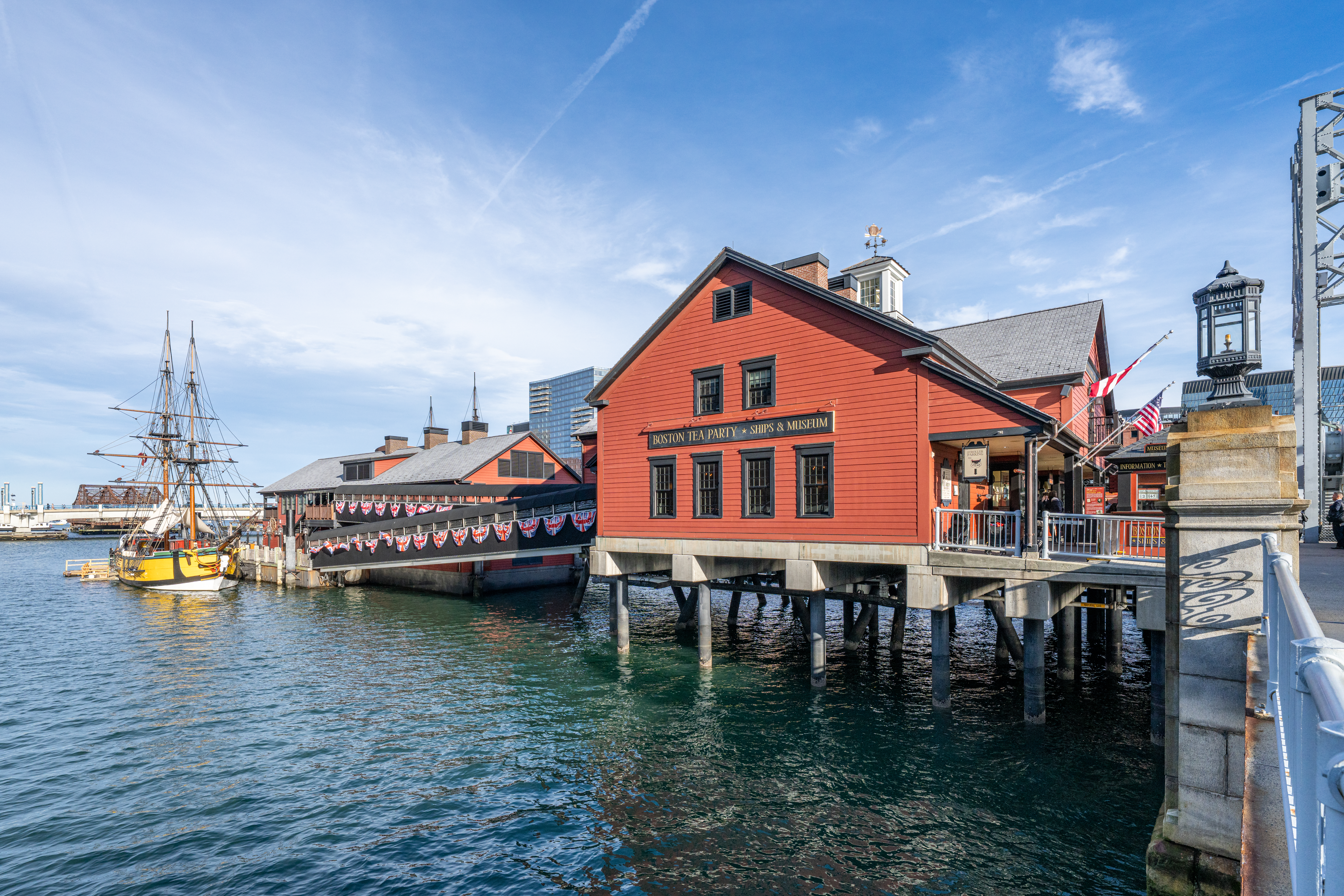
Boston Tea Party Ships & Museum (2025)

The Boston Tea Party Museum is located on the Congress Street Bridge in Boston. It features reenactments, a documentary, and a number of interactive exhibits. The museum features two replica ships of the period, Eleanor and Beaver. Additionally, the museum possesses one of two known tea chests from the original event, part of its permanent collection.

=== Participants ===
- Phineas Stearns
- George Robert Twelves Hewes
- David Kinnison

=== Actual tea ===
The American Antiquarian Society holds in its collection a vial of actual tea-infused harbor water from 1773.

== Cultural references ==
The Boston Tea Party has been the subject of several films:

- The Boston Tea Party, a 1908 film by Edwin S. Porter
- The Boston Tea Party, a 1915 film by Eugene Nowland
- The Boston Tea Party, a 1934 film narrated by John B. Kennedy
- Boston Tea Party, a 1957 educational Disney film excerpted from Johnny Tremain (1957)

It has been subject of The Boston Tea Party, a 1976 play by Allan Albert, and "Boston Tea Party", a 1976 song by the Sensational Alex Harvey Band from SAHB Stories.

== Bibliography ==
- Alexander, John K. (2002). Samuel Adams: America's Revolutionary Politician. Bloomsbury Publishing PLC. ISBN 978-1-4616-4278-7.
- Ammerman, David (1974). In the Common Cause: American Response to the Coercive Acts of 1774. New York: Norton.
- Brodsky, Alyn (2004). Benjamin Rush: Patriot and Physician. Truman Talley Books. ISBN 978-0-312-30911-4.
- Carp, Benjamin L. (2010). "1: The Empire's Corporation". Defiance of the Patriots: The Boston Tea Party and the Making of America. New Haven: Yale University Press. ISBN 978-0-300-11705-9.
- Cobbett, William (1813). The Parliamentary History of England, from the Earliest Period to the Year 1803. Vol. 17.
- Denehy, John William (1906). A History of Brookline, Massachusetts, from the First Settlement of Muddy River Until the Present Time: 1630-1906. Brookline Press.
- Erikson, Erik H. (1969). Gandhi's Truth: On the Origins of Militant Nonviolence. New York: Norton.
- Gross, David M. (2014). 99 Tactics of Successful Tax Resistance Campaigns. Picket Line Press. ISBN 978-1-4905-7274-1.
- Ketchum, Richard M. (2003). Divided Loyalties: How the American Revolution Came to New York. Macmillan. ISBN 978-0-8050-6120-8.
- Hitchman, Lydia S. (February 1907). "William Rotch and the Neutrality of Nantucket during the Revolutionary War". Bulletin of Friends' Historical Society of Philadelphia. 1 (2) – via Google Books.
- Knollenberg, Bernhard (1975). Growth of the American Revolution, 1766-1775. Liberty Fund. ISBN 978-0-86597-415-9.
- Labaree, Benjamin Woods (1979) [1964]. The Boston Tea Party. Oxford University Press.
- Larkin, Colin, ed. (1997). The Virgin Encyclopedia of Popular Music (Concise ed.). Virgin Books. ISBN 1-85227-745-9.
- Maier, Pauline (1980). The Old Revolutionaries. Knopf Doubleday Publishing Group. ISBN 978-0-307-82811-8.
- Moss, Marissa (2016). America's Tea Parties: Not One but Four! Boston, Charleston, New York, Philadelphia. Abrams Books for Young Readers. ISBN 978-1-61312-915-9.
- Oberg, Barbara, ed. (2019). Women in the American Revolution: gender, politics, and the domestic world. Charlottesville: University of Virginia Press. ISBN 978-0-8139-4260-5. OCLC 1091235010.
- Poindexter, Leon (Winter 2012). "Ships of the Boston Tea Party: Eleanor, Beaver, and Dartmouth". Historic Nantucket. Vol. 62, no. 1. Nantucket, MA: Nantucket Historical Association. Archived from the original on February 27, 2023.
- Raphael, Ray (2001). A people's history of the American Revolution: How common people shaped the fight for independence. The New Press. ISBN 1-56584-653-2.
- Raphael, Ray (2004). Founding Myths: Stories That Hide Our Patriotic Past. The New Press. ISBN 978-1-59558-974-3.
- Rush, Benjamin (1951) [1773-10-20]. "To His Fellow Countrymen, On Patriotism". In Butterfield, Lyman Henry (ed.). Letters of Benjamin Rush: Volume I: 1761-1792.
- Sosin, Jack M. (June 12, 2022). "The Massachusetts Acts of 1774: Coercive or Preventive". Huntington Library Quarterly. 26 (3): 235–252. doi:10.2307/3816653. JSTOR 3816653.
- Thomas, Peter David Garner (1987). The Townshend Duties Crisis: The Second Phase of the American Revolution, 1767-1773. Clarendon Press. ISBN 978-0-19-822967-4.
- Tyler, John W. (2019) [1986]. Smugglers & Patriots: Boston Merchants and the Advent of the American Revolution. Boston: Northeastern University Press.
- Volo, James M. (2012). The Boston Tea Party: The Foundations of Revolution. ABC-CLIO. p. 29. ISBN 978-0-313-39875-9.
- Young, Alfred F. (1999). The Shoemaker and the Tea Party. New York: Beacon Press. ISBN 978-0-8070-5405-5.

== See also ==
- Prelude to the American Revolution
- Talbot Resolves, 1774 reaction in Maryland's Eastern Shore
- New York Tea Party
