= John Wingate Thornton =

American lawyer and book collector (1818–1878)

- John Wingate Thornton, 1870
- Born: August 12, 1818; Saco, Maine, United States
- Died: June 6, 1878 (aged 59); Scarborough, Maine, United States
- Occupation: Attorney
- Writing career
- Genre: History

John Wingate Thornton (August 12, 1818 – June 6, 1878) was an American lawyer, antiquarian, book collector and writer.

== Biography ==
=== Early life ===
He was born August 12, 1818, at the home of his grandfather, Thomas Gilbert Thornton in Saco, Maine. He attended school at Thornton Academy in Saco, Maine.

== Career ==
While studying to become a lawyer, he worked for his uncle, John Fairfield and graduated from Harvard in 1840 with an LL.B. He was awarded an honorary degree of A.M. from Bowdoin College in 1860. He practiced law in Boston, Massachusetts. John Wingate Thornton researched and wrote numerous family genealogies and authored a number of books. In 1844 he was a founding member of the New England Historic Genealogical Society and authored numerous articles for their publication, the Register. He was a member and vice-president of the American Statistical Association, and a member and vice-president of the Prince Society. He was elected a member of the American Antiquarian Society in 1855.

His 1844 report to the American Statistical Association was presented to Congress by John Quincy Adams who notes that it demonstrates "a multitude of gross and important errors in the printed census of 1840."

In August 1607, a company of Englishmen were landed near the mouth of the Kennebec River in Maine with the intent of starting a colony known as the Popham Colony. However, half of the colony returned in December 1607 and the remaining members returned to England the following year. John Wingate Thornton was invited to deliver a speech on August 29, 1862, during an occasion set to commemorate the failed Popham Colony. Much to the chagrin of the audience and Fort Popham Celebration committee members, John Wingate Thornton correctly pointed out, in contradiction to the beliefs of those who invited him, that the Popham Colony was not the first attempt at New England colonization, and that additionally it was not a serious attempt at creating a permanent colony as only men and not entire families were sent. His unpopular speech was left out of the printed proceedings of the commemoration and John Wingate Thornton resorted to privately printing the text of his speech in 1863.

He died on June 6, 1878, at the Oak Hill family estate in Scarborough, Maine, and is buried in the Laurel Hill Cemetery in Saco, Maine. A short biography of his life was written by Thomas Coffin Amory.

== Marriage and family ==
On May 31, 1848, he was married to Elizabeth Wallace Bowles by the Reverend Augustus C. Thompson in Roxbury, Massachusetts. They had four children, only one of whom (Elizabeth Thorndike Thornton) survived to adulthood.

== Timeline ==
Date	Age	Comment
August 12, 1818	0	Born at the house of his paternal grandfather, Thomas Gilbert Thornton, in Saco, Maine.
October 3, 1818	0	Baptized by Rev. Jonathan Cogswell at Saco, Maine.
March, 1826	7	JWT's father enrolls him at Thornton Academy in Saco, Maine. See List of Students 1813 - 1848 Thornton Academy, Saco, Maine; Burnham, Edward P. and George A. Emery, eds.; York Institute, Saco, ME; 1918.
1839 - 1840 [?]	20/21	Works for his uncle, John Fairfield, Governor of Maine and later U.S. Senator.
1840 [?]	21/22	Graduates Harvard Law School with LL.B.
1840	22	Moves to Boston and is admitted as a member of the Suffolk Bar. Original office was on State Street.
March 28, 1842	23	Writes a letter to his uncle, John Wingate Gookin, regarding Gookin family information to aid James Savage, historian and president of the Massachusetts Historical Society, in researching Maj. General Danial Gookin while on an upcoming trip to England. Letter also mentions the information on the New Hampshire chapter of the Society of the Cincinnati, which is in the possession of JWG. ("The Daily Kennebec Journal"; 24 Apr 1912).
September 17, 1842	24	Writes a letter to his uncle, Moses Emery, Counsellor at Law, Saco, Maine concerning numerous legal matters. Letter is postmarked from Boston, Massachusetts.
October 24, 1842	24	Presents to the New Hampshire Historical Society (on behalf of his uncle, John Wingate Gookin) the book and papers of the New Hampshire branch of the Society of the Cincinnati. The book is in the collections of the American Independence Museum. The contents of this book are published in The Institution and Records of the New Hampshire Society of the Cincinnati; Concord, NH; Ira C. Evans, Printer; 1893. This latter publication also contains a transcription of a letter from JWG presenting these materials to the NHHS. The letter reads: North Yarmouth Centre, State of Maine October 24, 1842 Rev. Nathaniel Bouton, Cor. Sec'y N.H.H.Society Dear Sir: I wish to present to the New Hampshire Historical Society (Through the hands of my Nephew, J. Wingate Thornton, Esq.) the book and papers of the New Hampshire branch of the Society of the Cincinnati, which has become extinct by the death of all the members; my Father, Daniel Gookin, was the last of the original members, & he has been dead about 12 years. I consider the Library of your Society the most safe & proper place for the deposit of this valuable record of some of our Revolutionary worthies; & although they have gone to their home, I hope the principles for which they contended may be perpetuated to the latest posterity. I am, Sir, Very Respectfully, your ob't Serv't John W. Gookin
1844	25/26	Memorial Of The American Statistical Association Praying The Adoption Of Measures For The Correction Of Errors In The Census; Jarvis, Edward. William Brigham And J. Wingate Thornton, for the American Statistical Association, 18 pp, is published.
April 30, 1844	25	Writes a letter, assumed addressed to unnamed Secretary of the American Antiquarian Society regarding the membership of Marc Antony Lower, an English historian and a correspondent of JWT.
November 1, 1844	26	First meeting to found the New England Historic Genealogical Society. JWT serves as meeting secretary. The next meeting was scheduled for November 15, 1844 in JWT's office at 20 Court St., but due to other circumstances it did not occur then or there.
1845	26/27	Tabular Pedigree of the Thornton Family is published.
April 1845	26	Placed an advertisement in the new Saco, Maine newspaper, The Union. The ad reads: J. Wingate Thornton, Counsellor at Law, and Commissioner for Maine, New Hampshire, Vermont and North Cauolina. 20 Court Street, Boston (The Union, Saco, ME, Vol. 1, #10, April 11, 1845)
February 1847	28	Presents a copy of John Hancock's pamphlet An Exposulatory and Pacifick Letter; Rogers and Fowle, Boston; 1743; Small, 4to, 15 pp. to E[benezer] Adams. JWT's inscription, in pencil, is on the verso of the last leaf, as" J. W. Thorton to E. Adams", dated February 1847. Ebenezer Adams (1788–1881), a physician from Randolph, Massachusetts was also an antiquarian and book collector, and a member of the New England Historic Genealogical Society. He wrote several important works on the history of the medical profession in Massachusetts. He also made significant contributions to the medical literature. Alden's Medical Uses of Alcohol (1868) was an early argument for abandoning the use of alcohol as a therapeutic drug. John Hancock (1702–44) was pastor of the first Church of Christ in Braintree, Massachusetts, and the father of the Revolutionary statesman with the same name.
April, 1847	28	The Cotton Family article published in NEHGS Register.
October, 1847	29	The Gookin Family article is published in NEHGS Register.
December 29, 1847	29	Orders some cards with the names of his mother and father from Nathaniel Dearborn, Boston engraver.
May 31, 1848	29	Marries Elizabeth Wallace Bowles.
January, 1849	30	Original Settlers of Salisbury, Massachusetts article is published in NEHGS Register.
January, 1849	30	Refugees in London, 1775 article is published in NEHGS Register.
March 4, 1849	30	Premature birth (gestation of only 6 ½ months) of his first daughter named Elizabeth Wallace Bowles Thornton ("for her mother"). She was born on Sunday at 4:00 AM at the mansion of his in-law's (Bowles's) in Roxbury, Massachusetts.
March 7, 1849	30	Death of daughter (EWBT) on Wednesday, 4:00 PM at the Bowles mansion in Roxbury, Massachusetts at age 3 ½ days. EWBT was buried at "Mount Auburn" in grandfather Bowles' lot (So 1258 on Elder Path).
July 17, 1849	30	Is presented the five volume set of Alden's "A Collection of American Epitaphs" from his uncle, John Wingate Gookin in North Yarmouth, Maine. Item 12 in Catalogue of Private Library of JWT.
April, 1850	31	Rev. Nathaniel Gookin of Cambridge article is published in NEHGS Register.
July, 1850	31	The Gilbert Family article is published in NEHGS Register.
October, 1850	32	Part 2 of The Gilbert Family article is published in NEHGS Register.
1850	31/32	Tabular Pedigree of the Gilbert Wells, Thornton and Belcher Families is published.
1850	31/32	Lives of Isaac Heath and John Bowle, &c and Rev. John Bowles, Jr., privately printed, Roxbury, only 50 copies, 216 pp, is published.
October 1, 1850	32	A Genealogical Memoir of the Gilbert Family in both Old and New England, privately printed, Boston, only 50 copies, 23 pp (signed copy in my collection) is published.
July, 1851	32	The Shapleigh Family article is published in NEHGS Register.
1851	32/33	Mementos of the Swett Family : In Memoriam, privately printed, Roxbury, only 100 copies, 26 pp, is published.
January, 1852	33	The Swett Family article published in NEHGS Register.
October, 1852	34	A note on John Bowles is published in the NEHGS Register.
November 16, 1852	34	JWT letter to R. P. Anderson.
January, 1853	34	Pedigree of the Adams Family article is published in the NEHGS Register.
August 6, 1853	34	Birth of 2nd child, (and 2nd daughter), Elizabeth Wallace Thornton (EWT) named "for her grandmother Bowles" on Saturday at 4:00 PM in Roxbury, Massachusetts. EWT later changes her name to Elizabeth Thorndike Thornton (ETT) to honor the maiden name of her maternal grandmother. ETT was frequently called "Bessie" by her parents.
August 26, 1853	35	JWT inscribes a copy of A Sermon at the Lecture in Boston : After the Funerals of Those Excellent…; Printed by B. Green for Samuel Garrish & Daniel Henchman, Boston; 1717. This copy is now in the collection of the American Antiquarian Society.
September 9, 1853	35	JWT is at the bedside of his dying mother at the Oak Hill estate in Scarborough, Maine. He writes a letter to his wife on the state of his mother's illness. (NEHGS; R. Stanton Avery Special Collections Library; Boston, MA)
November 4, 1853	35	JWT and ETT are baptized, by Rev. James Brown Thornton Jr., at James Brown Thornton Sr's. Oak Hill estate in Scarborough, Maine. ETT is "baptized at her grandmother Thornton's sick bedside".
January 1854	35	Pedigree of Waldron article is published in NEHGS Register.
April, 1854	35	Orders in Council article is published in NEHGS Register.
July 27, 1854	35	JWT's mother, Elizabeth Gookin Thornton dies and is buried in Laurel Hill Cemetery, Saco, Maine.
October 28, 1854	36	JWT letter to Daniel Walker Lord (1800–1880) regarding JWT preparing a work of JWT's mother's poetical works.
1854	35/36	Tabular Pedigree of the Bowles Family is published.
1854	35/36	The Landing at Cape Anne, Boston, xii+84 pp, some 1855, dedicated to his father, is published.
1855	36/37	JWT presents a copy of Andrew Oliver's, An essay on comets, in two parts; Samuel Hall; Salem, MA; [3] leaves, vi, 87 pp, to ????. On the half- title there is a gift inscription from JWT dated 1855. His ownership signature is also on the front paste-down. Item 830 in Catalogue of Private Library of JWT
February 25, 1856	37	JWT writes a letter to his uncle, John Wingate Gookin regarding an historical document related to North Yarmouth, Maine, where JWG resides. ("The Daily Kennebec Journal"; 24 Apr 1912).
July, 1856	37	Addenda to the Article on the "Stowes" article is published in NEHGS Register.
November 1, 1856	38	His uncle, John Wingate Gookin dies in North Yarmouth, Maine. JWT pens JWG's obituary which is published in NEHGS Register, 1857, Vol. 11, Pg. 91. The obituary reads: GOOKIN, John Wingate, Esq., North Yarmouth, Me., 1 Nov., only son of the late Judge Daniel Gookin of New Hampshire. He was born in North Hampton, N. H., 27 June 1788. He was a captain in the U.S. Army during the war of 1812–1814, and in active service on the Lakes, honored by his brother officers as a brave and generous gentleman. He was of a lofty stature, of large person, and his military discipline left a lasting impression on his manners, giving him a peculiar dignity and elegance of address. He was one of the N. Hampshire Cincinnati, and a member of the N. H. Historical Society. He died as he had lived, a consistent, humble Christian. J.W.T.
1856 - 1857	38	Peter Oliver's "Puritan Commonwealth" Reviewed, appears as a series of articles in the Boston Evening Transcript. Issues are: 1856: 12/20; 1857: 1/2. 1/8, 1/13, 1/22, 1/23, 1/24, 1/29, 2/5, 2/9, 2/11, 2/18, 2/19, 2/21, 2/26, 3/4, 3/19, 3/25, 4/2 and 4/9.
July 22, 1857	38	Birth of 3rd child (and 3rd daughter), Agnes Winthrop Thornton, "named for her ancestors". She is born at 5:50 AM at Lakeside, Brookline.
1857	38/39	Ancient Pemaquid, privately printed, Portland, for Maine Historical Society, 168 pp, is published.
1857	38/39	Peter Oliver's "Puritan Commonwealth" Reviewed, privately printed, Boston, only 100 copies, 79 pp, is published.
November 5, 1857	39	JWT's daughter, Agnes Winthrop Thornton is "baptized in the old baptismal robe at Lakeside" at 9:15 PM by the Reverend Mr. George D. Wildes.
November 7, 1857	39	JWT's daughter, Agnes Winthrop Thornton, dies on Saturday at 11:00 AM, age 108 days. A short notice is published in the 1858 NEHGS Register. Vol. 12 p. 92. As with her sister EWBT, Agnes is buried at "Mount Auburn" in grandfather Bowles' lot, So 1258 on Elder Path.
November 16, 1857	39	Inscribes a copy of his book, Ancient Pemaquid, An Historical Review. It reads: Rev. Samuel Hopkins Riddell, with the Author's kind regards Boston Nov 16. 1857"
? 5, 1858	39/40	JWT writes a letter to William Foster, the probable author of a pamphlet on economics entitled A Society for the Special Study of Political Economy, Philosophy of History, and the Science of Government ....; A. Mudge & Son; Boston, 1857 8vo. The pamphlet is an explanation of a plan to establish an academy in Boston to research, consider, and advise the nation on the best means of improving its government: "... to approach to that ideal perfection of government prescribed by Bacon, Mansfield, Blackstone, Montesqieu and the host of encyclopedists." The author of the pamphlet is anonymous but is likely to have been William Foster. This is deduced by the fact that a specific existent copy of the pamphlet is accompanied by a letter from JWT commenting on the scheme and is addressed to Foster. Thornton makes direct references to the proposal in the body of the letter. It is clear from the text that Foster had asked Thornton to be a member of this academy.
1859	40/41	Inscribes a copy of First Records of Anglo-American Colonization to William Willis.
May 30, 1859	40	Inscribes a copy of First Records of Anglo-American Colonization to "Nahum Caper, Esq. With the authors Respects, May 30th. 1859".
June, 1859	40	Inscribes a copy of First Records of Anglo-American Colonization to "Hon. Robert Hallowell Gardner with the best respect of J. W. Thornton. June 1859".
June 9, 1859	40	Inscribes a copy of First Records of Anglo-American Colonization to Hon. James Dixon (of CT). June 9, 1859.
July, 1859	40	Letter of Thomas Deane to Joseph Dudley article is published in NEHGS Register.
1859	40/41	First Records of Anglo-American Colonization, privately printed, Boston, only 250 copies, is published.
1860	41/42	The Pulpit of the American Revolution, 1st edition, xxxviii+537 pp, is published.
1860	42	In the 1860 US Census for Brookline, Norfolk County, MA (Roll: M653_514 Page: 776) is the following listing: John W. Thornton, Age 42, Male, Lawyer, Real Estate value = $6000, Personal Estate value = $2000, Born in ME; Elizabeth W. B. Thornton, Age 31, Female, Born in ME; Elizabeth W. Thornton, Age 7, Female, Born in MA, Attends school. Macy E. Carroll, Age 18, Female, Servant, Born in MA.
December 25, 1860	42	Presents an inscribed copy of his book, The Pulpit of the American Revolution to his wife. The inscription reads: To my dear wife Lizzie W. B. Thornton - Dec. 25, 1860 - Lakeside -.
1862	43/44	Delivers a speech at the Popham Celebration.
1863	44/45	Colonial Schemes of Popham and Gorges : Speech at the Fort Popham Celebration, August 29, 1862, 20 pp, is published.
December 20, 1864	46	Presents a large (18" x 51 ¼") document entitled Of the Parole of Officers of Burgoyne's Army after the Surrender at Saratoga, October 1777 to the Boston Public Library. The inscription reads " Presented to the Boston Public Library by J. Wingate Thornton, December 20, 1864". Supposedly, the Paroles were given to him by the grandson of Maj. Gen. Heath. A full-sized facsimile of this document was published in the Bulletins of the Boston Public Library, Vol. II Numbers 88–91, April 1892 - January 1893.
October 3, 1865	47	Birth of first son (and 4th child), Henry Thornton Thornton on Tuesday at 5:00 AM at JBT's Oak Hill estate in Scarborough, Maine. (History of the Wingate Family, p. 245 and NEHGS JWT's Personal Genealogy book in Box 1).
May 29, 1866	47	Writes a letter to John P. Prendergast, requesting information on Gookin genealogy. See Memoirs.
November 13, 1866	48	Writes a letter to John P. Prendergast, thanking him for Gookin genealogy information. See Memoirs.
1869	50/51	D'Amerie, Emory, Amory, Reprinted from Oct. 1869 NEGHS Register, Boston, 6 pp is published.
1870	51/52	Materials for a history of Machias, Maine; Historical Magazine, Ser. 2, Jul. - Aug., 1870; pp 8:39-43, 89–94, is published.
1870	51/52	Speech given to NEHGS regarding the 250th Anniversary of the Signing of the Mayflower Compact. This speech caused quite a stir and it was not included in the published proceedings, so he later privately printed them.
1871	52/53	Travels to the Lake Superior region for the second time and for a longer duration. The first trip to this area was to aid in recovery from a severe illness.
1872	53/54	Moves from Brookline, Massachusetts to Winthrop, Massachusetts.
1872	53/54	Takes a three-month-long trip to Europe. Visits Paris, but spends most of his time in England and Ireland.
February 13, 1873	54	JWT's father, John Brown Thornton, dies on his Oak Hill estate in Scarborough, Maine and is buried in Laurel Hill Cemetery, Saco, Maine.
March 29, 1873	54	JWT letter to Mr. Bates regarding parentage of Robert and John Carver. Letter is addressed from his office at 20 Court St., Boston, Massachusetts.
September 4, 1873	56	Office postcard from JWT to Charles D. Eliot of Somerville, MA.
1874	55/56	The Historical Relation of New England to the English Commonwealth, Boston, 105 pp, is published.
November 7, 1874	56	Letter from Frederick William Gookin, who later authored The Life of Major General Daniel Gookin, 1612-1687 (1912), a project started by JWT but finished by FWG. (10547-AY McGregor Box No. 4, Folder Dates 1808-193, Heading: Gookin; Albert and Shirley Small Special Collections Library; University of Virginia; Charlottesville, VA)
April 12, 1875	56	JWT receives a letter from George William Curtis(West New Brighton, Staten Island, NY) regarding JWT's book, The Historical Relation of New England to the English Commonwealth.
June 9, 1875	56	JWT letter to Mr. Phineas Bates Jr. Letter is addressed from 40 Water St., Boston, Massachusetts.
1876	57/58	Pulpit of the American Revolution, 2nd edition, is published.
June 9, 1876	57	JWT's son Henry dies at 2:30 PM at Miss Tyler's School in Brattleboro, Vermont of diphtheria. Like his other two deceased siblings, he is buried (at least initially) at "Mount Auburn" in grandfather Bowles' lot (So 1258 on Elder Path). He may have been later re-interred next to his father's grave in Laurel Hill Cemetery in Saco, ME. JWT writes in his Personal Genealogy book (NEHGS, Box 1), "Woe is me. My staff is broken, my light is put out." He also writes, "My only son Henry Thornton. b. 3 Oct 1856 [65] - died June 9, 1876 - leaving me with no one to perpetuate my name; alone indeed! I care little for all this now." (NEHGS, Box 4, Folder 138). Also mentioned in JWT's Memorial by Thomas C. Amory is published in the NEHGS Register (Vol. 33, p 275) and privately published in Boston in 1879 and including a bibliography. (History of the Wingate Family, p. 245)
1877	58/59	In Memoriam. James Brown Thornton, 1794 - 1873, Boston, 8 pp Reprinted with additions from Jul. 1877 NEGHS Register, is published.
December, 1877	59	Falls ill with the disease that will kill him within seven months. ("Report of The Council" Proceedings of the American Antiquarian Society. 8: 21–22. 1879).
June 6, 1878	59	Dies at the Oak Hill estate in Scarborough, Maine just days after his 30th wedding anniversary (May 31). He is buried at Laurel Hill Cemetery, Saco, Maine. His memorial / obituary by Thomas Coffin Amory is published in the NEHGS Register (Vol. 33, 1879; pp 273–84) and privately published in Boston in 1879 and including a bibliography. (Obit. in the June 8, 1878 edition of the Portland Daily Press reads: "At Oak Hill, June 6, John Wingate Thornton, of Boston, Mass.")

== Published works ==
- Memorial Of The American Statistical Association Praying The Adoption Of Measures For The Correction Of Errors In The Census, 1844; OCLC 13848351
- Lives of Isaac Heath, and John Bowles, ... and of Rev. John Eliot jr, 1850; OCLC 3824853
- Memoir of the Gilbert Family, 1850; OCLC 13990800
- Mementos of the Swett Family, 1851; OCLC 16395396
- Landing at Cape Anne, 1854; OCLC 5382334
- Ancient Pemaquid, 1857; OCLC 23935503
- Peter Oliver's "Puritan Commonwealth" Reviewed, 1857; OCLC 10820661
- First Records of Anglo-American Colonization, 1859; OCLC 6414115
- Pulpit of the American Revolution, or, The political sermons of the period of 1776, 1860; OCLC 249633623
- Colonial Schemes of Popham and Gorges : Speech at the Fort Popham Celebration, August 29, 1862, 1863; OCLC 5362353
- Historical Relation of New England to the English Commonwealth, 1874; OCLC 950363

== Institutional Resources ==
American Antiquarian Society, Worcester, Mass.
John Wingate Thornton Papers, 1850–1877. Mss. Dept. Misc. mss. Boxes "T". 1 Folder, 98 items.
Composed mainly of correspondence related to his publications and especially regarding his Popham Celebration speech.

Bowdoin College Library, Brunswick, Maine
Alumni Biographical File, John Wingate Thornton
George J. Mitchell Department of Special Collections and Archives.
Catalog Number 1.3.6. Box 1. Folder 54, John Wingate Thornton.

Boston Athenaeum, Boston, Mass.
John Wingate Thornton Papers
Book containing letters to children and family photographs.

Boston Public Library, Boston, Mass.
Rare Books and Manuscripts Dept.
19 July 1842 Letter from Elizabeth (Schuyler) Hamilton, New York, NY to JWT. *Ch.C.12.2
19 Apr 1844 Letter from Oliver Wendell Holmes (1809–1894) to JWT. *Ch.B.10.74
11 Apr 1849 Letter from Frances M. Caulkins, New London, CT to JWT. Ch.A.6.75
10 ??? 18x8 Letter from JWT to William Fogg, York, ME. Ch.B.11.8
08 Dec 1854 Letter from JWT to R. W. Griswold, Boston, MA. Griswold Mss. No. 1081
09 Nov 1855 Letter from JWT to Mellen Chamberlain, Boston, MA. Ch.J.2.117
Various Letters (5) from JWT to Mellen Chamberlain, Boston, MA. Ms.Am.1400 (1114)
16 Dec 1857 Letter from Samuel McPherson Janey (1801–1880) to JWT. Ch.E.1.1
13 Mar 1858 Letter from George Edward Ellis (1814–1894), Charlestown, MA to JWT. Ch.J.1.98
22 Mar 1858 Letter from Joseph Willard (1798–1865), antiquarian, to JWT. Ch.J.3.23
21 Apr 1858 Letter from D. Foley(Rectory, Templetuoby, Ireland) to JWT. Ch.B.5.80
1862 Papers relating to the acquisition by BPL of Gen. Burgoyne parole. Ms.1258
18 Oct 186x Letter from William Willis (1794–1870), to JWT. *Ch.J.7.112
1866 Mss and letters (2) from Edward Jarvis (1803–1884) to JWT. Ms. 1337
24 Nov 1868 Letter from Timothy Farrar, Dorchester, Mt. Bowdoin to JWT. Ch.A.8.14
03 Dec 1874 Revere Beach and Lynn Railroad Co., Boston, MA (Mss notes by JWT). No. 1 in **H.30.446
01 Jul 1875 Letter from Charles Cotesworth Pinckney (1812–1898) to JWT . Ch.J.2.72
01 Mar 1876 Letter from Benjamin Franklin DeCosta (1831–1904), New York, NY to JWT. Ch.J.6.7
Undated Letter from H. Sowerby to JWT. Ch.E.4.65A

Dyer Library and Saco Museum, Saco, Maine
Thornton Family Papers
Dyer Library Archives & Special Collections
17 May 1859 Letter from Sarah Gookin Storer to John Wingate Thornton. Dyer Library.

Houghton Library, Harvard College, Cambridge, Mass.
02 Oct 1848 Letter from John Wingate Thornton to George Livermore. Autograph File T.
23 Jul 1851 Letter from George Stillman Hillard to John Wingate Thornton. Autograph File H.
26 Dec 1860 Letter from Jared Sparks to John Wingate Thornton. Autograph File S.
24 Jan 1866 Letter from John Wingate Thornton to Mary Cutts. Autograph File T.
11 Jan 1873 Letter from Charles William Eliot to John Wingate Thornton. Autograph File E.
16 Jan 1873 Letter from John Wingate Thornton to Charles William Eliot. Autograph File E.
19 Mar 1874 Letter from John Wingate Thornton to Samuel Batchelder. Batchelder Family Papers. Call No.: MS Am 1368; Item 195.
26 Oct 1875 Letter from John Wingate Thornton to Samuel Batchelder. Batchelder Family Papers. Call No.: MS Am 1368; Item 196.
15 Feb 1876 Letter from John Wingate Thornton to Capt. H. Hight. Autograph File T.

Maine Historical Society, Portland, Maine
Thornton, John Wingate, 1818–1878, Spec Coll. 1523
Contains note correspondence (1842–1877), pertaining to the Chipman, Crocker, Cutts, Ellis, Peperell, Scammon, Thaxter, Smith, and other families. Also contains biographical and genealogical material relating to Edward Godfrey, Habijah Savage, Joshua Scottow, Robert Jordan, and Captain Thomas Cammock. Lawyer, antiquarian, historian, author, and founder of New England Historical Genealogical Society. b. in Saco, Me.. resident of Boston.

Maine State Library and Archives, Augusta, Maine
John Wingate Thornton, Collected Papers, MS091 T513
Vol. 1 1658–1877, Vol. 2 1800–1814, Vol. 3 1815–1877

New England Historic And Genealogical Society, Boston, Mass.
John W. Thornton Papers, Mss 95, R. Stanton Avery Special Collections Department
NEHGS houses the premier collection of John Wingate Thornton papers. They comprise approximately 2 linear feet of shelf space. As NEHGS describes them, they contain "genealogical, historical, business and personal papers of the Thornton and 37 allied families of Saco, ME, and North Hampton, N.H. Items of interest include:
02 Jan 1838 Letter from John Fairfield to John Wingate Thornton. Box 2; Folder 25.
22 May 1840 Letter from John Fairfield to John Wingate Thornton. Box 2; Folder 25.
20 Jun 1842 Letter from John Wingate Gookin to John Wingate Thornton. Box 4; Folder 121.
24 Oct 1842 Letter from John Wingate Gookin to John Wingate Thornton. Box 4; Folder 121.
27 Dec 1842 Letter from John Wingate Gookin to John Wingate Thornton. Box 4; Folder 121.
02 Nov 1843 Letter from James Brown Thornton Sr. to John Wingate Thornton. Box 2; Folder 39.
08 Dec 1843 Letter from Harriette Gookin Storer to John Wingate Thornton. Box 4; Folder 128.
15 Dec 1843 Letter from John Fairfield to John Wingate Thornton. Box 2; Folder 25.
24 Feb 1844 Letter from John Fairfield to John Wingate Thornton. Box 2; Folder 25.
07 Apr 1844 Letter from Eliza Gookin Thornton to John Wingate Thornton. Box 2; Folder 40.
25 May 1844 Family memorial, signed by family members at a gathering in Saco, Maine.
07 Nov 1845 Letter from Albert Gookin Thornton to John Wingate Thornton. Box 2; Folder 38.
07 Nov 1845 Letter from Thomas Gilbert Thornton to John Wingate Thornton. Box 2; Folder 40.
22 Dec 1845 Letter from James Brown Thornton Sr. to John Wingate Thornton. Box 2; Folder 39.
10 Jan 1846 Letter from James Brown Thornton Sr. to John Wingate Thornton. Box 2; Folder 39.
02 Feb 1846 Letter from James Brown Thornton Sr. to John Wingate Thornton. Box 2; Folder 39.
11 Jul 1846 Letter from James Brown Thornton Sr. to John Wingate Thornton. Box 2; Folder 39.
18 Jul 1846 Letter from Rev. Henry Gookin Storer to John Wingate Thornton. Box 2; Folder 37.
22 Jun 1846 Letter from John Fairfield to John Wingate Thornton. Box 2; Folder 25.
08 Dec 1846 Letter from John Wingate Gookin to John Wingate Thornton. Box 4; Folder 121.
30 Jan 1847 Letter from John Fairfield to John Wingate Thornton. Box 2; Folder 25.
31 Mar 1847 Letter from John Fairfield to John Wingate Thornton. Box 2; Folder 25.
11 Apr 1847 Letter from John Fairfield to John Wingate Thornton. Box 2; Folder 25.
21 Apr 1847 Letter from John Fairfield to John Wingate Thornton. Box 2; Folder 25.
25 Apr 1847 Letter from John Fairfield to John Wingate Thornton. Box 2; Folder 25.
16 Jul 1847 Letter from John Wingate Thornton to Eliza Gookin Thornton. Box 2; Folder 40.
01 Feb 1848 Letter from Anna Paine Fairfield to John Wingate Thornton. Box 2; Folder 25.
24 Mar 1848 Letter from Rev. Henry Gookin Storer to John Wingate Thornton. Box 2; Folder 37.
30 Mar 1848 Letter from Anna Paine Fairfield to John Wingate Thornton. Box 2; Folder 25.
11 Apr 1848 Letter from Eliza Gookin Thornton to John Wingate Thornton. Box 2; Folder 38.
27 May 1848 Letter from Eliza Gookin Thornton to John Wingate Thornton. Box 2; Folder 40.
29 Jul 1848 Letter from Anna Paine Fairfield to John Wingate Thornton. Box 2; Folder 25.
03 Feb 1850 Letter from Eliza Gookin Thornton to John Wingate Thornton. Box 2; Folder 40.
23 Apr 1850 Letter from Charles Cutts Gookin Thornton to John Wingate Thornton. Box 2; Folder 38.
04 Jul 1850 Letter from Eliza Gookin Thornton to John Wingate Thornton. Box 2; Folder 40.
19 Jul 1850 Letter from Eliza Gookin Thornton to John Wingate Thornton. Box 2; Folder 40.
29 Oct 1850 Letter from Eliza Gookin Thornton to John Wingate Thornton. Box 2; Folder 40.
01 Nov 1850 Letter from Eliza Gookin Thornton to John Wingate Thornton. Box 2; Folder 40.
08 Nov 1850 Letter from Eliza Gookin Thornton to John Wingate Thornton. Box 2; Folder 40.
15 Feb 1851 Letter from Eliza Gookin Thornton to John Wingate Thornton. Box 2; Folder 40.
09 Sep 1851 Letter from James Brown Thornton Sr. to John Wingate Thornton. Box 2; Folder 40.
09 Sep 1853 Letter from John Wingate Thornton to Elizabeth Bowles Thornton. Box 2; Folder 40.
07 Jul 1857 Letter from George Wingate Gookin to John Wingate Thornton. Box 4; Folder 118.
23 Jul 1857 Letter from George Wingate Gookin to John Wingate Thornton. Box 4; Folder 118.
26 Nov 1860 Letter from Sarah Gookin Storer to John Wingate Thornton. Box 4; Folder 118.
04 Jan 1861 Letter from Sarah Gookin Storer to John Wingate Thornton. Box 2; Folder 40.
Undated Letter from Sarah Gookin Storer to John Wingate Thornton. Box 5; Folder 155.
Undated Land Deed from John Wingate Thornton to Daniel Gookin. Box 5; Folder 156.
Various John Wingate Thornton's personal family genealogy book. Box 1

Social Law Library, Boston, Mass.
The Social Law Library holds a copy of a rare book (Wingate, Edmond. Maximes of Reason . 1658) that was previously owned by John Wingate Thornton. In addition, in their Willard Photograph Collection, they have an original photograph of John Wingate Thornton.
Undated. Photograph, John Wingate Thornton. Boston, Mass. Willard Photograph Collection

University of Michigan, Ann Arbor, MI
Special Collections Library
09 Apr 1875 Letter from Wendell Phillips to John Wingate Thornton. Univ. of MI.

University of Virginia, Charlottesville, VA
Albert and Shirley Small Special Collections Library
07 Nov 1874 Letter from Frederick William Gookin to John Wingate Thornton. Univ. of VA.

== See also ==
- Thornton Academy
