= 1864 Boston mayoral election =

Election in Massachusetts, United States

- December 12, 1864
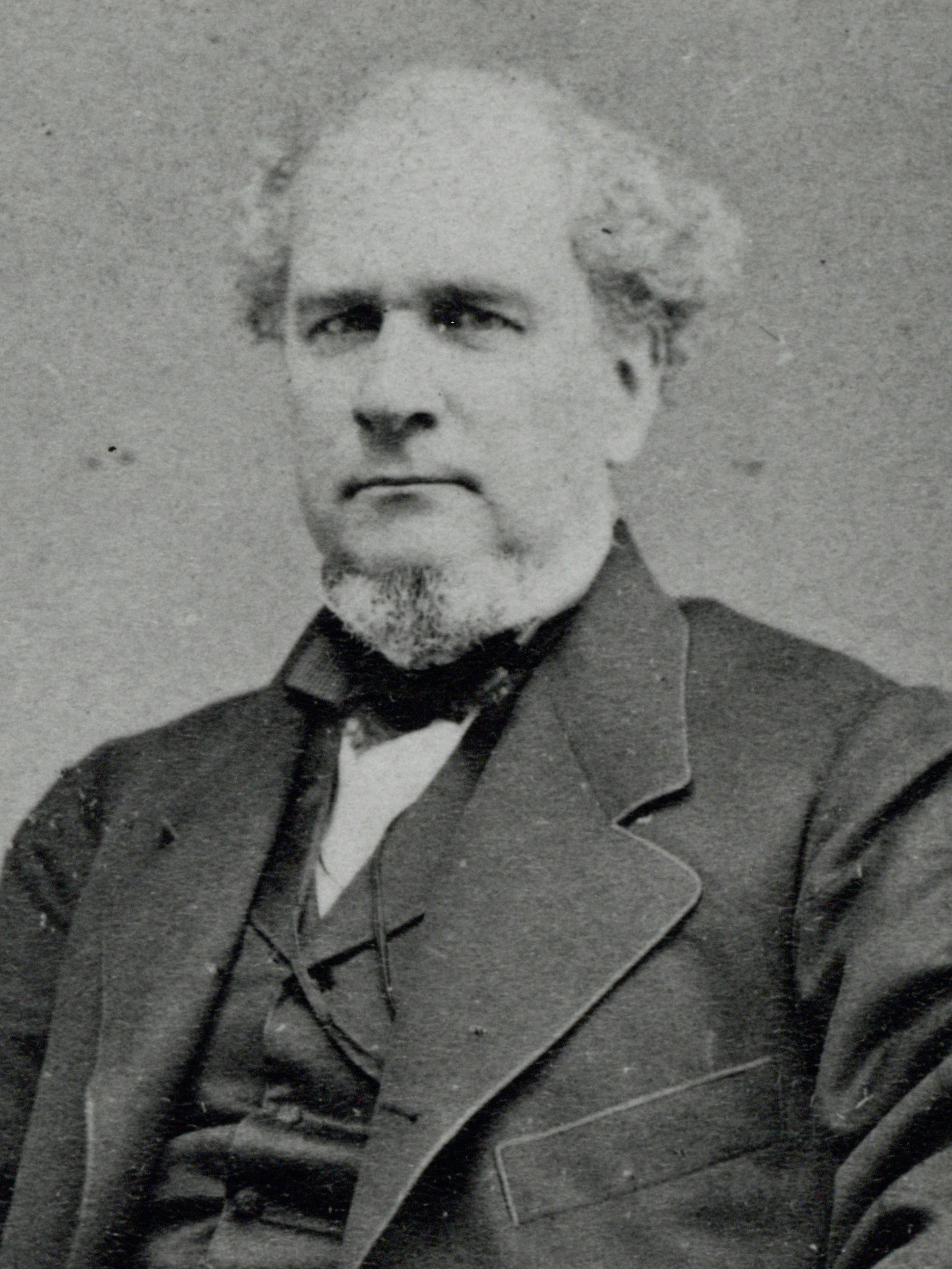

Candidate	Frederic W. Lincoln Jr.	Thomas Coffin Amory
Party	Republican	Democratic
Popular vote	6,877	2,732
Percentage	71.41%	28.37%
Mayor before election
Frederic W. Lincoln Jr.
Republican
Elected mayor
Frederic W. Lincoln Jr.
Republican

The 1864 Boston mayoral election was held on December 12, 1864 and saw Frederic W. Lincoln Jr. reelected to a sixth overall term.

== Campaign ==
Mayor Frederic W. Lincoln Jr. was renominated by the Republican Party, which ran under the "Union Republican" banner amid the ongoing American Civil War. Lincoln's opponent, Thomas Coffin Amory, accepted the nomination of the Democratic Party in a letter that was read on his behalf to the December 2, 1864 meeting of the city's Democratic Ward and City Committee.

The Boston Evening Transcript characterized Mayor Lincoln as a strong front-runner, writing on December 3, 1864, "there can be no doubt ever of the triumphant re-election of Mayor Lincoln and his associates on the Union Republican ticket." After the election, the Boston Evening Transcript wrote that the election of Lincoln and the Union Republican nominees for other municipal offices had been a "foregone conclusion".

== Results ==
The Boston Evening Transcript described the margins of the victory received Lincoln and his fellow Union Republican nominees for city offices were, "extraordinarily large". It also characterized the turnout for the election as, "small" when compared to that of the 1864 United States presidential election that was held in November.

1864 Boston mayoral election
Party	Candidate	Votes	%
Republican	Frederic W. Lincoln Jr. (incumbent)	6,877	71.41
Democratic	Thomas Coffin Amory	2,732	28.37
Others	Scattering	21	0.22
Turnout		9,630	

== See also ==
- List of mayors of Boston, Massachusetts
