= Thomas Coffin Amory =

American poet (1812–1889)

- Born: October 6, 1812; Boston, Massachusetts, U.S.
- Died: August 20, 1889 (aged 76)
- Education: Harvard College
- Occupations: Lawyer; politician; biographer; poet

Thomas Coffin Amory Jr. (October 6, 1812 – August 20, 1889) was an American lawyer, historian, politician, biographer, and poet. He served as chairman of the Boston Board of Aldermen. He published on the American Revolution and his own ancestors.

== Early life ==
Amory was born in Boston, Massachusetts, the youngest son of Jonathan Amory and his wife Mehitable (Sullivan) Cutler. He graduated from Harvard College in 1830. He became a member of the bar of Suffolk County, Boston in 1834. He served in the legislature of Massachusetts and in the municipal government of Boston.

== Career ==
In 1858 he published "Life of James Sullivan" about the former governor of Massachusetts and his grandfather. He later published extensively on the American Revolution as well as on various others of his ancestors, including Major-General John Sullivan and Sir Isaac Coffin. He also wrote numerous poems, the best known of which, "William Blaxton, Sole Inhabitant of Boston" was written at a time when the Old South Church of Boston was threatened with demolition. The poem is said to have contributed to saving the church. In 1858, Amory was elected a member of the American Antiquarian Society. In 1863, Armory served as the chairman of the Boston Board of Aldermen.

Amory declined to run as the Whig nominee in the second vote of the 1853–54 Boston mayoral election, despite being offered the party's nomination. He ran as the Democratic nominee in the 1864 Boston mayoral election, losing by a large margin.

== Death ==
Amory died August 20, 1889.

== See also ==
Amory-Ticknor House

== Works ==
Biographies

- The Life of James Sullivan: With Selections from his Writings. 1859
- The Military Services and Public Life of Major-General John Sullivan of the American Revolutionary Army. 1868
- Old Cambridge and New. 1871
- Our English Ancestors. 1872
- General Sullivan not a pensioner of Luzerne. 1875
- Transfer of Erin: or The Acquisition of Ireland by England. 1877
- Memoir of John Wingate Thornton. 1879
- Memoir of Hon. Richard Sullivan. 1885
- The Life of Admiral Sir Isaac Coffin, baronet, his English and American ancestors. 1886
- Class Memoir of George Washington Warren, with English and American Ancestry. 1886
- William Blaxton.1886

Poetry

- William Blackstone, Boston's First Inhabitant 1877
- Charles River: A Poem 1888
- Siege of Newport. 1888
