= William Molineux =

Hardware merchant (c. 1713–1774)

- Born: c. 1713; England, Great Britain
- Died: 22 October 1774 (aged c. 61)
- Political party: Radical Whig

William Molineux (c. 1713 – October 22, 1774) was a hardware merchant in colonial Boston of Irish descent best known for his role in the Boston Tea Party of 1773 and earlier political protests.

== Popular culture ==
He is a featured character in the 2012 video game, Assassin's Creed III.

== Bibliography ==
- Bell, J. L. "William Molineux, Forgotten Revolutionary"
- Tyler, John W. Smugglers & Patriots: Boston Merchants and the Advent of the American Revolution. Boston: Northeastern University Press, 1986. ISBN 0-930350-76-6.
- New England Magazine, Volume 9.
