= Samuel Gardner Drake =

American antiquarian (1798–1875)

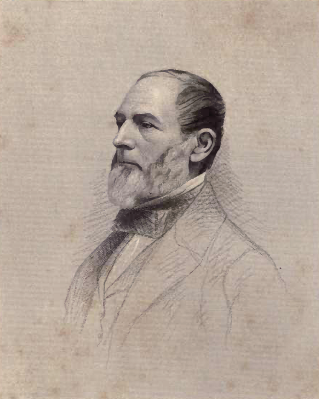
- Engraving by Stephen Alonzo Schoff
- Born: October 11, 1798; Pittsfield, New Hampshire, US
- Died: June 14, 1875 (aged 76); Boston, Massachusetts, US
- Children: Samuel Adams Drake; Francis Samuel Drake

Samuel Gardner Drake (October 11, 1798 – June 14, 1875) was an American antiquarian, writer and historian.

== Biography ==
Drake was born in Pittsfield, New Hampshire. His father, Simeon Drake, was initially a farmer like his four brothers, but sold his homestead in 1805 to open a store in neighboring Northwood. His mother, Love Muchmore Drake (née Tucke), was the daughter of a minister. Drake was named Samuel after his mother's eldest brother, Samuel J. Tucke, and the middle name Gardner derives from Samuel J. Tucke's wife's maiden name.

Drake was educated in the common schools, and from 1818 to 1825 taught in a district school. He was fond of literary pursuits, and in 1828 he went to Boston, where he established an antiquarian bookstore — the first of its kind in the United States — and devoted himself to the study of early United States history. He continued to do business as a bookseller and publisher during his life, and the most noted writers of his day availed themselves of the store of information that he had collected.

He was one of the founders (1847) of the New England Historic Genealogical Society, was its president in 1858, and for many years was the editor of its quarterly Register, contributing many articles to its pages. In 1858-60 he resided in London, England.

Drake died of pneumonia in Boston on June 14, 1875, aged 76.

== Works ==
- Indian Biography (1832)
- The Book of the Indians (1833)
- The Old Indian Chronicle (1836)
- Indian Captivities (1839)
- Genealogical and Biographical Account of the Family of Drake in America (1845)
- Biography and History of the Indians of North America (1849)
- The History and Antiquities of Boston (1856)
- The Aboriginal Races of North America (1859)
- Result of Some Researches Among the British Archives for Information Relative to the Founders of New England (1860)
- A Brief Memoir of Sir Walter Ralegh (1862)
- Annals of Witchcraft in New England (1869)
- A Particular History of the Five Years French and Indian War (1870)
- Early History of Georgia, Embracing the Embassy of Sir Alexander Cuming to the Country of the Cherokees, in the Year 1730 (1872)

He edited:

- Thomas Church, The History of King Philip's War (1825)
- Increase Mather, The History of King Philip's War (1862)
- Increase Mather, Early History of New England (1864)
- William Hubbard, The History of the Indian Wars in New England (1865)

== See also ==
- Prince Society

== Notes ==
Preceded by William Whiting	President of the New England Historic Genealogical Society; 1858–1859	Succeeded by Almon D. Hodges
