= Prince Society =

Published rare American works, founded by Samuel Gardner Drake in Boston

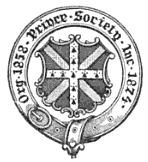

The Prince Society, or Prince Society for Mutual Publication, (1858-1944) in Boston, Massachusetts, published "rare works, in print or manuscript, relating to America." It was named after Thomas Prince, fifth pastor of Old South Church in Boston. Historian Samuel Gardner Drake founded the society because he "had not been made a member of the Massachusetts Historical Society, and he resented it." Officials of the Prince Society included William Sumner Appleton, John Ward Dean, Charles E. Goodspeed, Edmund F. Slafter, John Wingate Thornton, and William Henry Whitmore. It operated from offices in Bromfield Street (ca.1868) and Somerset Street (ca.1872, 1908). Around 1920 society members "realized at last that a publication society 'on the mutual principle' had become an anomaly in this day and generation." The society continued for several "years of poise before the final leap into the abyss" in 1944.
