= Stephen Alonzo Schoff =

Self-portrait, engraving by Stephen A. Schoff

S.A. Schoff, Etching by J.B. Small after a painting by A.B. Durand

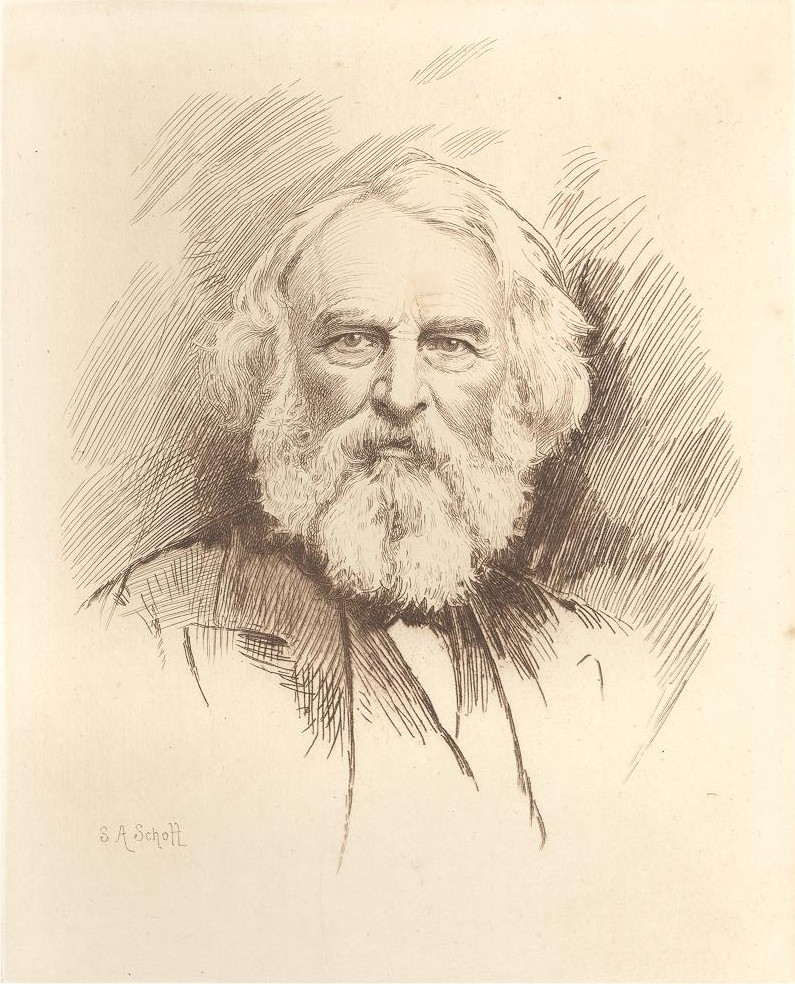
Henry Wadsworth Longfellow, Etching by S.A. Schoff

Stephen Alonzo Schoff (January 16, 1818 – May 6, 1904) was an American engraver and etcher in New York and Boston.

== Biography ==
Stephen Alonzo Schoff was born in Danville, Vermont, January 16, 1818, and grew up in Newburyport, Massachusetts. He took up engraving at age 16 as an apprentice under Oliver Pelton of Boston, and then studied under Joseph Andrews, a more accomplished Boston engraver, with whom he visited Europe in 1839. He spent about two years in Paris, studying drawing at the school of Hippolyte Delaroche, and perfecting himself in his art. While in Europe he befriended Asher B. Durand, John William Casilear and John Frederick Kensett.

After his return to the United States he was soon employed upon his first important work, "Caius Marius on the Ruins of Carthage," after John Vanderlyn. This plate was issued about 1843 by the Apollo Association (later known as the American Art-Union). In 1844 he was accepted as an Associate Member of the National Academy of Design. Schoff was employed by a number of bank note companies, including: Toppan, Carpenter & Company, the John A. Lowell Company of Boston, the Continental Bank Note Company, the National Bank Note Company, and the American Bank Note Company of New York. In 1858 he kept a studio in Boston on Washington Street and lived in Newtonville. He was also employed at the U.S. Bureau of Engraving and Printing for three or four years starting in 1869.

Schoff befriended the American artist William Morris Hunt during the 1860s and engraved or etched a number of plates after Hunt's works. Schoff was best known for his portraiture. His portrait of Ralph Waldo Emerson after a sketch by Samuel W. Rowse was considered one of his best. Among his other noteworthy portraits are Oliver Wendell Holmes Sr., Henry Wadsworth Longfellow, Nathaniel Hawthorne, George Eliot, John Greenleaf Whittier, Walt Whitman, Emanuel Swedenborg and a self-portrait after a W.H.W. Bicknell photograph.

His work took on a freer, looser appearance in the later part of his career. Schoff’s was able to overcome the rigidity of line engraving and adapted to the newer forms of etching that were then becoming popular. Sylvester Rosa Koehler, curator of the print departments at the Boston Museum of Fine Arts and the Smithsonian Institution, published a number of books and portfolios which included etchings by Schoff. He remained productive until two years prior to his death in Norfolk, Connecticut on May 6, 1904.

Schoff lived in a number of locations, including New York, Washington D.C., Connecticut, and Vermont, but for most of his life he resided in Newton, Massachusetts, where he was a long-standing member of the Swedenborgian New Jerusalem Church.

== Legacy ==
S.A. Schoff received his greatest recognition in 1979, some 75 years after his death, when the Smithsonian Institution presented an exhibition entitled “An Engraver’s Potpourri, The Life and Times of a 19th Century Banknote Engraver” with a collection of prints and engravings he collected during his lifetime. The Smithsonian still maintains a “Schoff Collection” as part of their “150 Years of Print Collecting at the Smithsonian” exhibit. There are also large collections of his work housed in the print rooms of the Library of Congress, Boston Museum of Fine Arts and the New York Public Library.

== Image gallery ==
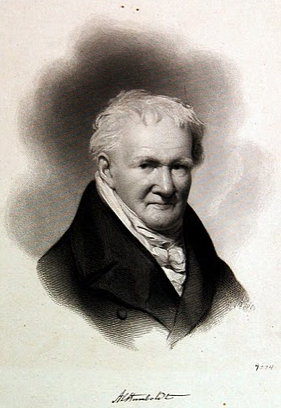
Portrait of Alexander von Humboldt, by Moses Wight; engraving by Schoff, 1856

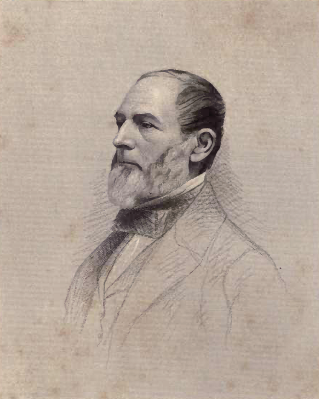
Portrait of Samuel Gardner Drake, 1863

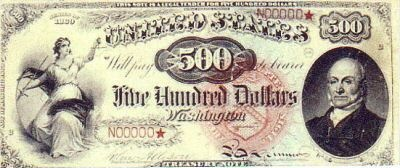
1869

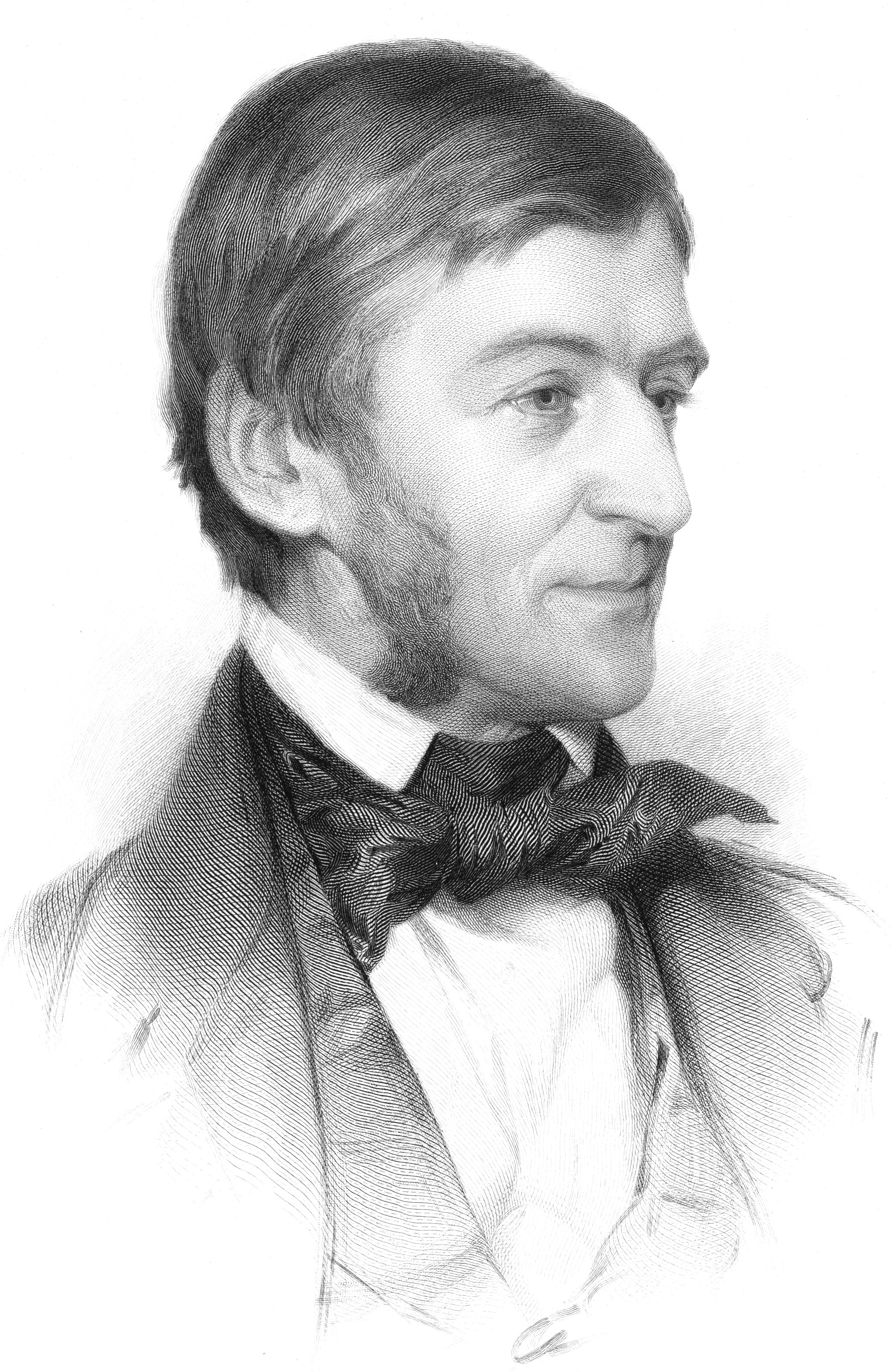
Portrait of Ralph Waldo Emerson by Sam W. Rowse; engraving by Schoff

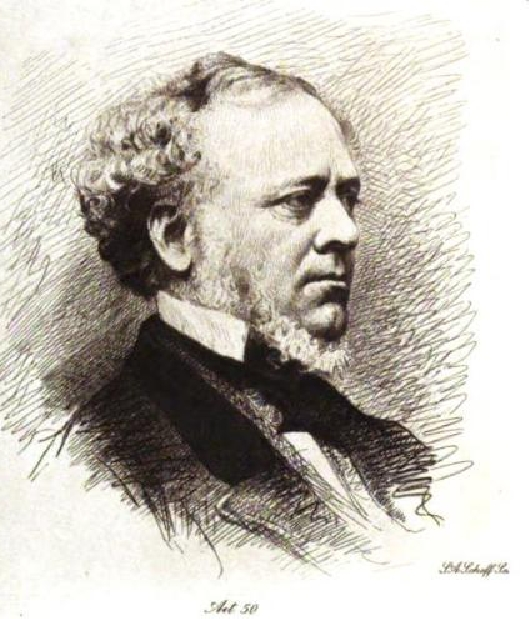
Etching of William Ticknor by Schoff

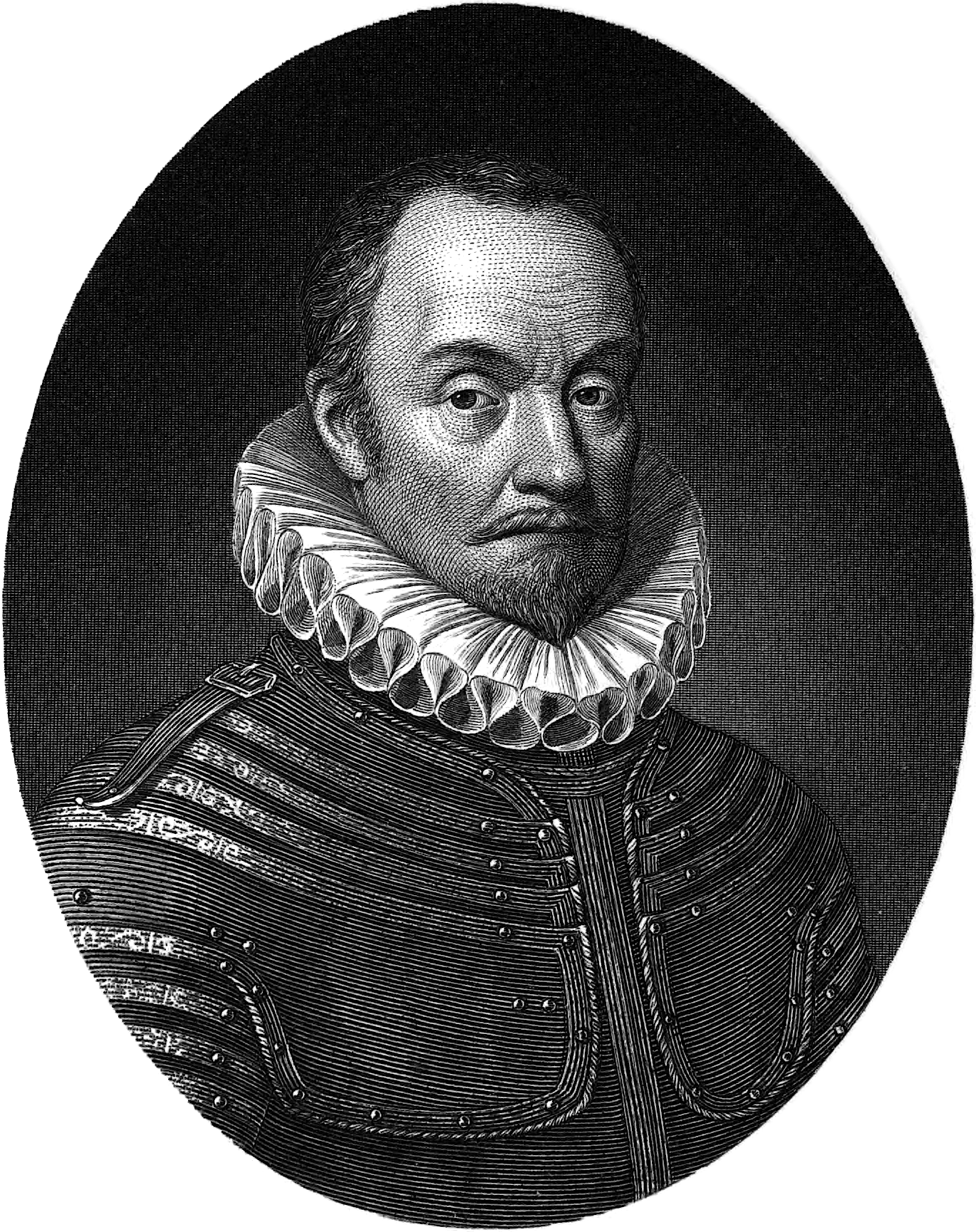
Engraving of William the Silent by Schoff, 1857
