= William Henry Whitmore =

American politician (1836–1900)

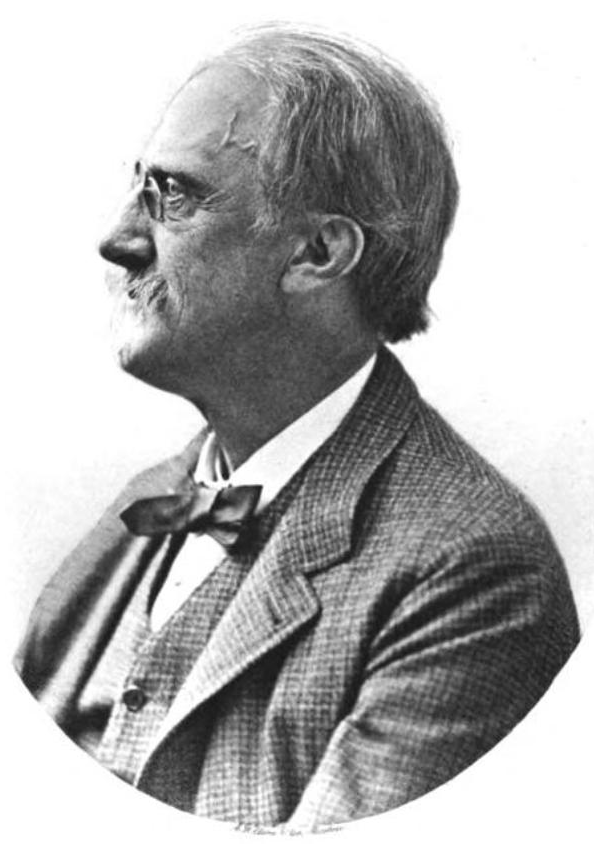
- Born: September 6, 1836; Dorchester, Massachusetts
- Died: June 14, 1900 (aged 63); Boston, Massachusetts
- Occupations: Businessman, politician, genealogist
- Spouse: Fanny Therese Walling Maynard (m. 1884)
- Children: 1

William Henry Whitmore (September 6, 1836 – June 14, 1900) was a Boston businessman, politician and genealogist.

== Early life and career ==
William Henry Whitmore was born in Dorchester, Massachusetts, on September 6, 1836. He was the son of a Boston merchant, and was educated in Boston's public schools. He devoted the leisure from his business life to antiquarian research and authorship. For eight years, he was a member of the Boston Common Council, of which he became president in 1879, and he was a trustee of the Boston Public Library from 1885 to 1888. The degree of AM was conferred on him by Harvard and Williams in 1867.

About 1868 he was one of the patentees of a machine for making sugar cubes, and in 1882 he patented one for making hyposulphite of soda. His "Ancestral Tablets" (Boston, 1868) was an invention for genealogists, being a set of pages cut and arranged to admit the insertion of a pedigree in a condensed form.

He was a founder of the Historical Magazine in 1857, of the Prince Society in 1858, and of the Boston Antiquarian Society in 1879, to which the Bostonian Society succeeded. Whitmore was an editor of the New England Historical and Genealogical Register, in which many of his papers first appeared, and The Heraldic Journal, which he established in 1863.

== Personal life ==
He married Fanny Therese Walling Maynard on June 11, 1884, and they had one son.

== Death ==
Whitmore died in Boston on June 14, 1900, aged 63.

=== Legacy ===
A gallery in Boston's Old State House is named in Whitmore's honor.

== Publications ==
He has edited:

- The Poetical Works of Winthrop Mackworth Praed (New York, 1860)
- The Hutchinson Papers, with William Appleton (2 vols., Boston, 1865), for the Prince Society
- Dunton's Letters (1867), for the Prince Society
- Andros Tracts (3 vols., 1868-'74), for the Prince Society
- A Record of the Descendants of Captain John Ayres of Brookfield, Mass (1870, Boston, T.R. Marvin & Son, 88 Pages)
- Records of the Boston Record Commission, which he established in 1875 (20+ vols.)
- Sewall's Diary, co-editor, writing all the local notes (Boston, 1875-'82)

He prepared the a codification of laws for adoption, his codification being passed by the legislature almost unchanged in 1876. Other political works:

- Revision of the City Ordinances, with Henry W. Putnam (1882)
- Report on the State Seal, accepted by the legislature in 1885

He reprinted in facsimile the "Laws of Massachusetts of 1672" (Boston, 1887). Whitmore contributed to various magazines, native and foreign, and was the author of many genealogies, the most important of which are the families of Temple, Lane, Norton, Winthrop, Hutchinson, Usher, Ayres, Payne, Whitmore, Lee, Dalton, and Wilcox. Other works:

- Handbook of American Genealogy (Albany, 1862), reprinted with additions as The American Genealogist (1868)
- The Cavalier Dismounted, an essay (Salem, 1864)
- Elements of Heraldry (Boston, 1866)
- Massachusetts Civil List, 1636-1774 (Albany, 1870)
- Copp's Hill Epitaphs (Albany, 1878)
- History of the Old State-House, issued by the city of Boston (1882)
- Life of Abel Brown, the engraver (Boston, 1884)
