= Francis Samuel Drake (historian) =

American historian (1828–1885)

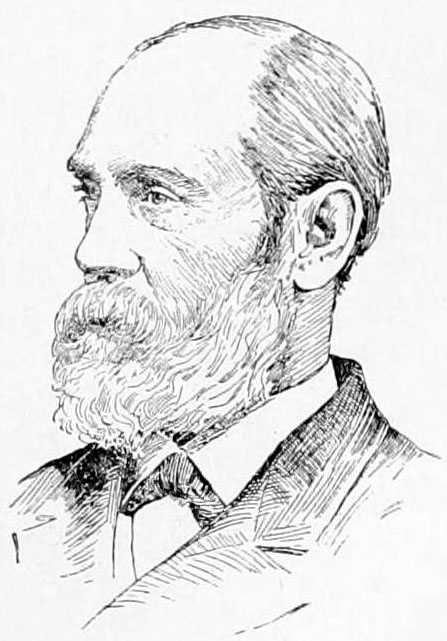
- Born: February 22, 1828; Northwood, New Hampshire
- Died: February 22, 1885 (aged 57); Washington, D.C.
- Occupations: Bookseller; biographer; historian

Signature
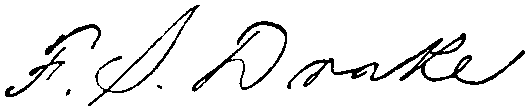

Francis Samuel Drake (February 22, 1828 – February 22, 1885) was an American historian. His 1872 Dictionary of American Biography, containing 10,000 biographical sketches, was expanded after his death as Appletons' Cyclopædia of American Biography.

== Biography ==
Drake was born in Northwood, New Hampshire, the son of antiquarian and historian Samuel Gardner Drake. He was educated in the public schools of Boston. After aiding his father in his Boston book store, he entered a counting house in Boston. In 1862, he went to Leavenworth, Kansas, and engaged in bookselling there until 1867, when he returned to Boston. Drake inherited his father's taste for historical work, and was an eager collector long before he wrote anything for publication.

== Writing ==
Drake spent 20 years collecting material for his Dictionary of American Biography and wrote it by himself. The first edition contains 10,000 biographies and was published by Osgood in 1872. With his latest corrections and all the materials that he had gathered for a new edition—before his 1885 death in Washington D.C.—it was incorporated in Appletons' Cyclopædia of American Biography.

He edited Henry Schoolcraft's History of the Indians, and contributed articles on Brighton, Watertown, and Roxbury to the Justin Winsor's Memorial History of Boston (1880–82).

== Published books ==
- Dictionary of American Biography (Boston: James R. Osgood, 1872)
- Memorial of the Massachusetts Society of the Cincinnati (1873)
- Life of Gen. Henry Knox (1873) (See Henry Knox.)
- The Town of Roxbury (1878) (See Roxbury, Boston.)
- Tea-Leaves (1884)
- Indian History for Young Folks (1885)

Full title of the Dictionary in its 1872 first edition:
Dictionary of American Biography, including Men of the Time; containing nearly ten thousand notices of persons of both sexes, of native and foreign birth, who have been remarkable, or prominently connected with the Arts, Sciences, Literature, Politics, or History, of the American Continent. Giving also the pronunciation of many of the foreign and peculiar American names, a key to the assumed names of writers, and a Supplement.
