= Duty drawback =

Refund of duties, taxes and fees collected upon the importation of goods

Duty drawback is the refund of duties, certain taxes, and certain fees collected upon the importation of merchandise into the United States, when such merchandise, or a valid substitute, is exported, destroyed, or used to manufacture a product which is exported or destroyed. Claimants may be the importer, exporter, or an intermediate party within the drawback transaction. Duty drawback is the oldest trade program in the United States and was codified in 1789.

Claimants can recover the following duties, taxes and fees paid on the imported merchandise:

- Regular duties paid on an entry
- Voluntary tenders of duties
- Marking duties
- Certain excise taxes (Includes Internal Revenue Tax (IRT))
- Harbor maintenance fees
- Merchandise processing fees
- Duties tendered as a result of a 19 U.S.C. 1592(d) duty demand
- Duties tendered in a prior disclosure per 19 C.F.R. 162.74
- Trade Remedy duties collected under sections 201 and 301 of the Trade Act of 1974 (P.L. 93-618)
- Other miscellaneous fees as authorized by U.S. Customs and Border Protection (CBP)

== Most common types of US drawback ==
- Direct Identification Manufacturing Drawback (19 U.S.C. 1313(a)): Upon the exportation or destruction of articles manufactured or produced in the US with the use of imported merchandise, provided that the manufactured articles have not been used prior to exportation or destruction, drawback of 99% of the duty, taxes and fees paid upon importation may be claimed. If the manufactured articles will be destroyed, claimants must notify CBP of the destruction by filing CBP Form 7553 with CBP Officers at the port of examination.
- Substitution Manufacturing Drawback (19 U.S.C. 1313(b)): If imported duty-paid merchandise, or merchandise classifiable under the same 8-digit HTS subheading number as such imported merchandise, is used in the manufacture or production of articles in the US, upon exportation or destruction of the manufactured articles, notwithstanding the fact that none of the imported merchandise may actually have been used in the manufacture or production of the exported or destroyed articles, and only if the manufactured articles have not been used prior to such exportation or destruction, drawback of 99% of the duty, taxes and fees on the value of the imported or substituted merchandise, whichever is less, may be claimed. If the manufactured articles will be destroyed, claimants must notify CBP of the destruction by filing CBP Form 7553 with CBP Officers at the port of examination.
- Merchandise not Conforming to Sample or Specifications (19 U.S.C. 1313(c)): If merchandise is exported or destroyed because it does not conform with samples or specifications, has been shipped without the consent of the consignee, determined to be defective as of the time of importation, or imported and sold at retail and returned, then 99% of the duties which were paid on the merchandise may be recovered as drawback. Prior to the export or destruction of the imported merchandise, claimants must notify CBP of the export or destruction by filing CBP Form 7553 with CBP Officers at the port of examination, unless specifically exempted from this requirement.
- Retail Returns under 19 U.S.C. 1313(c). Claimants must either file as substitution (1 year between the designated import and the export/exportation date) or direct identification (5 years between the import date and the export/destruction date). Direct identification claims may use an inventory methodology to identify the merchandise.
- Unused Direct Identification Drawback (19 U.S.C. 1313(j)(1)): If imported merchandise is unused and exported or destroyed under Customs supervision, 99% of the duties, taxes and/or fees paid on the merchandise by reason of importation may be recovered as drawback. Prior to the export or destruction of the imported merchandise, claimants must notify CBP of the export or destruction by filing CBP Form 7553 with CBP Officers at the port of examination, unless specifically exempted from this requirement.
- Substitution Unused Merchandise Drawback (19 U.S.C. 1313(j)(2)): If merchandise that is classifiable under the same 8-digit HTS subheading number as the imported merchandise, provided the HTS description of the imported merchandise is not "other," is exported or destroyed without being used in the United States, drawback of 99% of the duty, taxes and fees on the value of the imported or substituted merchandise, whichever is less, may be claimed. If the 8-digit HTS description of the imported merchandise is "other," drawback may be authorized if the substituted merchandise is classifiable under the same 10-digit HTS subheading number as the imported merchandise provided the 10-digit HTS description of the imported merchandise is not "other." Drawback under § 1313(j)(2) is limited when exporting to Canada and Mexico. Prior to the export or destruction of the merchandise, claimants must notify CBP of the export or destruction by filing CBP Form 7553 with CBP Officers at the port of examination, unless specifically exempted from this requirement.

== General drawback claim flow for unused and manufacturing claims ==
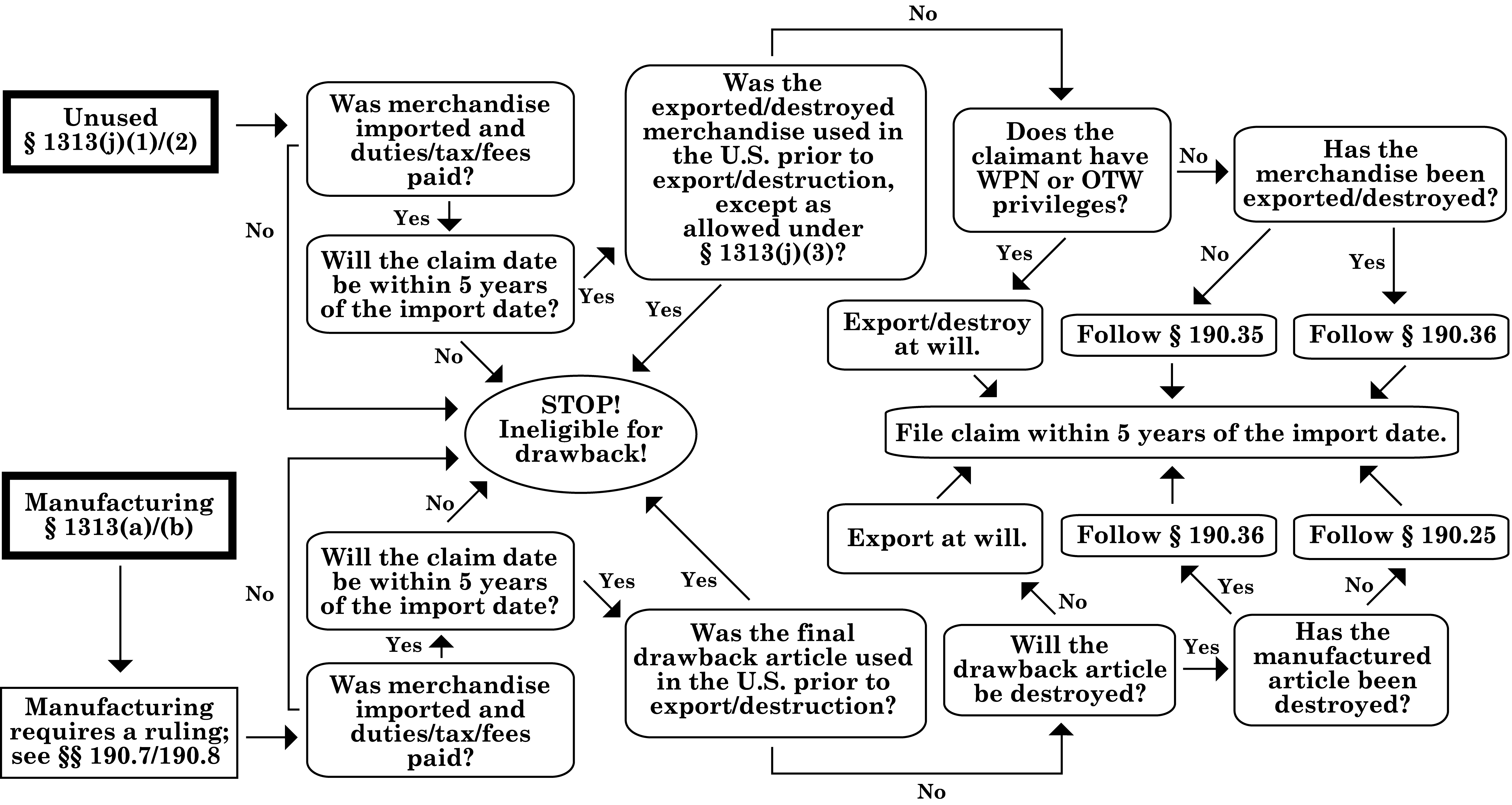
A flowchart representing the claim process for unused and manufacturing drawback claims

== Drawback claim filing instructions ==
Claims are filed in accordance with the requirements in 19 C.F.R. Part 190 and the generalized instructions in the ACE Business Rules and Process Document found on CBP.gov.

Claims filed under 19 U.S.C. 1313(d) must be filed within 3 years from the date of export of the manufactured article. NAFTA claims are subject to the time frames in 19 C.F.R. Part 181. All other claims must be filed within 5 years from the date of import of the imported merchandise.

All claims must be filed electronically with CBP through the Automated Broker Interface (ABI). Paper claims are not accepted, and electronic claims may not be submitted through an ACE portal account. Claimants are required to electronically transmit the claim data defined in the drawback CATAIR, which can be found on CBP.gov.

Claimants may file a claim in one of three ways:

1. Utilize the services of a licensed Customs broker. Brokers will handle all aspects of claim filing, including constructing and electronically transmitting the claim to CBP. Claimants may use any U.S. licensed customs broker regardless of location or whether or not the broker was involved in the import or export transaction(s)
2. Use a service provider. Service providers will transmit a claim constructed by the claimant
3. Self-file: claimants must construct the claim, purchase the filing software, and establish an ABI communications link with CBP

Service providers, and software vendors can be found on CBP.gov.

Upon acceptance by CBP, the claim will be automatically routed to a CBP Center of Excellence and Expertise (CEE) for processing according to the claimant's importer number included within the claim. CEE drawback offices are located at Newark/New York, Houston, Chicago, Detroit, and San Francisco.

Privileges. CBP allows three “privileges” that enhance drawback claim processing:

- Accelerated payment (AP): an estimated payment of drawback (19 C.F.R. 190.92)
- Waiver of the requirement to file CBP Form 7553 for prospective exports (WPN) (19 C.F.R. 190.91)
- Waiver of the requirement to file CBP Form 7553 for past exports (OTW) (19 C.F.R. 190.36)

Claimants must submit an application for a privilege which must be approved by a drawback office before a privilege can be invoked on a claim. Claimants may use either the generic privilege application sample found on CBP.gov or submit an application in letter format that includes the data elements defined in the specific regulation. Privilege applications should be emailed to the drawback office that will process the claim if known; else email to the closest drawback office and it will be routed by CBP accordingly.

Manufacturing Rulings for Claims Filed Under 19 U.S.C. 1313(a)/(b). Claimants who use imported merchandise, or a valid substitute, to manufacture a drawback article for export/destruction must have a ruling prior to being approved for a drawback payment. CBP has pre-approved several common manufacturing processes as “general” rulings (found in Appendix A of 19 C.F.R. 190) that any claimant may use provided their manufacturing process falls within the manufacturing process described therein. If a claimant's manufacturing process does not meet the requirements of a general ruling, they must request a specific ruling from CBP Headquarters per 19 C.F.R. 190.8.

General ruling applications should be emailed to the drawback office that will process the claim if known; else email to the closest drawback office and it will be routed by CBP accordingly. Specific ruling applications should be emailed to the drawback section of Regulations and Rulings.

Claimants may file a drawback claim utilizing provisional ruling number 99-99999-999 while waiting for a ruling approval, but in such cases, CBP will not pay drawback or accelerated payment until a claimant's ruling request has been approved.

Notice of Intent to Export or Destroy (NOI). Per 19 C.F.R. 190.35, exporters are required to notify CBP prior to the export of unused or rejected merchandise subject to drawback. Notification is made by submitting CBP Form 7553 to the CBP office of examination, which is usually the port of export. Once the requirements of the NOI have been met, the merchandise may be exported, and the executed Form 7553 is included with the drawback claim. The requirements in 19 C.F.R. 190.35 may be waived per the conditions outlined in 19 C.F.R. 190.36 or 19 C.F.R. 190.91.

For merchandise that will be destroyed, an NOI must be submitted to CBP prior to destruction per the requirements in 19 C.F.R. 190.71. Notification is made by submitting CBP Form 7553 to the CBP office of examination, which is usually the port where the destruction will occur. Should CBP decline to witness a destruction, the merchandise must be destroyed by a disinterested third party and the third party must provide the proof of destruction.

The executed NOI (the process is complete, and the NOI has been signed by the CBP Officer) is uploaded into the Document Image System (DIS) at the time of claim filing.

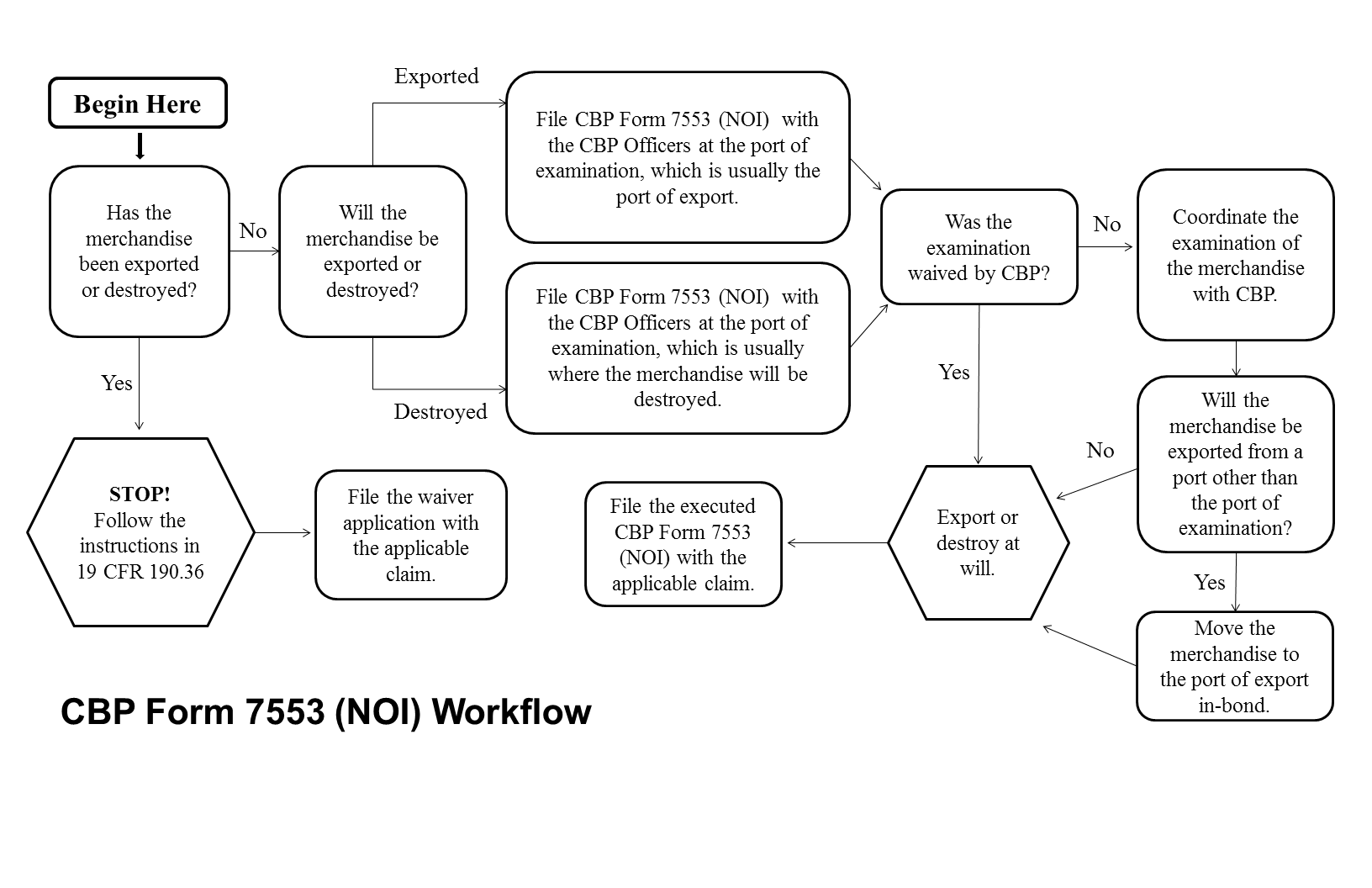
A simple flowchart representing the NOI process flow

Bonding. A drawback claim does not require a bond unless the claimant has been approved for AP privileges and is requesting AP on the claim. In such cases, a 1A drawback bond must be included with the claim in an amount not less than the AP. All bonds must be filed in eBond .

Payment. Unless approved for AP, an approved drawback payment will usually be issued between one and three years after the claim date. The only predictable payment is AP, and approved AP will usually occur within three weeks of the AP request acceptance date.

Technical Assistance. Filing error status codes may be researched in the Drawback Error Dictionary found on CBP.gov. CBP has personnel dedicated to assisting filers successfully transmit their claims: claimants may contact an ABI rep by sending an email to clientrepoutreach@cbp.dhs.gov.

== North American Free Trade Agreement (NAFTA) drawback ==
Drawback on merchandise exported to Canada or Mexico subject to NAFTA can be claimed per the guidance in 19 C.F.R. 181. Unused merchandise that is exported in the same condition as imported may be filed under 19 U.S.C. 1313(j)(1) and 19 C.F.R. 190. Claims under NAFTA may be filed on merchandise entered into the U.S. on or before June 30, 2020. Claims under 19 U.S.C. 1313(c) retail returns substitution may not be filed under NAFTA; retail returns direct identification are allowed.

== United States–Mexico–Canada Agreement (USMCA) drawback ==
Drawback on merchandise exported to Canada or Mexico subject to USMCA can be claimed per the guidance in 19 C.F.R. 182. Unused merchandise that is exported in the same condition as imported may be filed under 19 U.S.C. 1313(j)(1) and 19 C.F.R. 190. Claims under USMCA may be filed on merchandise entered into the U.S. on or after July 1, 2020.

== United States–Chile Free Trade Agreement drawback ==
Exports to Chile are no longer eligible for drawback unless filed under 19 U.S.C. 1313(j)(1) and the merchandise has not changed in condition. Additional information can be found on CBP.gov.

== Public Law 114–125 ==
On February 24, 2015, drawback law was updated via “The Trade Facilitation and Trade Enforcement Act of 2015” (TFTEA) which modernized the drawback statutes and regulations. The final rule was published in the Federal Register on December 18, 2018.
