= Barnstable's Olde Colonial Courthouse =

Coordinates: 41.704254°N 70.308146°W

- Olde Colonial Courthouse
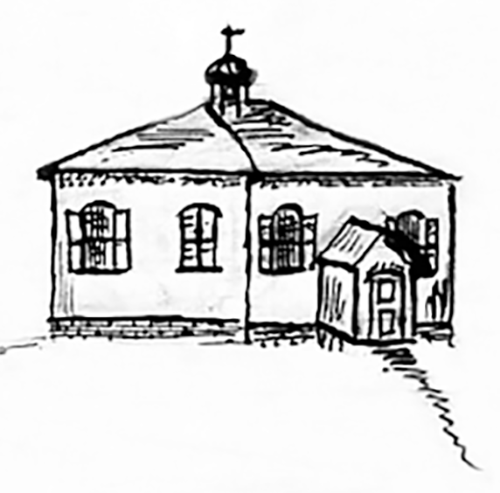
- c. 1825
- Location: 3046 Main St, Barnstable, MA 02630
- Built: 1763
- Part of: Old King's Highway Historic District

Barnstable's Olde Colonial Courthouse, at 3046 Main St. (Rt. 6A) in Barnstable, MA, was constructed c.1763, to replace Barnstable County's first courthouse nearby. Barnstable County comprises all of Cape Cod, MA

The courthouse was a wood-frame structure in the Georgian style typical of small government buildings of the era, roughly 30' by 40', facing the roadway, with a brick and stone foundation, round-top windows, cupola belfry and a small, enclosed entry porch. The building housed only the courtroom. Juries deliberated in a nearby tavern.

Court records were kept in a separate wood-frame building to the east, the County House, which burned to the ground in 1827, with the loss of nearly all accumulated court records.

Col. James Otis was presiding judge here from 1764 until 1776. Otis was the father of James Otis Jr., an early opponent of British policy. John Adams argued at least one case in this courthouse, on May 16, 1767.

The courthouse was the site of a mass protest on Sept. 27, 1774, after Britain abrogated Massachusetts Bay's 1691 charter — one of a series of Coercive Acts intended to punish the colonists for the Boston Tea Party the previous year.

As a result of the protest, all Barnstable county officials agreed to ignore Parliament's new rules, effectively freeing Cape Cod of British control.

The protest was similar to actions mounted at county courthouses across Massachusetts the summer and autumn of 1774. By the end of that year, all of Massachusetts was free of British control except for Boston, where British forces were stationed. The Royal Governor, Gen. Thomas Gage, was unable to retake control of the colony for lack of an adequate military presence. His major effort the next spring to secure military stores in Concord, MA, resulted in the Battle of Lexington and Concord, the first engagement in what became the Revolutionary War.

The Barnstable building is one of only two remaining Massachusetts colonial-era courthouses where those 1774 protests were mounted.

The county dedicated a new courthouse in 1834, consolidating all court functions in a large, granite structure closer to the present center of Barnstable Village.

The old courthouse was remodeled in 1842 to serve as a home for the newly formed Third Barnstable Baptist Church. After the church was disbanded in 1972, the building was purchased by Tales of Cape Cod, a nonprofit volunteer group committed to preserving the Cape's history.

The building is a contributing property of both the federal and Barnstable town Old King's Highway Historic District.
