= Samuel White (Massachusetts politician) =

American politician (1710–1769)

Member of the Governors Council for the Province of Massachusetts Bay
- In office 1767–1769

Speaker of the Massachusetts House of Representatives
- In office May 30, 1759, May 25, 1764, May 29, 1765 – May 28, 1760, June 1, 1764, May 28, 1766,
- Preceded by: Thomas Hubbard; Timothy Ruggles; Thomas Clap
- Succeeded by: James Otis Sr. Thomas Clap; James Otis Jr.

Member of the Massachusetts House of Representatives for Taunton, Bristol County, Massachusetts
- In office 1749, 1756, 1764 – 1753, 1759, 1765

Personal details
- Born: April 2, 1710 Weymouth, Massachusetts Bay Colony
- Died: March 20, 1769
- Spouse(s): Prudence Williams (m. November 1735) d. June 8th, 1808 at age 98 in Norton, Massachusetts
- Education: Harvard 1731
- Occupation: Lawyer

Samuel White (April 2, 1710 – March 20, 1769) was a prominent lawyer in the Province of Massachusetts Bay who served several terms as Speaker of the Massachusetts House of Representatives.

== Biography ==
White was born in Weymouth, Massachusetts to Samuel and Ann (Bingley) White, .

=== Marriage ===
In November 1735 White married Prudence Williams daughter of Samuel Williams of Taunton, Massachusetts.

== Notes ==
Political offices
Preceded by Thomas Hubbard	Speaker of the Massachusetts House of Representatives; May 30, 1759–May 28, 1760	Succeeded by James Otis Sr.
Preceded by Timothy Ruggles	Speaker of the Massachusetts House of Representatives; May 25, 1764-June 1, 1764	Succeeded by Thomas Clap
Preceded by Thomas Clap	Speaker of the Massachusetts House of Representatives; May 29, 1765-May 28, 1766	Succeeded by James Otis Jr.
Preceded by	Massachusetts State Representative for Taunton, Bristol County, Massachusetts; 1749–1753	Succeeded by
Preceded by	Massachusetts State Representative for Taunton, Bristol County, Massachusetts; 1756–1759	Succeeded by
Preceded by	Massachusetts State Representative for Taunton, Bristol County, Massachusetts; 1764–1765	Succeeded by
