= Oliver Partridge =

American military commander & politician

Oliver Partridge (1712-1792) was a military commander, politician and early American patriot. He represented Massachusetts at the Albany Congress of 1754, and at the Stamp Act Congress of 1765 where he supported resistance to the British Stamp Act in the events leading up to the American Revolution.

== Life ==
=== Family ===
Partridge was born in Hatfield, Massachusetts to a family of English colonial officers and magistrates. He was a member of the Dudley-Winthrop Family, known for their involvement in colonial politics. He was a great-grandson of Massachusetts Royal Governor Simon Bradstreet and a great-great-grandson of Massachusetts Governor and Harvard founder Thomas Dudley. He was the only son of Colonel Edward Partridge, and grandson of Colonel Samuel Partridge. His grandson, Edward Partridge (1793 – 1840), was an early convert to the Latter Day Saints and the church's first Presiding Bishop. His great-grandson Edward Partridge Jr. was a member of the Utah Legislature and the Utah Constitutional Convention of 1895 which ratified Utah statehood.

=== Education and early offices ===
His commanding position among the "River Gods" or ruling families of Western New England is reflected in his ranking 2nd in his Yale class of 1730 at a time when Harvard and Yale graduates were ranked according to their family's social standing. Oliver's uncle, Col. Elisha Williams, of the influential Williams clan that later founded Williams College, was the president of Yale College during Partridge's student years there, reading law and surveying. Col. Williams went on to serve as a judge on Connecticut's Supreme Court. In 1734 Partridge married Anna Williams, the daughter of the Reverend William Williams of Weston and was appointed joint Clerk of the Court of Hampshire County. He also served as a selectman of Hatfield almost every year from 1731 to 1774 and again in 1780–81; a representative in the Massachusetts General Court 1741, 1761, and 1765–1767; and High Sheriff of Hampshire County from 1741–1743.

=== Later offices and the Revolution ===
In June 1744, at the outbreak of King George's War, he was appointed to a committee of 3 by Massachusetts Governor William Shirley (along with John Leonard and his cousin John Stoddard) to oversee the construction of a line of military forts along the western frontier of the Colonies to defend against the French. In 1754 he represented Massachusetts in the first American Congress which was convened at Albany, New York. Congress ultimately passed Benjamin Franklin’s plan for colonial union. Upon his return to Massachusetts from New York he was commissioned a Colonel and succeeded his uncle Israel Williams in command of Britain's provincial forces on the Western frontier. In 1765 with Samuel Adams, James Otis Jr. and Timothy Ruggles, he was called to represent Massachusetts at the Stamp Act Congress in New York, which resulted in the first official American opposition to British policy. Partridge signed the Declaration of Rights and Grievances to HM King George III and Parliament in which the American Congress respectfully explained their reasons for their opposition to the Act. The Declaration emphasized the colonists' rights as natural born Englishmen with all of the rights and liberties pertaining thereto including the right to trial by jury and representation in matters of taxation. The Stamp Act Congress and its Declaration of Rights eventually resulted in the Stamp Act's repeal in March 1766. It also led the colonists to focus on the idea of constitutional limitations on parliamentary authority, a concept that contributed to the American Revolution. While Partridge was in favor of Benjamin Franklin's proposed colonial union (later the United States) and publicly defended the colonists' English liberties, when he later received a letter from revolutionary leaders in Boston in 1775 as to whether he would take up arms against the mother country he replied that he feared such action might bring the country more harm than good. As matters progressed he reconciled himself to the inevitability of separation from the Britain, and resumed his legal duties as an American patriot. Such was the respect in which he was held by his countrymen that his revolutionary neighbors in the meantime did not molest his person or property during the American Revolutionary War, and in 1780 and 1781 he was again appointed selectman for Hatfield, Massachusetts. His descendants remained active in America politics. His son William Partridge supported the career of his brother-in-law the Hon. Barnabas Bidwell who clerked under his cousin the Hon. Theodore Sedgwick (former Speaker of the House in the George Washington administration) and was elected a Massachusetts Congressman, Senator, Attorney General and U.S. Congressman and administration spokesman for President Thomas Jefferson. Oliver Partridge's great granddaughter Emily Partridge married Utah Governor Brigham Young of the Richards-Young family and his great great grandson Edward Partridge Jr. was a Utah representative and delegate to the Utah Constitutional Convention of 1895.

=== Epitaph ===
He died at Hadley. His epitaph states that "His usefulness in church and state was early known to men; Blest with an active life, till late, and happy in his end."
