= Bathsheba Spooner =

American woman executed for murder (1746–1778)

Bathsheba Ruggles Spooner
- Born: February 15, 1746; Sandwich, Province of Massachusetts Bay
- Died: July 2, 1778 (aged 32); Worcester, Massachusetts, U.S.
- Spouse: Joshua Spooner
- Parent(s): Timothy Ruggles, father Bathsheba Ruggles (Bourne), mother
- Status: Executed
- Convictions: Inciting, abetting and procuring the manner and form of murder
- Penalty: Death by hanging

Bathsheba Ruggles Spooner (February 15, 1746 – July 2, 1778) was the first woman in American history to be executed following the Declaration of Independence.

The daughter of prominent Loyalist brigadier general and jurist Timothy Ruggles, Bathsheba Ruggles had an arranged marriage to wealthy farmer Joshua Spooner. After becoming pregnant by her lover, 16-year-old Continental Army soldier Ezra Ross, she enlisted the assistance of Ross and two others to murder her husband. On the night of March 1, 1778, Spooner was beaten to death and his body deposited in a well. Bathsheba and the three conspirators were soon arrested, tried, and convicted of Spooner's murder and sentenced to death.

Bathsheba petitioned to have her execution delayed because of her pregnancy, which was first denied and then supported by some members of a group charged with examining her to verify the pregnancy. After the four were executed, a postmortem examination revealed that she was five months pregnant. Historians have pointed out that the trial and execution may have been hastened by anti-Loyalist sentiment.

== Background ==
Bathsheba Ruggles Spooner was the daughter of Brig. Gen. Timothy Ruggles, a lawyer who had served as chief justice of the Court of Common Pleas in Worcester, Massachusetts, from 1762 to 1764. Timothy Ruggles refused to sign the Stamp Act protest when serving as Massachusetts representative to the Stamp Act Congress in 1765. An avowed Loyalist who threatened to raise an army to protect his and other Loyalist farms against attacks by Patriot forces, Ruggles joined forces with the British Army in Boston in 1775.

Bathsheba Ruggles and Joshua Spooner published their intention to marry in Hardwick, Massachusetts on January 15, 1766. He was a well-to-do Brookfield farmer, the son of a wealthy Boston merchant. The Spooners lived in relative affluence in a two-story house in Brookfield, and had four children between 1767 and 1775. Spooner was later described as an abusive man for whom his wife developed "an utter aversion."

== Plotting murder ==
In the spring of 1777, 16-year-old Ezra Ross, a soldier in the Continental Army, fell ill en route to his home in Linebrook, a village in Ipswich. Bathsheba nursed him back to health. On his travels to and from army service, Ross visited the Spooner home in July and December 1777. On the latter occasion he stayed into the new year, traveled with Spooner on business trips and had an affair with Bathsheba. She became pregnant mid-January and began urging Ross to kill her husband. In February 1778, Ross accompanied Spooner on an extended trip to Princeton, bringing along a bottle of nitric acid given to him by Bathsheba with the aim of poisoning Spooner. Ross backed out of the plan and returned directly to his Linebrook home.

While Ross and Spooner were in Princeton, Bathsheba invited two runaway British soldiers—escaped prisoners of war Pvt. Williams Brooks and Sgt. James Buchanan—to stay at the Spooner home and discussed ideas for killing her husband with them. When Spooner returned, she recruited them to assist her. She also wrote to Ross to inform him of these developments, and he returned to Brookfield on February 28. When Spooner returned home from a local tavern the following evening, Brooks committed the murder and Buchanan and Ross helped hide the body in the Spooners' well. Bathsheba distributed paper money from her husband's lockbox and articles of his clothing to the three men, who then took one of the Spooner horses to Worcester, fourteen miles away.

Brooks and Buchanan spent the remainder of the night drinking, and the next morning Brooks showed off Spooner's silver shoe buckles engraved with his initials. Once the murder was discovered, the three men were arrested in Worcester within 24 hours. When Ross was discovered hiding in the attic of a tavern, he asked for a confessor. The trio implicated Bathsheba and three of her household servants in the crime. Brooks was charged with the assault on Spooner; Buchanan and Ross with aiding and abetting in the murder; and Bathsheba with inciting, abetting and procuring the manner and form of the murder. All were arraigned and pleaded not guilty.

== Trial and execution ==
Robert Treat Paine, later the first Attorney General of Massachusetts, prosecuted the case. At the trial on April 24, 1778, the household servants testified for the prosecution. Levi Lincoln, later U.S. Attorney General under President Thomas Jefferson, defended the accused. Brooks and Buchanan had no defense to offer, having signed lengthy confessions. Though Ross had signed a similar confession, Lincoln argued that he had no intention of harming the deceased, was not aware of the plan until a few hours before the murder, had not assisted in the murder and pretended to support it to maintain his affair with Bathsheba. He argued that Bathsheba had a "disordered mind," that her actions were irrational as evidenced by the lack of a getaway plan.

All four defendants were found guilty the next day and sentenced to death, with the executions set for June 4, 1778. Bathsheba petitioned for a postponement, citing her pregnancy, based on common law principle that protected the life of a fetus if it had quickened. Bathsheba was examined by a panel of twelve women and two male midwives. All swore that she was not "quick with child." When Bathsheba and her confessor, the Rev. Thaddeus Maccarty, protested the report, four of the examiners joined by another midwife and Spooner's brother-in-law, Dr. John Green, conducted a second examination and supported the claim of pregnancy. The court did not accept those findings and Bathsheba was hanged alongside Ross, Brooks and Buchanan on July 2 in Worcester's Washington Square before a crowd of 5,000 spectators. A post-mortem examination, performed at Bathsheba's request, showed that she was pregnant with "a perfect male fetus of the growth of five months."

Bathsheba's body was claimed by her sister, Mary Ruggles Green, wife of Dr. John Green. She was buried in an unmarked grave on the Green Estate, which today is the site of Green Hill Park in Worcester.

== Assessments ==
Shortly after the executions, on July 5, Rev. Ebenezer Parkman, the minister of the nearby town of Westborough, delivered a sermon entitled The Adultress Shall Hunt for the Precious Life in which he said:

So keep thee from the Evil woman, from the flattery of the tongue of a strange woman. Neither let her take thee with her eyelids. There are a thousand dangers, that poor young wretches are in by reason of the snares & traps which are everywhere laid ... particularly the poor beardless youth not quite 18.

One historian says the judgment of the first panel that examined Spooner–"they refused to acknowledge what must have been obvious"–and blames "vindictiveness". Others question the motivation of the Massachusetts Executive Council. Some suggest Bathsheba was executed because the community opposed her father's Loyalist stance. John Avery Jr., the deputy secretary and leader of the Massachusetts Executive Council, who signed Bathsheba's death warrant, belonged to a group of Patriots called the Loyal Nine, who formed the innermost circle of the Sons of Liberty and was a step-brother of the murder victim.

== In popular culture ==
The CBS radio program Crime Classics dramatized the case in an episode entitled "The Crime of Bathsheba Spooner" that aired on June 15, 1953. Bathsheba Spooner's case was also featured in Season 11, Episode 10 of Deadly Women in 2017.

The band American Murder Song’s album The Seven Deadly Sinners featured a song recounting Spooner’s crime, called “Bathsheba Spooner (Lust)”

== See also ==
- List of people executed in Massachusetts
