= Mill Way Historic District =

Historic district in Massachusetts, United States

- U.S. National Register of Historic Places
- U.S. Historic district
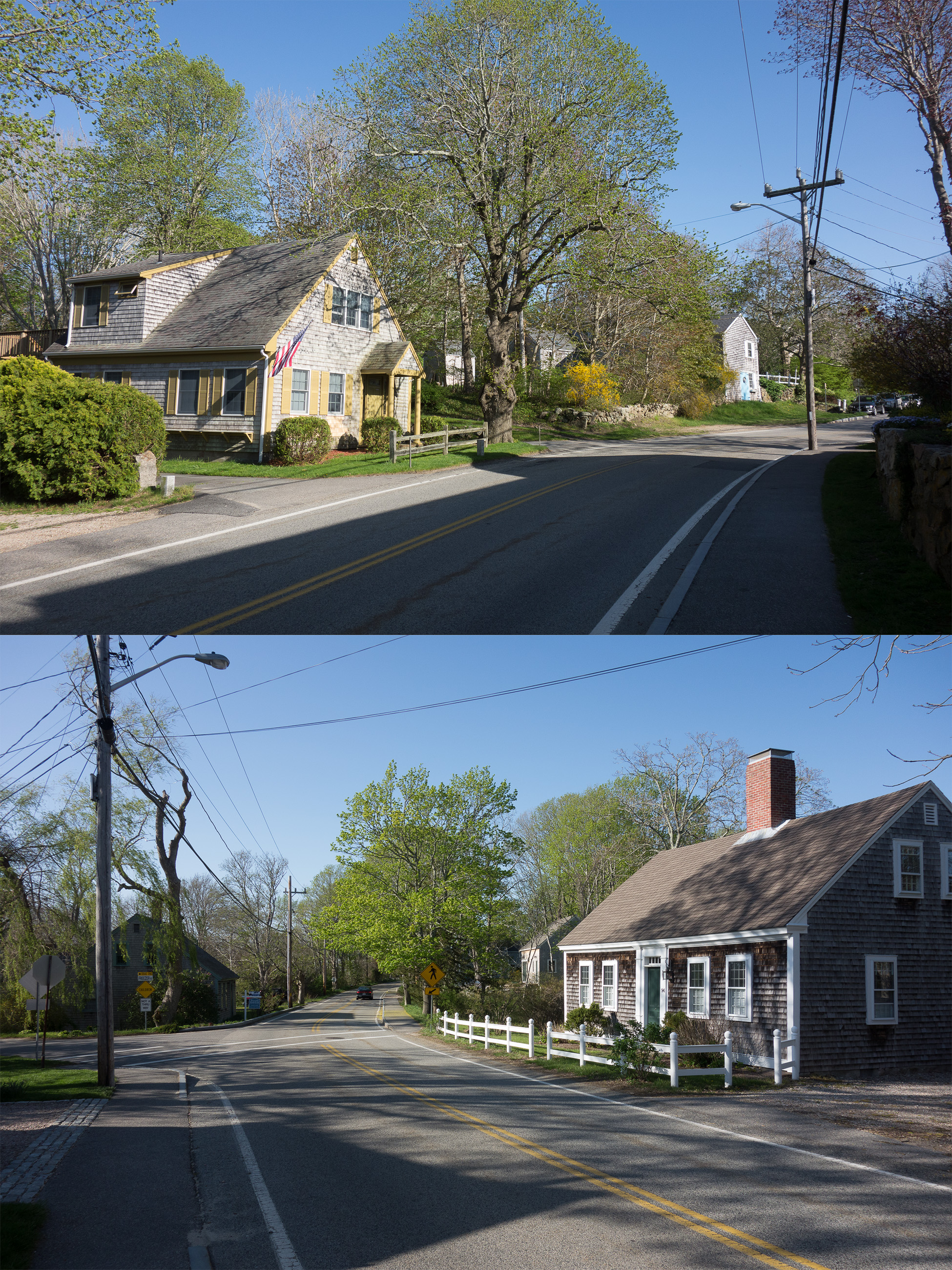
- Two houses along Mill Way.

- Location within Cape Cod Location within Massachusetts Location within the United States
- Location: Barnstable, Massachusetts
- Coordinates: 41°42′12″N 70°18′1″W
- Built: 1750
- Architectural style: Colonial Revival, Greek Revival, Federal
- MPS: Barnstable MRA
- NRHP reference No.: 87000271
- Added to NRHP: November 10, 1987

The Mill Way Historic District encompasses a residential area significant in the development of the maritime industry in Barnstable Village, Massachusetts. It includes thirteen houses, ten on Mill Way and three on adjacent Freezer Road, just north of the Old King's Highway. The district was listed on the National Register of Historic Places in 1987.

Mill Way was the major route between the center of Barnstable and its port area from its very earliest days. Agriculture dominated the village until later in the 18th century, with a grist mill located to make use of the local tides for its power. In the 19th century the port area grew as a shipbuilding and salt production center, and some of the district's buildings reflect this heritage.

The oldest house in the district is the David Bursley House (35 Mill Way), built c. 1750; it is a 2 1/2-story four-bay house with side gable roof, and wood shingle siding. It was supposedly built as a single-story cottage, which was then raised on ship masts to build a new ground floor underneath. The 1797 Maraspin House (200 Mill Way) is a fairly typical five-bay Cape cottage, whose property in 1835 included two wharves, a store, barn, mill, salthouse, and other outbuildings. The Stetson Cottage is one of the few buildings in the district with significant later alteration. Built c. 1785, the five-bay cottage was given a Colonial Revival treatment in the early 20th century, with a five-bay dormer across the front roof, and a porch with Tuscan columns below.

== See also ==
- National Register of Historic Places listings in Barnstable County, Massachusetts
- National Register of Historic Places listings in Barnstable, Massachusetts
