= Hyannis Road Historic District =

Historic district in Massachusetts, United States

- U.S. National Register of Historic Places
- U.S. Historic district
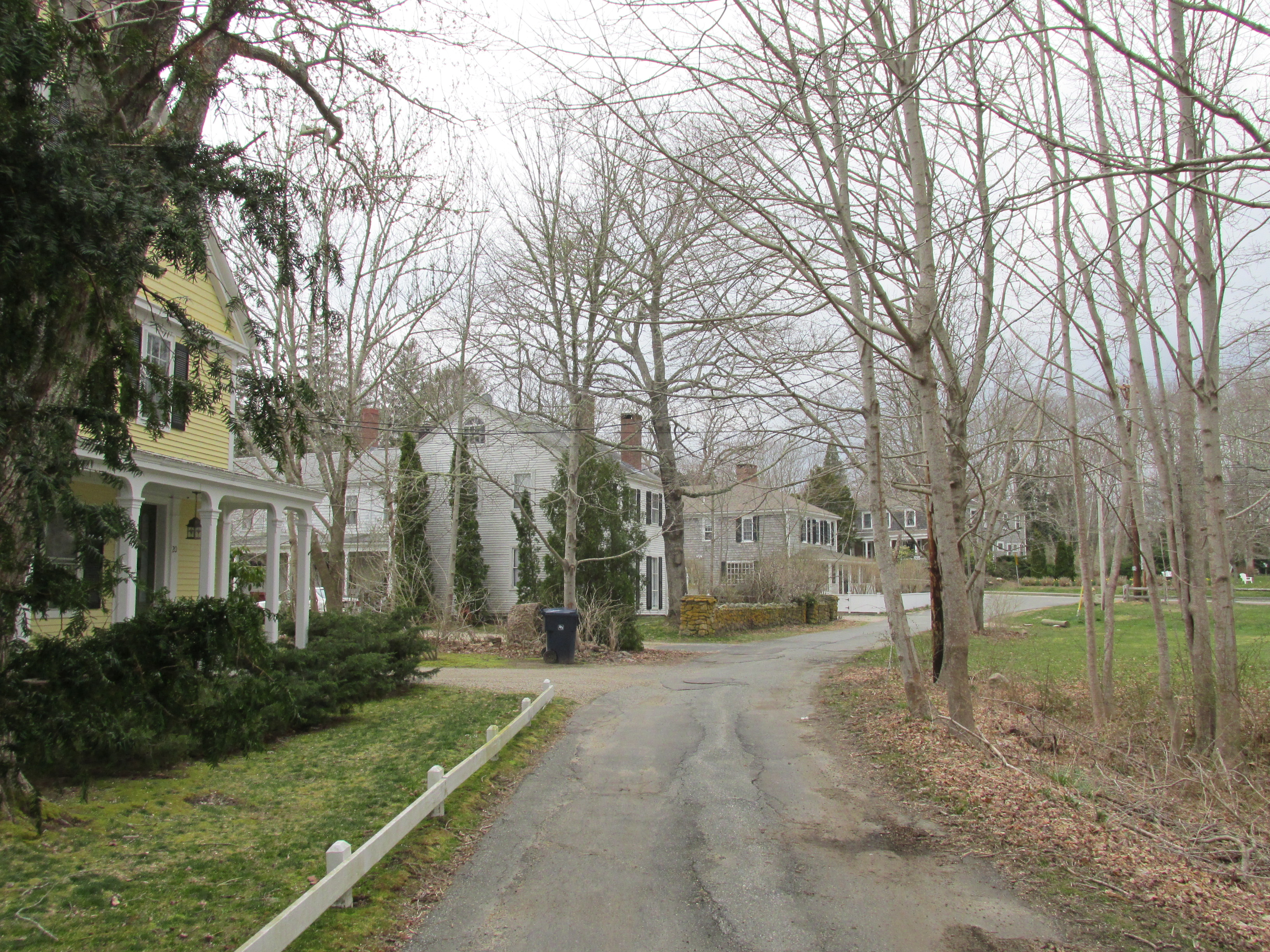
- Bow Lane

- Location within Cape Cod Location within Massachusetts Location within the United States
- Location: Barnstable, Massachusetts
- Coordinates: 41°41′23″N 70°18′4″W
- Built: 1790
- Architectural style: Greek Revival, Federal
- MPS: Barnstable MRA
- NRHP reference No.: 87000231
- Added to NRHP: March 13, 1987

The Hyannis Road Historic District is a residential historic district at the northern end of Hyannis Road in Barnstable, Massachusetts. It includes ten properties built between c. 1790 and 1855, representing southward growth from the traditional village center of Barnstable toward the growing village of Hyannis. The properties lie along Bow Lane and Hyannis Road, between the Old King's Highway and the right-of-way of the Cape Cod Railroad. The district was listed on the National Register of Historic Places in 1987.

The oldest house in the district is that of Deacon Timothy Phinney at 1776 Hyannis Road, built c. 1790. It is a rambling Federal-style house with an attached barn and an attractive Colonial Revival porch. The houses at 2 and 46 Bow Lane are also Federal in styling; the Bacon House at 46 Bow Lane is the most sophisticated of the group, with a five-bay facade and an enclosed center entry.

Most of the houses in the district are Greek Revival in style. The Marston House at 8 Bow Lane (c. 1810-23) is a fine example, with a Doric porch and full-length first floor windows on the main facade. By comparison, the adjacent Hallett House at 20 Bow Lane, built about the same time, is more vernacular in its styling. The c. 1855 Doggett House at 1709 Hyannis Road has corner pilasters and a wide frieze.

== See also ==
- National Register of Historic Places listings in Barnstable County, Massachusetts
