= Timothy Ruggles =

American politician (1711–1795)

Timothy Dwight Ruggles
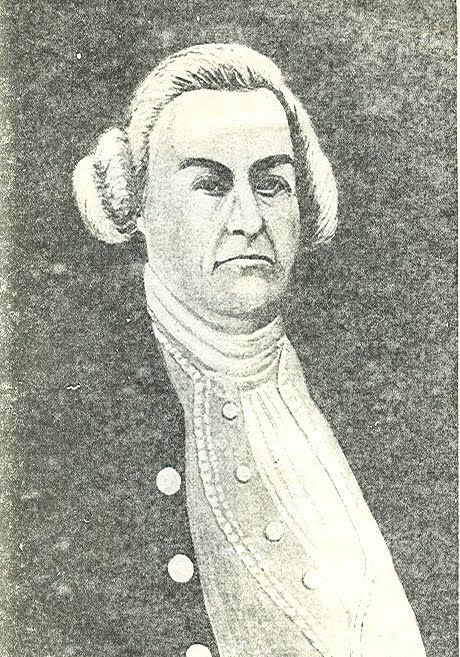

Speaker of the Massachusetts House of Representatives
- In office 1762–1764
- Preceded by: James Otis, Sr.
- Succeeded by: Samuel White

Member of the Massachusetts House of Representatives for Hardwick
- In office 1754, 1757, 1761 – 1755, 1759, 1770

Chief Justice of the Court of Common Pleas of the Province of Massachusetts Bay
- In office January 21, 1762 – 1774

Judge of the Court of Common Pleas of the Province of Massachusetts Bay
- In office April 19, 1757 – 1774

Personal details
- Born: October 20, 1711 Rochester, Massachusetts
- Died: August 4, 1795 (aged 83)
- Resting place: Wilmot, Nova Scotia
- Spouse: Bathsheba Newcomb née Bourne
- Children: Martha Ruggles (b. August 10, 1736), Timthy Ruggles (b. January 7, 1738–39), Bathsheba Ruggles (1746–1778), John Ruggles, Timothy Ruggles, Richard Ruggles., Timothy Ruggles (Nova Scotia Politician) (grandchild)
- Education: Harvard
- Occupation: Lawyer

Military service
- Allegiance: Province of Massachusetts Bay
- Branch/service: Massachusetts militia

Timothy Dwight Ruggles (October 20, 1711 – August 4, 1795) was an American colonial military leader, jurist, and politician. He was a delegate to the Stamp Act Congress of 1765 and later a Loyalist during the American Revolutionary War.

== Early life ==
Ruggles was born on October 20, 1711, to Rev. Timothy Ruggles. He was grandson of Capt. Samuel Ruggles of Roxbury and Martha Woodbridge, who was a granddaughter of Governor Thomas Dudley.

He graduated from Harvard in 1732; studied law, and established himself in practice in Rochester. In 1735, he married Mrs. Bathsheba Newcomb, widow of William Newcomb and the daughter of the Hon. Melatiah Bourne of Sandwich, Massachusetts. He was a military officer during the French and Indian War, rising to the rank of brigadier general in 1758.

== Stamp Act ==
He served multiple terms in the Massachusetts House of Representatives and was its speaker from 1762 to 1764. He participated in the October 1765 Stamp Act Congress as a representative of the Massachusetts General Court and was elected its president. Called to devise a common colonial response to the Parliament's 1765 Stamp Act, Ruggles refused to sign both the Declaration of Rights and Grievances sent by the Congress to King George III and the accompanying petitions sent to both Houses of Parliament. That made him become publicly censured by the General Court.

He subsequently became one of the leading Tories of New England. He commanded the Loyal American Association and was a Mandamus Councillor appointed by General Gage in Boston. The Loyal American Association vowed the following:

- Avoid submitting to rebellious assembly.
- Enforce obedience to the King.
- Defend one another if imperiled by unlawful assembly.
- Repel force with force.
- Use retaliation if any member or property was injured.

== Nova Scotia ==
From the outset of the American Revolutionary War in 1775, he stood with the Loyalists, left Boston soon thereafter for Nova Scotia with the British troops, and accompanied Lord Howe to Staten Island. His estates were confiscated, and he was named in the Massachusetts Banishment Act. In 1779, he received a grant of 10,000 acres (40 km^{2}) of land in Wilmot, Nova Scotia, where he settled.

== Family and later life ==
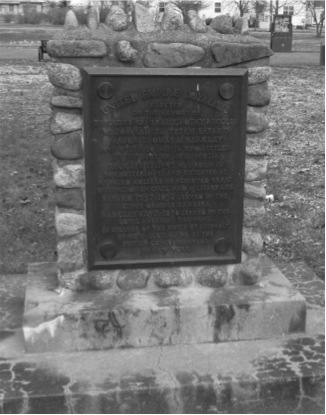
Monument to Timothy Ruggles, Middleton Park, Middleton, Nova Scotia

Ruggles left his daughter, Bathsheba Spooner, behind in Massachusetts. On July 2, 1778, she became the first woman executed in the newly independent United States of America. She was hanged while five months pregnant for the crime of plotting, with a 16-year-old Continental Army soldier with whom she was having an affair and whose child she can be presumed to have been carrying, and two British soldiers, who had deserted the British Army, after the death of her husband Joshua Spooner, who was savagely beaten and dumped in a well.

Three of Ruggles' sons, Timothy, John, and Richard, followed him into exile and settled in Annapolis County, Nova Scotia, unlike his three daughters and his wife. A grandson, also named Timothy Ruggles, was a political figure in Nova Scotia.

Ruggles was bothered by a hernia in later years and in August 1795, on the occasion of a visit by guests while he was taking them on a tour of his garden, he aggravated his poor health. Four days later, he died. He was buried on the eastward side of the Old Trinity Church of which he had been a major financial contributor in Middleton, Nova Scotia. A monument was later erected to his memory by his great-granddaughter, Eliza Bayard West.

Ruggles has been described as a vegetarian for most of his life. It was noted that "he drank nothing stronger than a small beer & was almost a vegetarian in a society in which gluttony was the one universal excess."

== See also ==
- American Revolution
- Military history of Nova Scotia

== Notes ==
Political offices
Preceded by James Otis, Sr.	Speaker of the Massachusetts House of Representatives; 1762–1764	Succeeded by Samuel White
Preceded by	Member of the Massachusetts House for Hardwick	Succeeded by
