= Barnstable County Courthouse =

- U.S. National Register of Historic Places
- U.S. Historic district – Contributing property
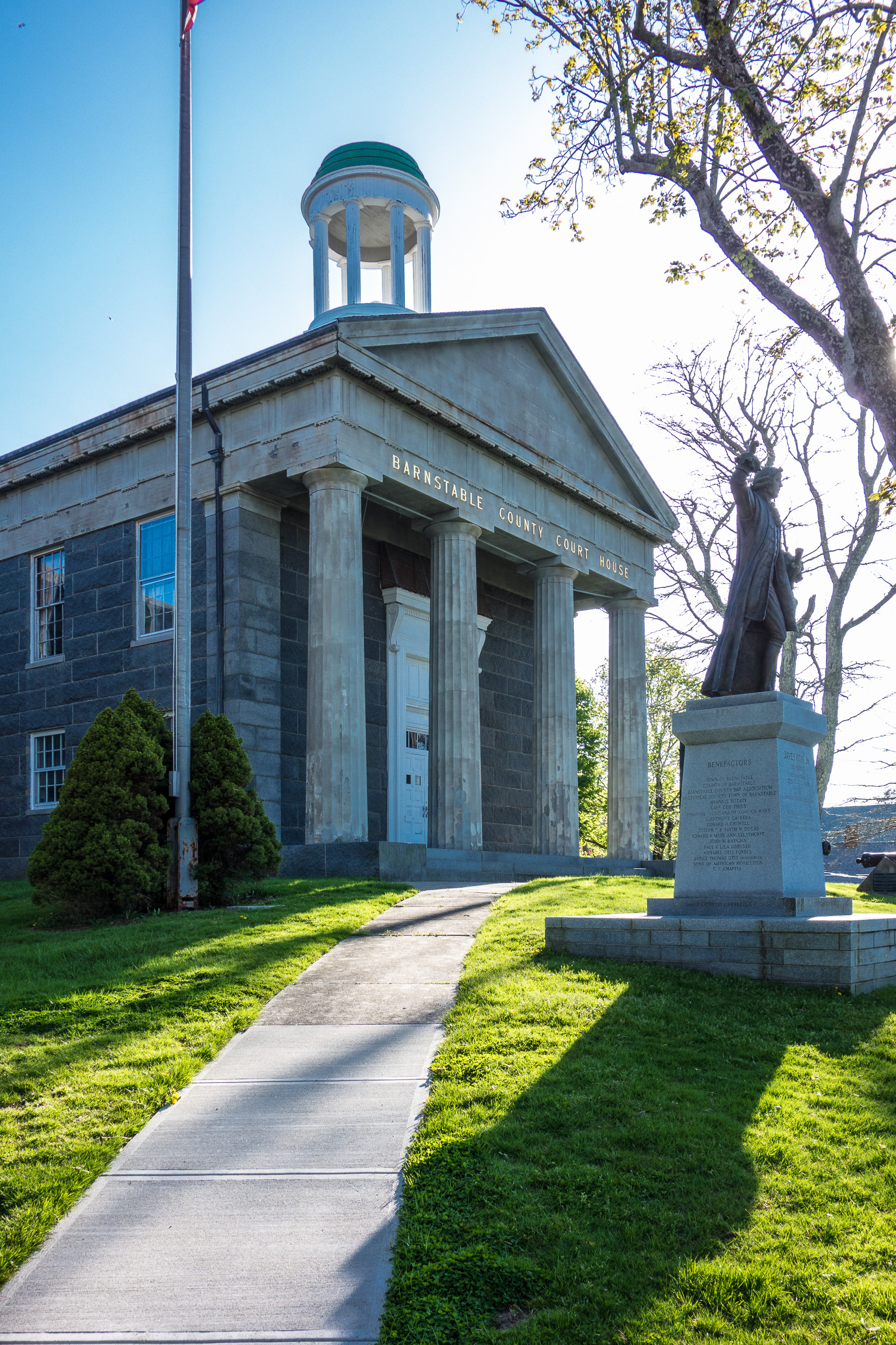
- Barnstable County Courthouse in 2014

- Location within Cape Cod Location within Massachusetts Location within the United States
- Location: 3195 Main St., Barnstable, Massachusetts
- Coordinates: 41°42′5″N 70°18′17″W
- Built: 1831
- Architect: Taylor, Jacob & Abner; Parris, Alexander
- Architectural style: Greek Revival
- Part of: Old King's Highway Historic District (ID87000314)
- NRHP reference No.: 81000104

Significant dates
- Added to NRHP: June 11, 1981
- Designated CP: March 12, 1987

The Barnstable County Courthouse is an historic courthouse at 3195 Main Street in Barnstable, Massachusetts. The two-story Greek Revival building was built in 1831 to a design by architect Alexander Parris. It is built mostly out of Quincy granite, although its front portico and fluted Doric columns are made of wood fashioned to look like stone. The building has been expanded five times between 1879 and 1971, with each addition made in a style sensitive to its original styling, and its main courtroom features original Federal styling. The building was listed on the National Register of Historic Places in 1981, and included in the Old King's Highway Historic District in 1987. The Barnstable Superior Court is located in the building.

== Description and history ==
The courthouse is set on the south side of Main Street (Massachusetts Route 6A, also known as the Old King's Highway), at the western edge of a complex housing administrative facilities of Barnstable County. The building consists of a north-facing original rectangular two-story block, behind which a series of symmetrically-arranged wings have been built. The original block, designed by the renowned architect Alexander Parris, measures 65 by 26 feet (19.8 m × 7.9 m), and is fashioned out of large blocks of Quincy granite. It is fronted by a Greek temple front, consisting of a triangular pediment supported by four fluted Doric columns. The temple front, including the columns, is fashioned out of wood finished to give the appearance of stone. The main courtroom has retained most of its original woodwork and trim, including some of its original furnishings.

The building has been repeatedly enlarged to meet increased need for facilities. All of these expansions continued the use of Quincy granite, giving the building a unified feel. In 1879 the building was enlarged to the rear, and in 1889 a single-story ell was added extending east from the rear. In 1906 the eastern ell was raised to two stories and a matching two-story ell was added to the west. These ells were extended further to the southwest and southeast with two-story additions in 1925. The building underwent a major rehabilitation in 1971, at which time a small addition was added to south, centered between the last two additions.

== Gallery ==
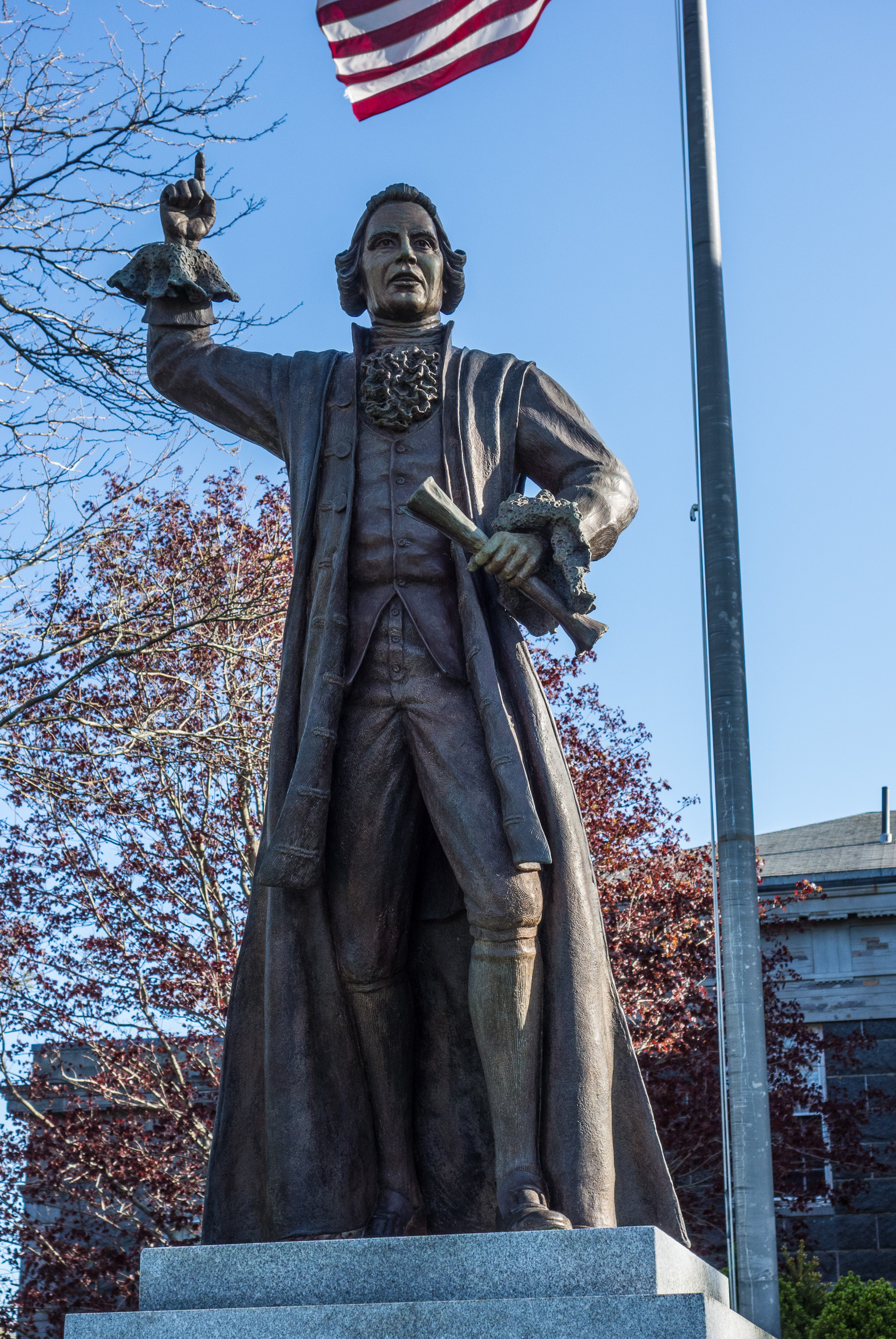
Bronze sculpture of James Otis, Jr stands to the left of the courthouse entrance

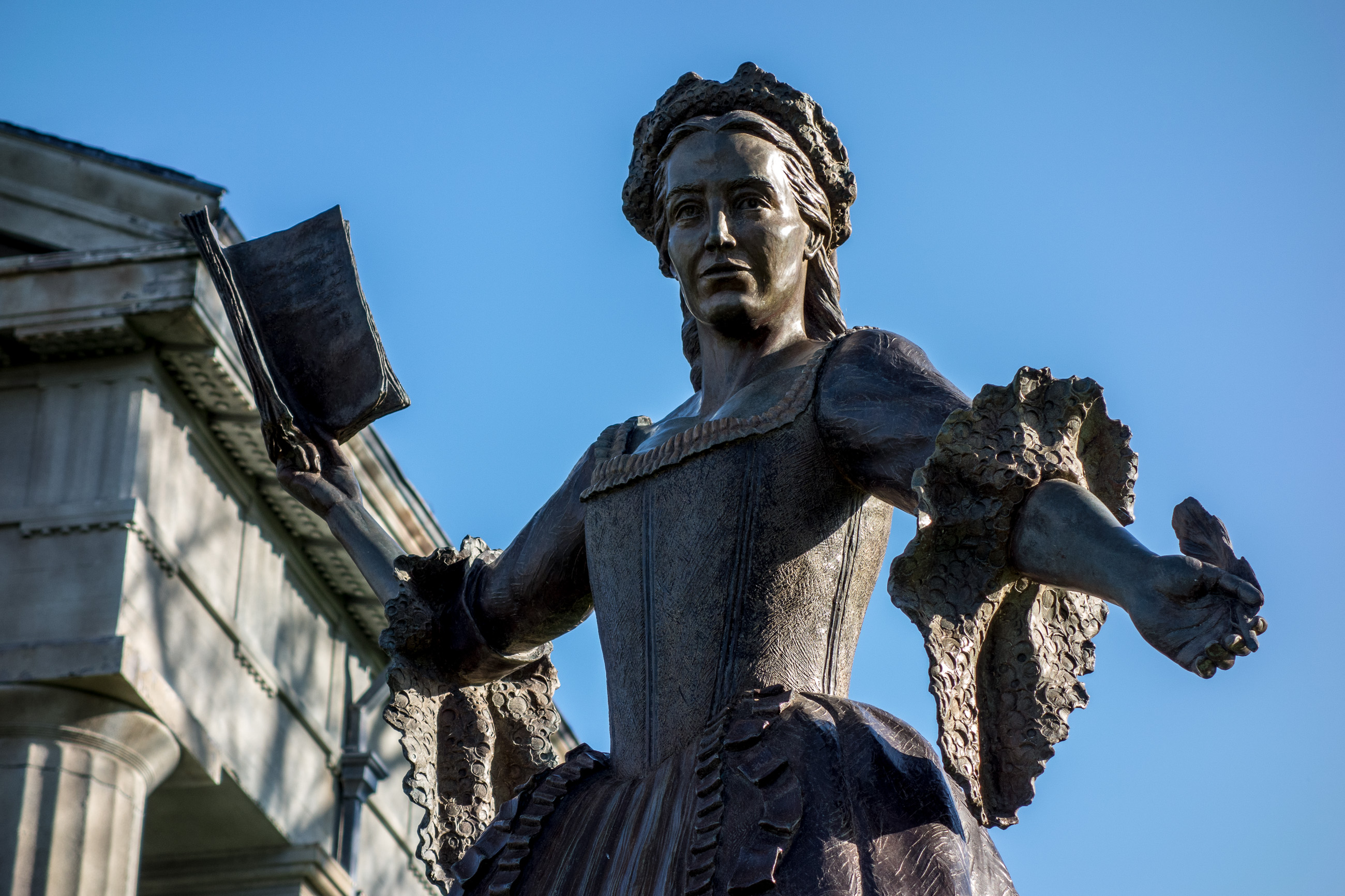
Bronze sculpture of Mercy Otis Warren stands to the right of the courthouse entrance

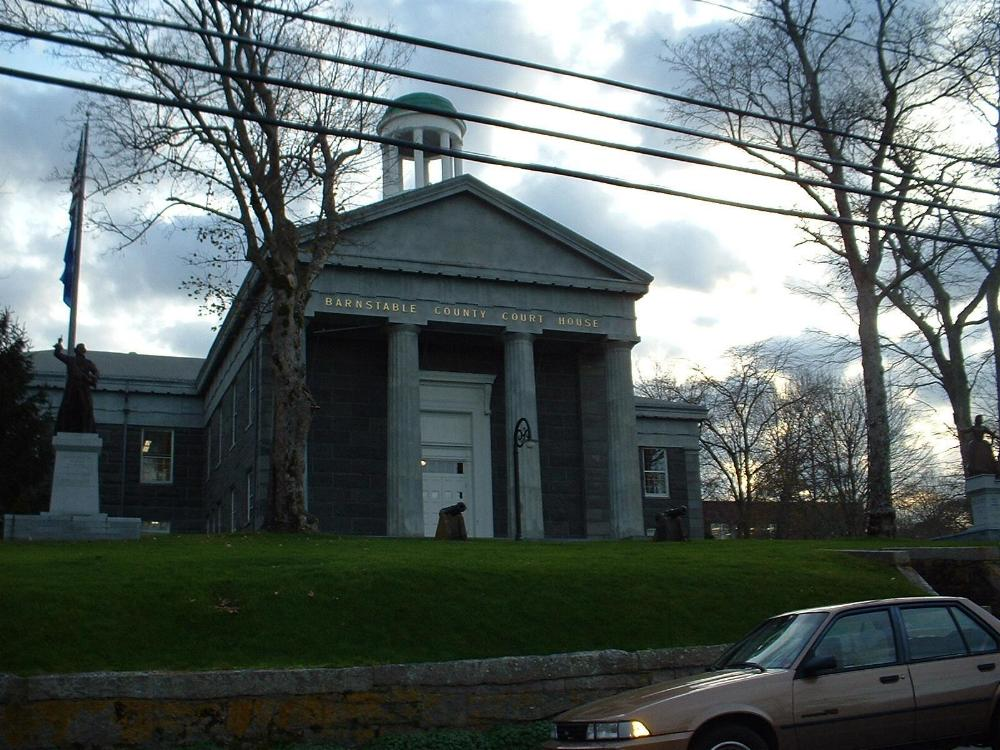
Barnstable County Court House, in Barnstable

== See also ==
- National Register of Historic Places listings in Barnstable County, Massachusetts
