= Albany Congress =

1754 meeting of British American colonies

- Part of the French and Indian War
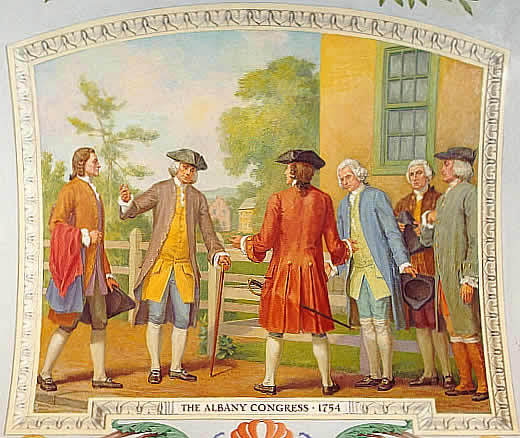
- The Albany Congress · 1754 by Allyn Cox

Type
- Type: Unicameral

History
- Founded: June 19, 1754
- Disbanded: July 11, 1754
- Succeeded by: Stamp Act Congress

Leadership
- Governor: James De Lancey
- Seats: 21

Meeting place
- City Hall (Dutch: Stadt Huys); Albany, New York

The Albany Congress (June 19 – July 11, 1754), also known as the Albany Convention of 1754, was a meeting of representatives sent by the legislatures of seven of the British colonies in British America: New Hampshire, Massachusetts, Rhode Island, Connecticut, New York, Pennsylvania, and Maryland. Those not in attendance included Newfoundland, Nova Scotia, New Jersey, Virginia, Georgia, North Carolina, and South Carolina. Representatives met daily at the City Hall (Dutch: Stadt Huys) in Albany, New York, from June 19 to July 11, 1754, to discuss better relations with the Native American tribes and common defensive measures against the French threat from Canada in the opening stage of the French and Indian War, the North American front of the Seven Years' War between Great Britain and France.

Delegates did not have the goal of creating an American nation; rather, they were colonists with the more limited mission of pursuing a treaty with the Mohawks and other major Iroquois tribes. This was the first time that American colonists had met together, and it provided a model that came into use in setting up the Stamp Act Congress in 1765, as well as the First Continental Congress in 1774, which were preludes to the American Revolution.

== Overview ==
The Albany Congress was the first time in the 18th century that American colonial representatives met to discuss some manner of formal union. In the 17th century, some New England colonies had formed a loose association called the New England Confederation, principally for purposes of defense, as raiding was frequent by French and allied Indian tribes. In the 1680s, the British government created the Dominion of New England as a unifying government over the colonies between the Delaware River and Penobscot Bay, but it was dissolved in 1689. Jacob Leisler summoned an intercolonial congress which met in New York on May 1, 1690, to plan concerted action against the French and Indians, but he attracted only the colonies as far south as Maryland.

== History ==
The Albany delegates spent most of their time debating Benjamin Franklin's Albany Plan of Union to create a unified level of colonial government. The delegates voted approval of a plan that called for a union of 11 colonies, with a president appointed by the British Crown. Each colonial assembly would send 2 to 7 delegates to a "grand council," which would have legislative powers. The Union would have jurisdiction over Indian affairs.

The plan was rejected by the colonies' legislatures, which were protective of their independent charters, and by the Colonial Office, which wanted a military command. Many elements of the plan were later the basis for the American government established by the Articles of Confederation of 1777 (which formally went into effect in 1781) and the Constitution of 1787. Franklin speculated in 1789 that the colonies might not have separated from England so soon if the 1754 plan had been adopted:

On Reflection it now seems probable, that if the foregoing Plan or some thing like it, had been adopted and carried into Execution, the subsequent Separation of the Colonies from the Mother Country might not so soon have happened, nor the Mischiefs suffered on both sides have occurred, perhaps during another Century. For the Colonies, if so united, would have really been, as they then thought themselves, sufficient to their own Defence, and being trusted with it, as by the Plan, an Army from Britain, for that purpose would have been unnecessary: The Pretences for framing the Stamp-Act would not then have existed, nor the other Projects for drawing a Revenue from America to Britain by Acts of Parliament, which were the Cause of the Breach, and attended with such terrible Expence of Blood and Treasure: so that the different Parts of the Empire might still have remained in Peace and Union.

The Congress and its Albany Plan have achieved iconic status as presaging the formation of the United States of America in 1776. It is often illustrated with Franklin's famous snake cartoon Join, or Die.

=== Plan of Union ===
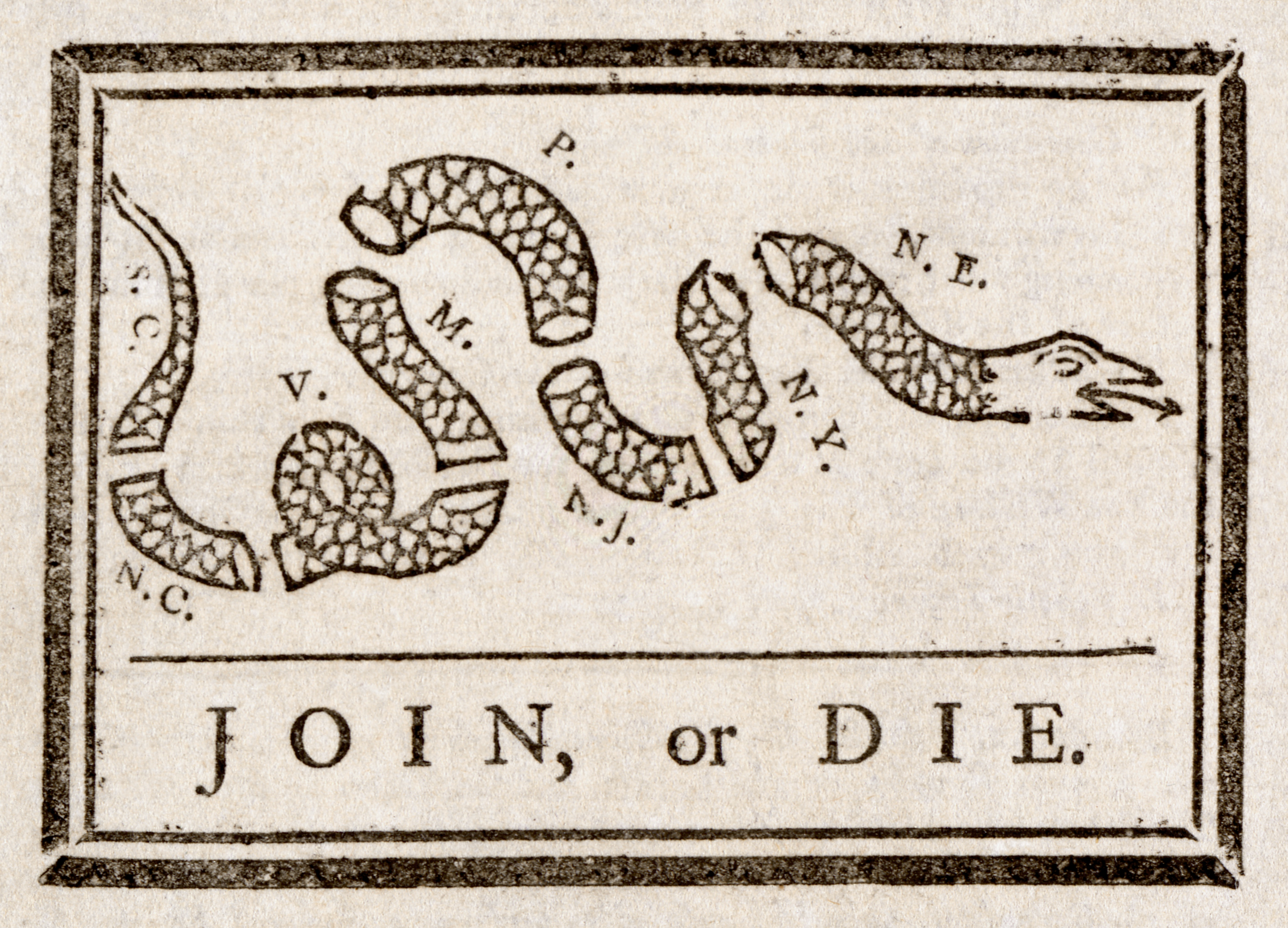
Benjamin Franklin's 1754 cartoon encouraging support for the Congress

Benjamin Franklin's plan to unite the colonies exceeded the scope of the congress, which had been called to plan a defense against the French and Indian threat. The original plan was heavily debated by all who attended the conference, including the young Philadelphia lawyer Benjamin Chew. Numerous modifications were also proposed by Thomas Hutchinson, who later became Governor of Massachusetts. The delegates passed the plan unanimously. They submitted it with their recommendations, but the legislatures of the seven colonies rejected it, as it would have removed some of their existing powers. The plan was never sent to the Crown for approval, although it was submitted to the British Board of Trade, which also rejected it.

The Plan of Union proposed to include all the British North American colonies, although none of the colonies south of Maryland sent representatives to the Albany Congress. (Note that the "Lower Counties on the Delaware" were then administered by Pennsylvania, and Georgia Colony was slow to start.) The plan called for a single executive (President-General) to be appointed by the King, who would be responsible for relations with the Indians, military preparedness, and execution of laws regulating various trade and financial activities. It called for a Grand Council to be selected by the colonial legislatures, with the number of delegates to be apportioned according to the taxes paid by each colony. The colonial assemblies rejected the plan, although delegates forming the government after the Revolution incorporated some features in the Articles of Confederation and the Constitution.

== Participants ==
Twenty-one representatives attended the Congress from New York, Pennsylvania, Maryland, Massachusetts, Rhode Island, Connecticut, and New Hampshire. New York Governor James DeLancey was host governor and chairman. Peter Wraxall served as Secretary to the Congress.

Delegates included:

- Connecticut: William Pitkin‡, Roger Wolcott, Elisha Williams
- Maryland: Abraham Barnes, Benjamin Tasker Jr.‡
- Massachusetts: Thomas Hutchinson‡, Oliver Partridge
- New Hampshire: Meshech Weare, Theodore Atkinson‡
- New York: James DeLancey, William Johnson‡, Philip Livingston, William Smith‡
- Pennsylvania: Secretary Benjamin Chew, John Penn, Richard Peters, Isaac Norris, and Benjamin Franklin. Conrad Weiser and Benjamin Franklin's son William‡ attended as extra staff.
- Rhode Island: Martin Howard, Stephen Hopkins‡

‡ Indicates Members of the committee of the Plan of Union

== See also ==
- Albany Plan
- History of the United States Constitution
- Great Britain in the Seven Years War

== Notes ==
First None recognized before	Albany Congress; June 19, 1754 – July 11, 1754	Succeeded by Stamp Act Congress
