= Writ of assistance =

Written order by court to complete a task

A writ of assistance is a written order (a writ) issued by a court instructing a law enforcement official, such as a sheriff or a tax collector, to perform a certain task. Historically, several types of writs have been called "writs of assistance". Most often, a writ of assistance is "used to enforce an order for the possession of lands". When used to evict someone from real property, such a writ is also called a writ of restitution or a writ of possession. In the area of customs, writs of assistance date from Colonial times. They were issued by the Court of Exchequer to help customs officials search for smuggled goods. These writs were called "writs of assistance" because they called upon sheriffs, other officials, and loyal subjects to "assist" the customs official in carrying out his duties.

In general, customs writs of assistance served as general search warrants that did not expire, allowing customs officials to search anywhere for smuggled goods without having to obtain a specific warrant. These writs became controversial when they were issued by courts in British America between 1755 and 1760 (then mirroring like writs having previously been issued, and being enforced, in the motherland by Britain's Exchequer Court), especially the Province of Massachusetts Bay. Controversy over these general writs of assistance inspired the Fourth Amendment to the United States Constitution, which forbids general search warrants in the United States of America. Though generally these colonial writs were no more onerous than the ones enforced in Britain, a fallacious 1760 London Magazine article asserted the writs issued in the motherland "...were specific, not general" thereby generating the perception in the colonies that the colonists were being treated unfairly. John Adams was to later assert that the ensuing court battle was the "seeds of the American Revolution."

== In colonial America ==
General writs of assistance played an important role in the increasing tensions that led to the American Revolution and the creation of the United States of America. In 1760, Great Britain began to enforce some of the provisions of the Navigation Acts by granting customs officers these writs. In New England, smuggling had become common. However, officers could not search a person's property without giving a reason. Colonists protested that the writs violated their rights as British subjects.

Among the grounds for which the colonists opposed the writs were that they were permanent and even transferable; the holder of a writ could assign it to another; any place could be searched at the whim of the holder; and searchers were not responsible for any damage they caused.

All writs of assistance expired six months after the death of the king, at which time new writs had to be obtained. With the death of King George II on 25 October 1760, all writs would expire on 25 April 1761. The crisis began on 27 December 1760 when news of King George II's death reached Boston and the people of Massachusetts learned that all writs faced termination.

=== Paxton's case ===
Within three weeks, the writs were challenged by a group of 63 Boston merchants represented by fiery Boston attorney James Otis Jr. A countersuit was filed by a British customs agent Paxton, and together these are known as "Paxton's case". Otis argued the famous writs of assistance case at the Old State House in Boston in February 1761 and again on 16 November 1761. Otis gave the speech of his life, making references to liberty, English common law, "a man's house is his castle," and the colonists's "rights as Englishmen."

The court ruled against the merchants. However, Otis's arguments were published in the colonies, and stirred widespread support for colonial rights. As a young lawyer John Adams observed the case in the packed courtroom. Moved by Otis's performance and legal arguments, he later declared that "Then and there the child Independence was born".

In a pamphlet published in 1765, Otis expanded his argument that the general writs violated the British unwritten constitution hearkening back to the Magna Carta. Any law in violation of the constitution or "natural law" which underlay it, he said, was void.

=== Malcom Affair ===
A writ of assistance was used in an incident known as the "Malcom Affair", which was described by legal scholar William Cuddihy as "the most famous search in colonial America." The episode demonstrated a fundamental difference between the colonists' view of their rights and the official British view of imperial law. "The Malcom affair was a minor matter, a comedy of blundering revenue officers and barricaded colonials," wrote legal historian John Phillip Reid, "but were we to dismiss it in haste we might run the risk of dismissing much of the story of the American Revolution."

On 24 September 1766, customs officials in Boston, with a deputy sheriff, searched merchant Daniel Malcom's home, which was also his place of business. They claimed the authority to do so by a writ of assistance issued to customs official Benjamin Hallowell, and the information of a confidential informant. Malcom allowed them to search, but denied them access to a locked cellar, arguing that they did not have the legal authority to break it open. According to customs officials, Malcom threatened to use force to prevent them from opening the door; according to Malcom and his supporters, his threat specified resisting any unlawful forced entry.

The officials left and returned with a specific search warrant, only to find that Malcom had locked his house. A crowd supportive of Malcom had gathered around the house; Tories claimed that this "mob" numbered 300 or more people and was hostile to the customs officers, while Whigs insisted that this was a peaceful gathering of about 50 curious onlookers, mostly boys. No violence occurred, but reports written by Governor Francis Bernard and the customs officials created the impression in Britain that a riot had taken place. The incident furthered Boston's reputation in Britain as a lawless town controlled by "mobs", a reputation that would contribute to the government's decision to send troops in 1768.

Although British officials, and some historians, described Malcom as acting in defiance of the law, the constitutional historian John Phillip Reid argued that Malcom's actions were lawful—so precisely lawful, in fact, that Reid speculated that Malcom may have been acting under the advice of his lawyer, James Otis. According to Reid, Malcom and Otis may have been attempting to provoke a lawsuit so that they could once again "challenge the validity of writs of assistance" in court. This was one of several incidents when a Boston merchant resisted a search with a seemingly exact knowledge of the law; John Hancock, a prominent merchant and well-known smuggler, would act in a similar manner when customs officials attempted to search his ship Lydia in 1768.

=== End of colonial writs ===
Uncertainty about the legality of writs of assistance issued by colonial superior courts prompted Parliament to affirm that such writs were legal in the 1767 Townshend Acts. However, most colonial courts refused to issue general writs, and the Malcom case was apparently the last time a writ of assistance was issued in Boston.

=== Legacy ===
In response to the much-hated general writs, several of the colonies included a particularity requirement for search warrants in their constitutions when they established independent governments in 1776; the phrase "particularity requirement" is the legal term of art used in period cases to refer to an express requirement that the target of a search warrant must be "particularly" described in detail. Several years later, the Fourth Amendment to the United States Constitution also contained a particularity requirement that outlawed the use of writs of assistance (and all general search warrants) by the federal government. Later, the Fourth Amendment was incorporated against the states via the Fourteenth Amendment, and writs of assistance were proscribed.

== In the United Kingdom ==
Writs of assistance continue to have force in the United Kingdom and may be used by customs officers to enter any building by force and search and seize anything liable to forfeiture. The officer must have reasonable grounds to suspect that goods liable for forfeiture are kept on the premises and that the goods are likely to be removed, destroyed or lost before a search warrant can be obtained and executed. Writs of assistance are valid from the date of issue and cease to be valid six months after the end of the reign of the monarch under which the order was issued.

== In Canada ==
Until 1985, four federal statutes in Canada—the Customs Act, Excise Tax Act, Food and Drugs Act, and Narcotic Control Act—provided that writs of assistance were to be granted to officers of the Royal Canadian Mounted Police and other federal officers, on a mandatory basis, for enforcement purposes. The notion of a writ of assistance in Canadian statute dates back at least to 1847, when a statute of the Province of Canada was passed providing for writs of assistance in customs enforcement; a statute of Nova Scotia referred to such a writ in 1834, while a New Brunswick statute dated to 1846.

Statutory writs of assistance were described by the Exchequer Court of Canada (now the Federal Court) as "in effect, search warrants unrelated to any particular suspected offence and of continuing operation, which are issued to members of the Royal Canadian Mounted Police and other officers in the service of the Government of Canada to have effect as long as the holder continues to hold the position by virtue of which the writ was issued to him." Perhaps more concisely, one commentator described the legal effect of a writ of assistance as, "to all intents and purposes, a blanket warrant" which "authorizes the holder to search for particular things (e.g., controlled drugs or smuggled goods) anywhere and at any time."

However, since judicial authorization was not required for any given search conducted pursuant to a writ of assistance, this characterization is somewhat misleading. Rather, as noted by the Law Reform Commission of Canada in a 1983 report, "[i]n essence, they are documents that identify their holders as members of a specific class of peace officers with special powers of warrantless search and seizure." Moreover, although search warrants are subject to various common law requirements of particularity, the same was not evidently true for statutory writs of assistance.

In 1984, the Ontario Court of Appeal declared statutory writs of assistance to be contrary to section 8 of the Canadian Charter of Rights and Freedoms. Statutory writs of assistance were repealed in Canada in 1985.
