= James Otis Sr. =

American lawyer

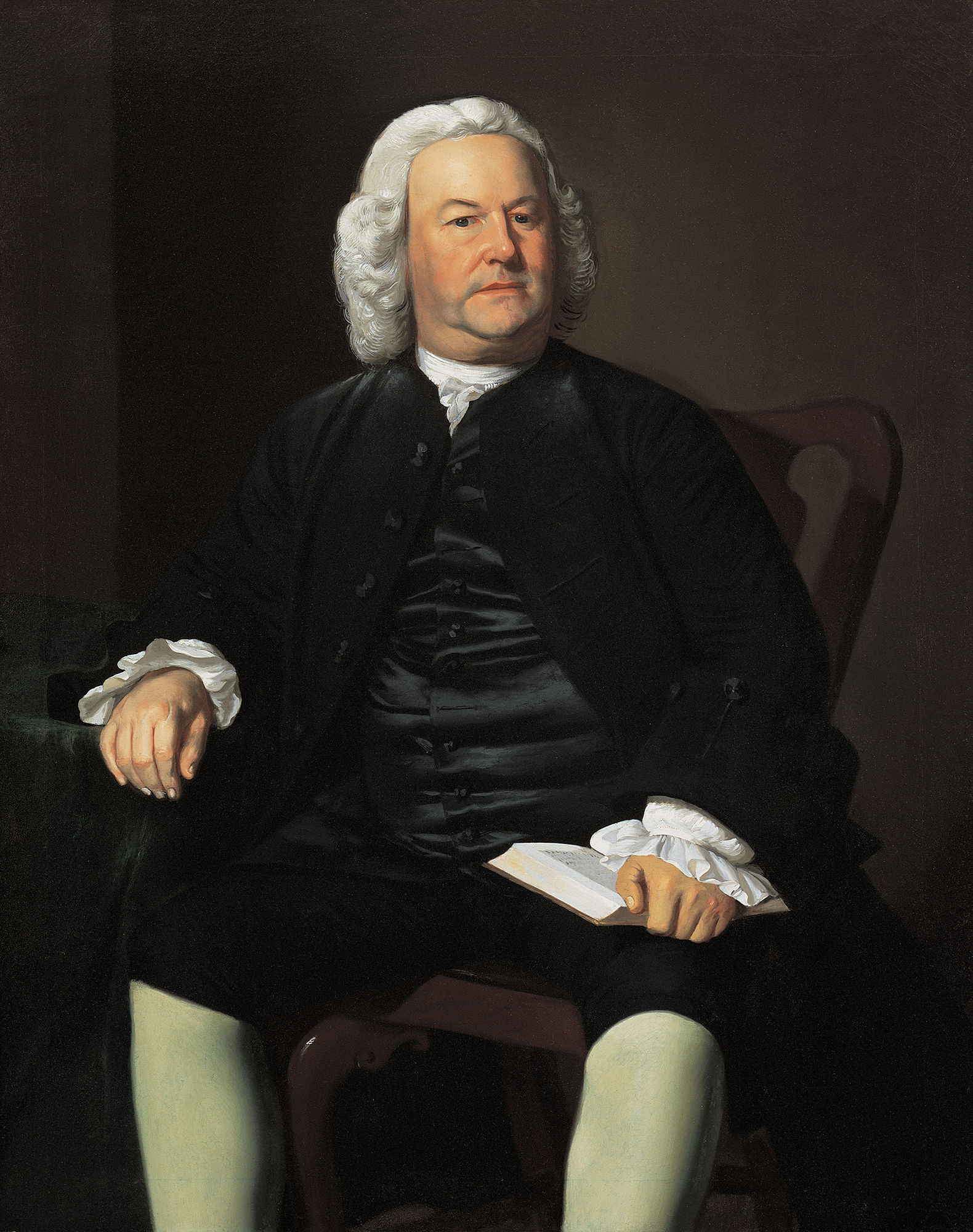
- James Otis Sr. portrait by John Singleton Copley

Personal details
- Born: 1702 Barnstable, Massachusetts Bay Colony
- Died: 1778 (aged 75–76)
- Spouse: Mary Allyne
- Children: James Jr.; Samuel; Mercy
- Relatives: Otis family
- Occupation: Lawyer
- Profession: Politician

Military service
- Allegiance: Province of Massachusetts Bay
- Branch/service: Massachusetts militia
- Rank: Colonel

James Otis Sr. (1702–1778) was a prominent lawyer in the Province of Massachusetts Bay. His sons James Otis Jr. and Samuel Allyne Otis also rose to prominence, as did his daughter Mercy Otis Warren. He was often called "Colonel James" because of his military rank and also to distinguish between him and his famous son. He was a stalwart member of the Popular Party, as was his son, in Boston, Massachusetts.

== Biography ==
Coat of Arms of James Otis, Sr.

Born in Barnstable, Massachusetts, Otis became the undisputed head of the bar in the colony. As a result of his distinguished service, in 1748 Colonel James was appointed Attorney General of the province. Later, in 1762, like his father John (a judge, representative to the Massachusetts Bay General Court, and member of the Council of Massachusetts), he was elected to the Council. Otis expected to be appointed Chief Justice of the Massachusetts Supreme Judicial Court, but the position instead went to Thomas Hutchinson appointed in 1761 by Governor Sir Francis Bernard, 1st Baronet; creating enmity between the Otis and Hutchinson families.

Otis was the presiding justice of the Barnstable County Court of Common Pleas during the Sept. 27, 1774, protest against the British "Intolerable Acts." In meeting the protesters demands, he agreed to ignore the requirements of the Parliament's new legislation and so preserved for Barnstable the large measure of self-government that Massachusetts had enjoyed under its 1691 charter.

His son James Otis Jr. played a key role in opposing the British writs of assistance in 1761, serving to inspire the idea of revolution in the colonies.

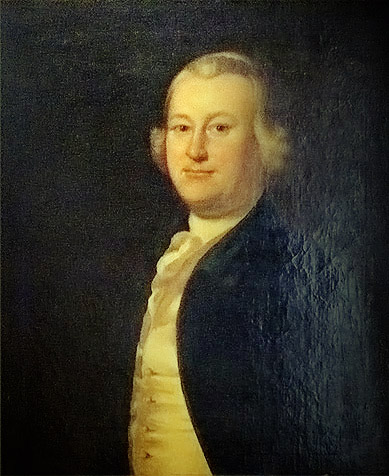
James Otis Jr.

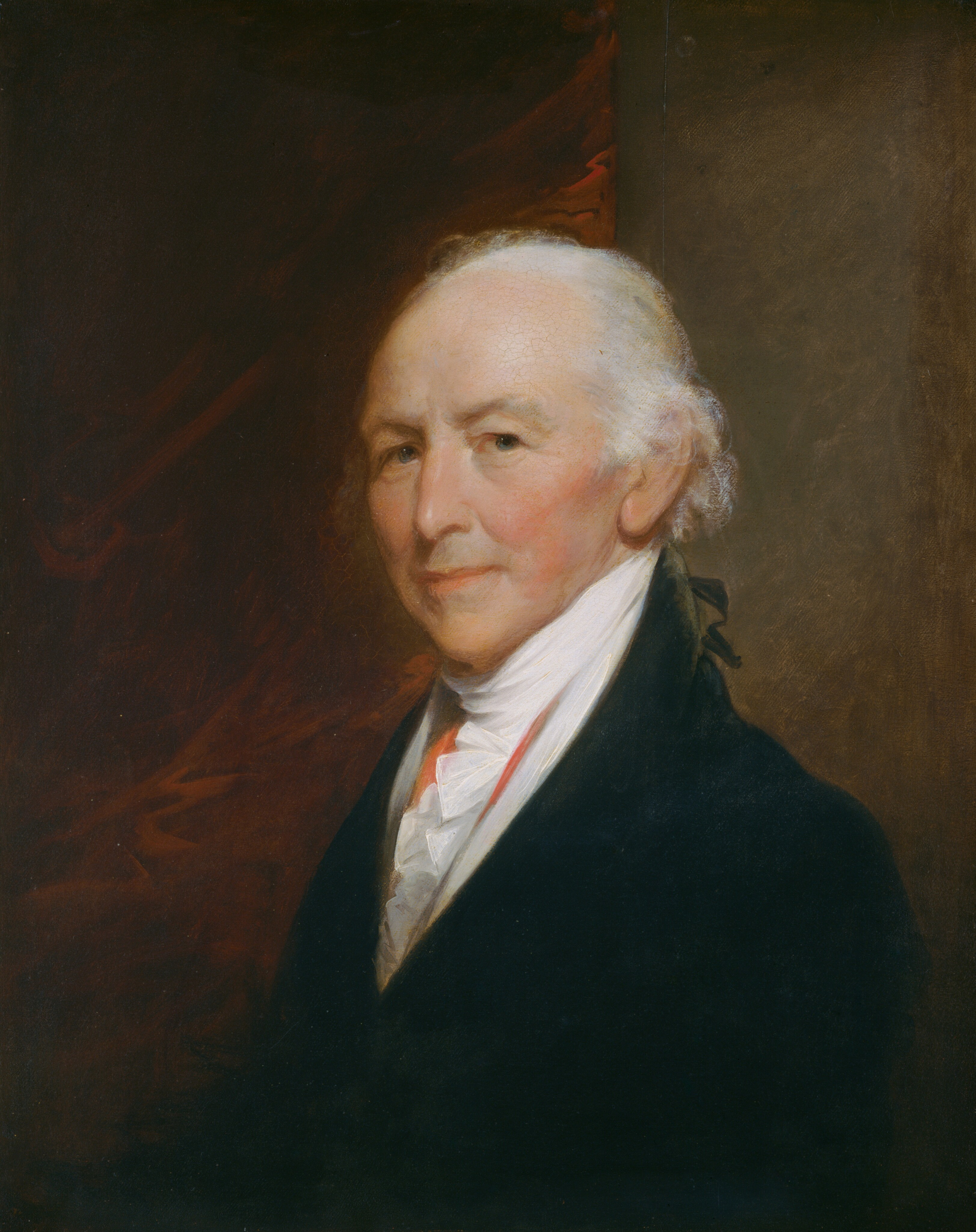
Samuel Allyne Otis

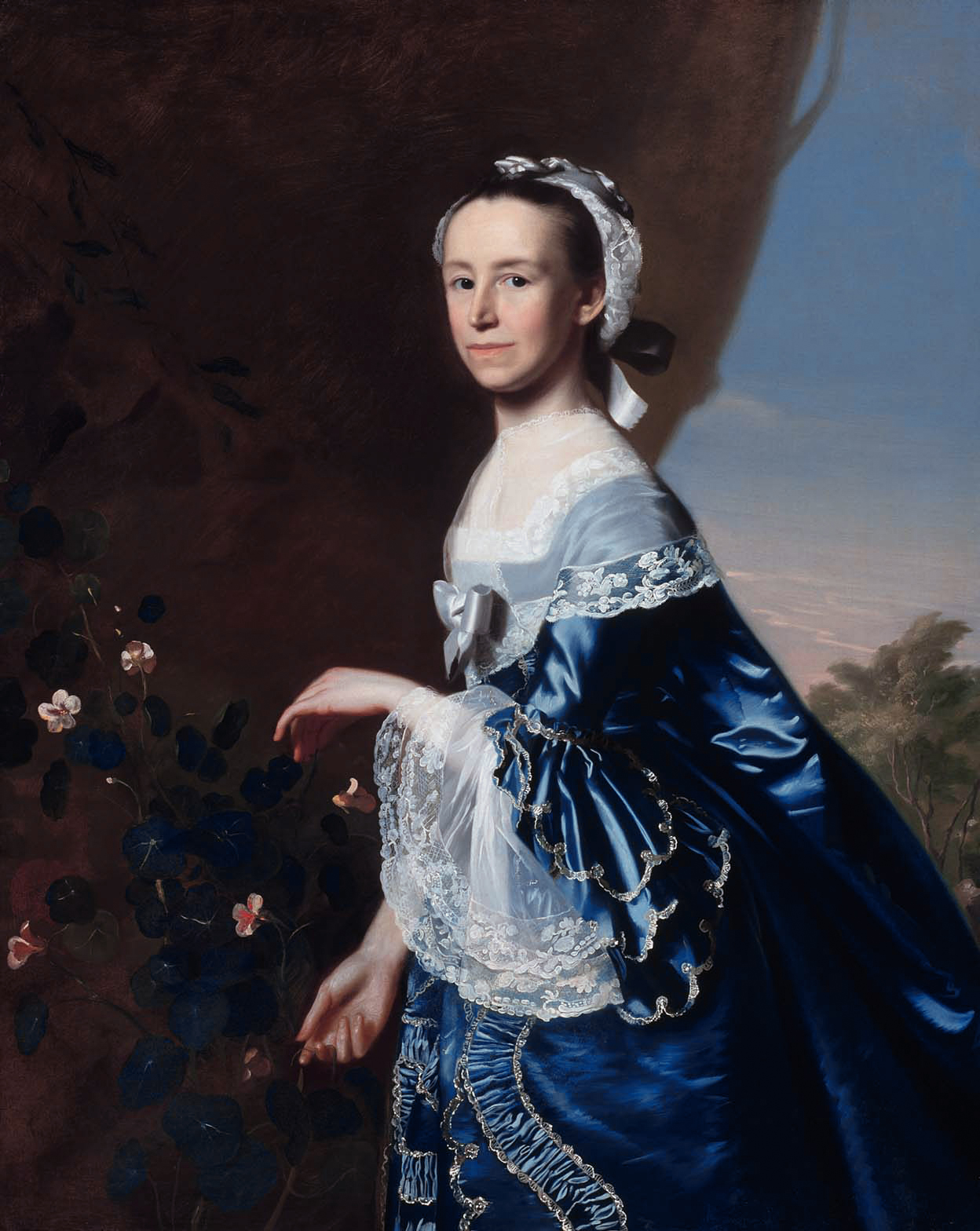
Mercy Otis Warren
