= Old King's Highway Historic District =

Historic district in Massachusetts, United States

- U.S. National Register of Historic Places
- U.S. Historic district
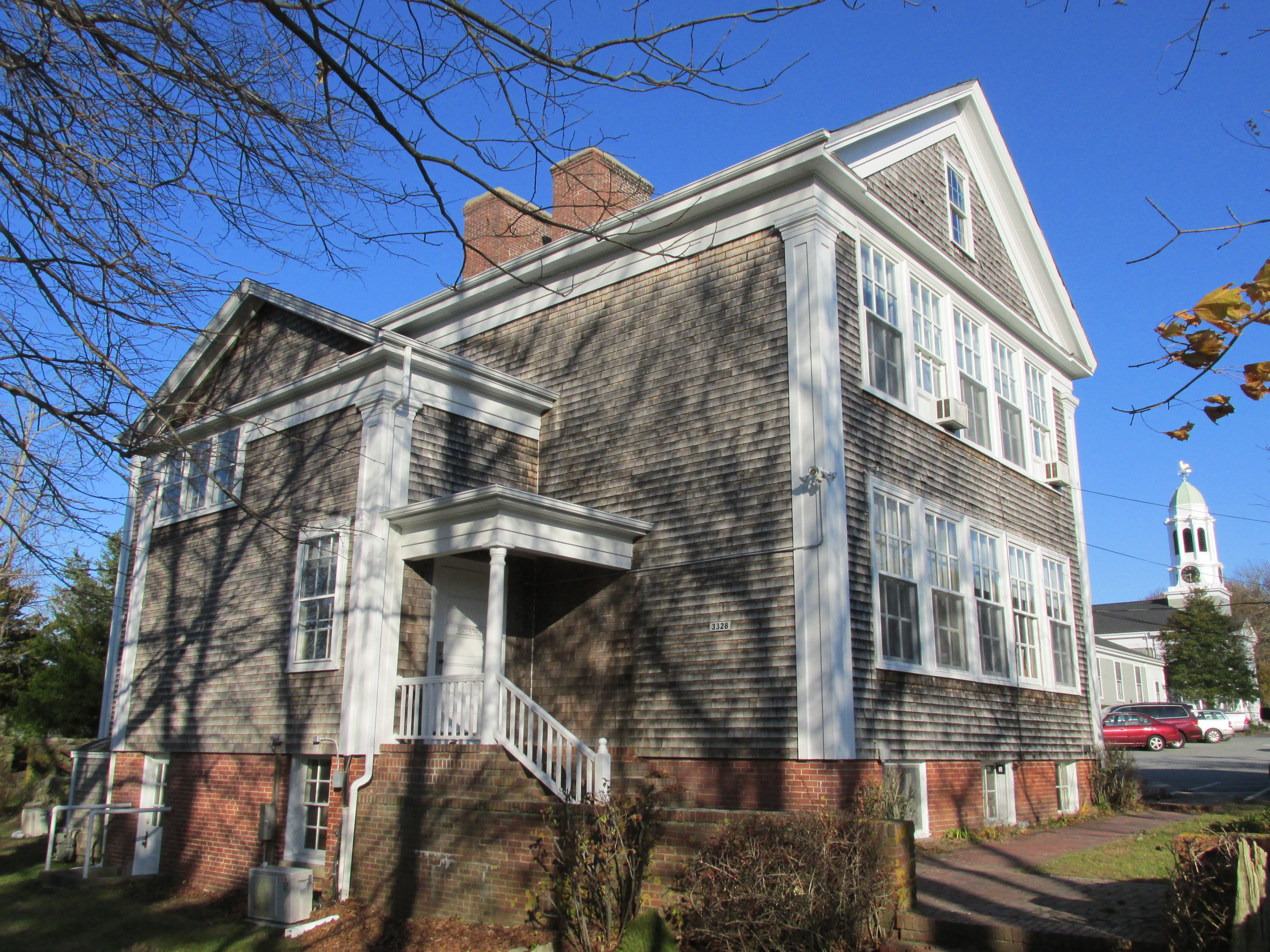
- 1854 Barnstable Village Schoolhouse

- Location within Cape Cod Location within Massachusetts Location within the United States
- Location: Barnstable, Massachusetts
- Coordinates: 41°42′24″N 70°20′20″W
- Area: 1,150 acres (470 ha)
- Architect: Lowell, Guy; Et al.
- Architectural style: Greek Revival, Colonial, Georgian
- MPS: Barnstable MRA
- NRHP reference No.: 87000314
- Added to NRHP: March 12, 1987

The Old King's Highway Historic District encompasses what was historically the principal east–west thoroughfare through Barnstable, Massachusetts. It encompasses Barnstable's entire length of what is now designated Massachusetts Route 6A, called Main Street, between the town lines of Sandwich and Yarmouth. It includes more than 1,000 acres (400 ha) and all buildings whose properties are front on the road, nearly 500 in all. The area consists of the main population centers of Barnstable from its founding in the late 1630s until the mid-19th century when the southern parts of the community became more significant in economic prominence. The district was listed on the National Register of Historic Places in 1987.

The oldest buildings in the district are the Allyn House (2730 Main Street), built in the late 1600s, and the Old Jail, built c. 1690. The Old Jail is the oldest wooden jail in the United States and is now part of a museum complex, including the Old Customshouse. The jail and the customs house are also separately listed on the National Register.

The 1763 county courthouse, at 3046 Rt. 6A, was the scene of a historic mass protest on Sept. 27, 1774, against British efforts to punish Massachusetts for the Boston Tea Party the previous year. The protesters demanded that county officials refuse to obey the Massachusetts Government Act, passed by the British Parliament in May 1774, which stripped the colony of its long-held rights of self-government. County officials agreed, and Royal control of the county effectively ended. The building was converted to a church in 1842.

Because of the shift of Barnstable's economy to more maritime concerns based in villages along its southern coast beginning in the early 19th century, the villages along the King's Highway gradually declined in economic importance, with a resultant decline in construction. As a result, the district has a large number of Federal and Greek Revival properties. Barnstable Village stretched out along the highway remained the civic administrative center of the county, even though town offices were eventually moved to Hyannis. The Barnstable County Courthouse, built in 1831, is one of the landmarks of the area's importance in county administration.

== See also ==
- National Register of Historic Places listings in Barnstable County, Massachusetts
