= James Otis Jr. =

American lawyer and activist

James Otis
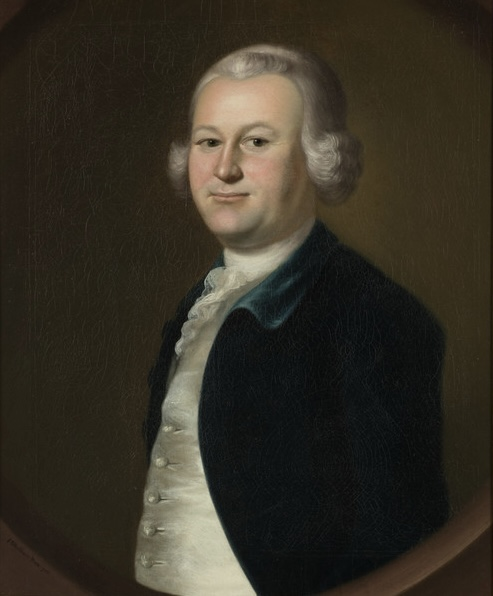
- Portrait by Joseph Blackburn, 1755
- Born: February 5, 1725; Barnstable, Massachusetts Bay, British America
- Died: May 23, 1783 (aged 58); Andover, Massachusetts, U.S.
- Resting place: Granary Burying Ground, Boston
- Occupations: lawyer, political activist, pamphleteer, and legislator
- Known for: Oration against British writs of assistance February 5, 1761, which catapulted him into the first rank of Patriot leaders
- Spouse: Ruth Cunningham (m. 1755)
- Children: James, Elizabeth Brown; Mary
- Parent(s): James Otis Sr. Mary Allyne
- Relatives: Otis family

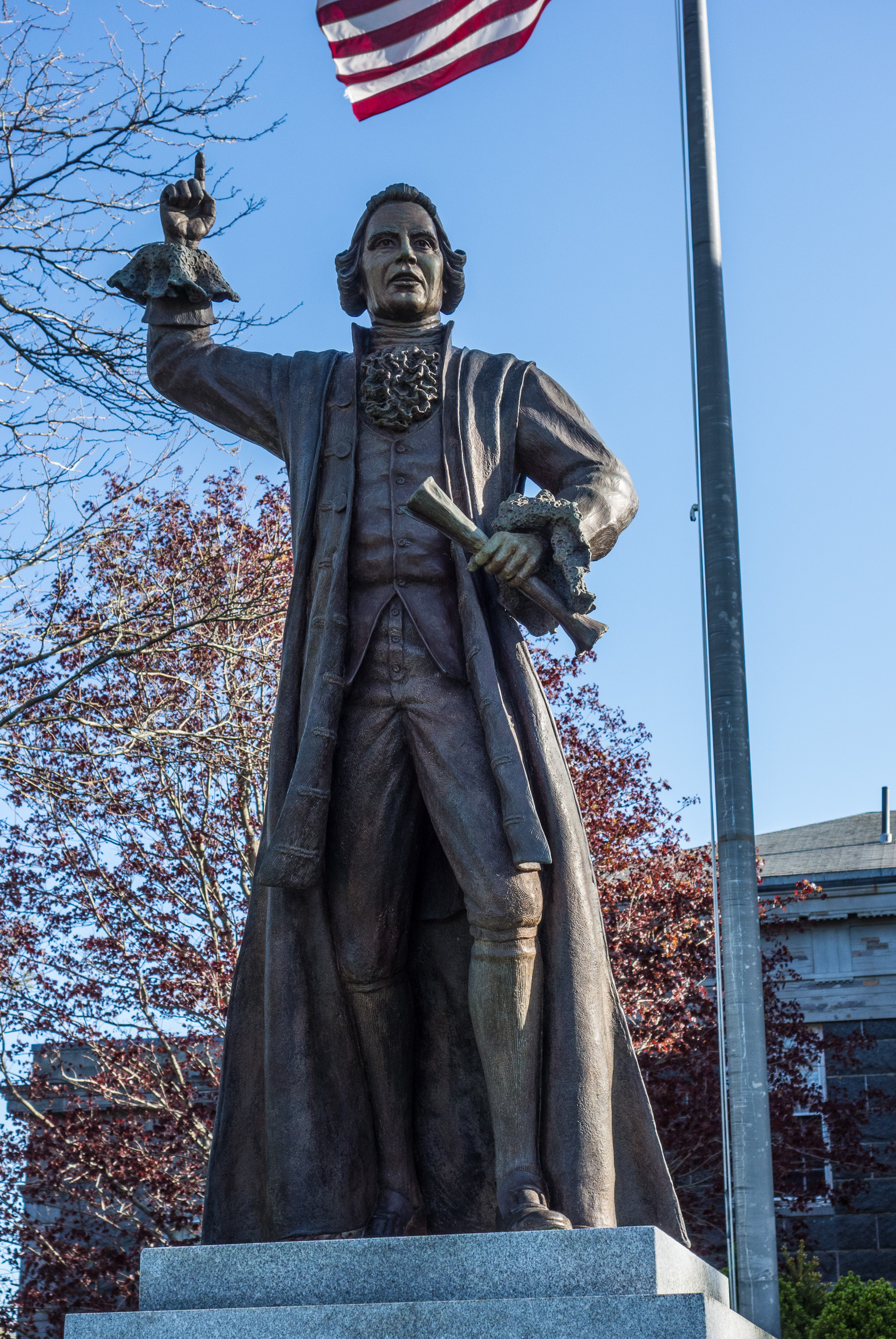
Bronze sculpture of James Otis Jr. in front of the Barnstable County Courthouse

James Otis Jr. (February 5, 1725 – May 23, 1783) was an American lawyer, politician, and activist who was an early supporter of patriotic causes in the Province of Massachusetts Bay at the beginning of the American Revolution. Otis was a fervent opponent of the writs of assistance introduced in 1761 which allowed law enforcement officials to search private property without cause. He later criticized British plans to introduce new taxes in the Thirteen Colonies. As a result, Otis is often credited with coining the slogan "taxation without representation is tyranny".

James was a mentor to Samuel Adams, and his oratorical style inspired John Adams. He is recognized by some as a Founding Father due to his efforts leading up to the Revolutionary War. However, Otis was plagued by mental illness and alcoholism, and his erratic behavior had rendered him inconsequential and embarrassing to the cause by the early 1770s.

== Early life ==
Otis was born in West Barnstable, Massachusetts, the second of 13 children and the first to survive infancy. His sister Mercy and his brothers Joseph and Samuel were leaders during the American Revolution, as was nephew Harrison Gray Otis. His father, Colonel James Otis Sr., was a prominent lawyer and militia officer. Father and son had a tumultuous relationship. His father sent him a letter articulating his disappointments and encouraging him to seek God's righteousness to better himself.

In 1755, Otis married Ruth Cunningham, a merchant's daughter and heiress to a fortune worth £10,000. Their politics were quite different, yet they were attached to each other. John Adams said that Otis later "half-complained that she was a 'High Tory,'" yet in the same breath declared that "she was a good Wife, and too good for him". The marriage produced children James, Elizabeth, and Mary. James died at age 18. Elizabeth was a Loyalist like her mother; she married Captain Brown of the British Army and lived in England for the rest of her life. Mary married Benjamin Lincoln, son of distinguished Continental Army General Benjamin Lincoln.

== Writs of assistance ==
Otis graduated from Harvard in 1743 and rose to the top of the Boston legal profession. In 1760, he received a prestigious appointment as Advocate General of the Admiralty Court. He promptly resigned, however, when Governor Francis Bernard failed to appoint his father to the promised position of Chief Justice of the province's highest court; the position instead went to Otis's longtime opponent Thomas Hutchinson.

In the 1761 case Paxton v. Gray, a group of outraged Boston businessmen engaged Otis to challenge the legality of "writs of assistance" before the Superior Court, the predecessor of the Massachusetts Supreme Judicial Court. These writs enabled the authorities to enter any home with no advance notice, no probable cause, and no reason given.

Otis considered himself a loyal subject to the Crown, yet he argued against the writs of assistance in a nearly five-hour oration before a select audience in the State House in February 1761. His argument failed to win his case, but it galvanized the revolutionary movement.

John Adams recollected years later: "Otis was a flame of fire; with a promptitude of classical allusions, a depth of research, a rapid summary of historical events and dates, a profusion of legal authorities." Adams promoted Otis as a major player in the coming of the Revolution, writing nearly 50 years later: "Then and there was the first scene of the first Act of opposition to the Arbitrary claims of Great Britain. Then and there the Child Independence was born. ... The seeds of Patriots & Heroes ... were then & there sown."

The text of his 1761 speech was much enhanced by Adams on several occasions; it was first printed in 1773 and in longer forms in 1819 and 1823. According to James R. Ferguson, the four tracts that Otis wrote during 1764–65 reveal contradictions and even intellectual confusion. Otis was the first leader of the period to develop distinctive American theories of constitutionalism and representation, but he relied on traditional views of Parliamentary authority. He refused to follow the logical direction of his natural law theory by drawing back from radicalism, according to Ferguson, who feels that Otis appears inconsistent. Samuelson, on the other hand, argues that Otis should be seen as a practical political thinker rather than a theorist, which explains why his positions changed as he adjusted to altered political realities.

In 1764, Otis expanded his argument in a pamphlet stating that Americans lacked proper Parliamentary representation, making it unconstitutional for Parliament to tax Americans. According to Matthew K. Reising, Otis developed his argument regarding Parliamentary authority by examining the effects of the Glorious Revolution in America rather than the historical situation of 17th century Britain. In the Writs case, Otis said that "An Act against the constitution is void … and if an act of Parliament should be made … the executive courts must pass such acts into disuse."

Otis did not identify himself as a revolutionary; his peers, too, generally viewed him as more cautious than the incendiary Samuel Adams. Otis, at times, counseled against the mob violence of the radicals and argued against Adams's proposal for a convention of all the colonies resembling that of the Glorious Revolution of 1688. Yet, on other occasions, Otis exceeded Adams in rousing passions and exhorting people to action. He even called his compatriots to arms at a town meeting on September 12, 1768, according to some accounts. He was a Freemason.

== Pamphleteer ==
Otis was originally in the rural Popular Party, but he effectively made alliances with Boston merchants and grew in popularity after the controversy of the Writs of Assistance case. He subsequently wrote several important patriotic pamphlets, served in the assembly, and was a leader of the Stamp Act Congress. He also was friends with Thomas Paine, the author of Common Sense.

Otis asserted that African Americans had inalienable rights, and he favored extending the freedoms of life, liberty, and property to them. The idea of racial equality also permeates his Rights of the British Colonies (1764), in which he states:

The colonists are by the law of nature freeborn, as indeed all men are, white or black.

— James Otis, Rights of the British Colonies, 1764

== Injury and cognitive decline ==
Otis was known for being "fiery and fev'rous" which caused him to be "liable to great inequalities of Temper". On September 4, 1769, Otis threatened several customs officials in an advertisement in the Boston Gazzete. The following day Otis was involved in a brawl with customs officer John Robinson at the British Coffee House where he sustained a serious head injury. By January 1770, John Adams noted, "Otis is in confusion yet. He rambles and wanders like a ship without a helm...I fear he is not in his perfect Mind." Thomas Cushing and others reported that Otis was "Madraving vs. father, wife, brother, sister, friend..."

The following year on December 3, 1771, Otis was certified a "distracted person" by the Selectman of Boston. Governor Thomas Hutchinson wrote to Francis Bernard regarding the event that "Otis was carried off today in a post chaise, bound hand and foot. He has been as good as his word—set the Province in a flame and perished in the attempt." By the end of the 1770s, Otis's public life largely came to an end, though he was able to do occasional legal practice during times of clarity. Whether the injury in 1769 directly caused or intensified mental health struggles Otis already possessed is unknown.

Otis spent the remainder of his life battling brain injury while living with friends and family in the Massachusetts countryside. Massachusetts Governor John Hancock held a dinner in his honor in 1783, but the event was too much for Otis's fragile mental state and he returned to the countryside.

== Later life and death ==
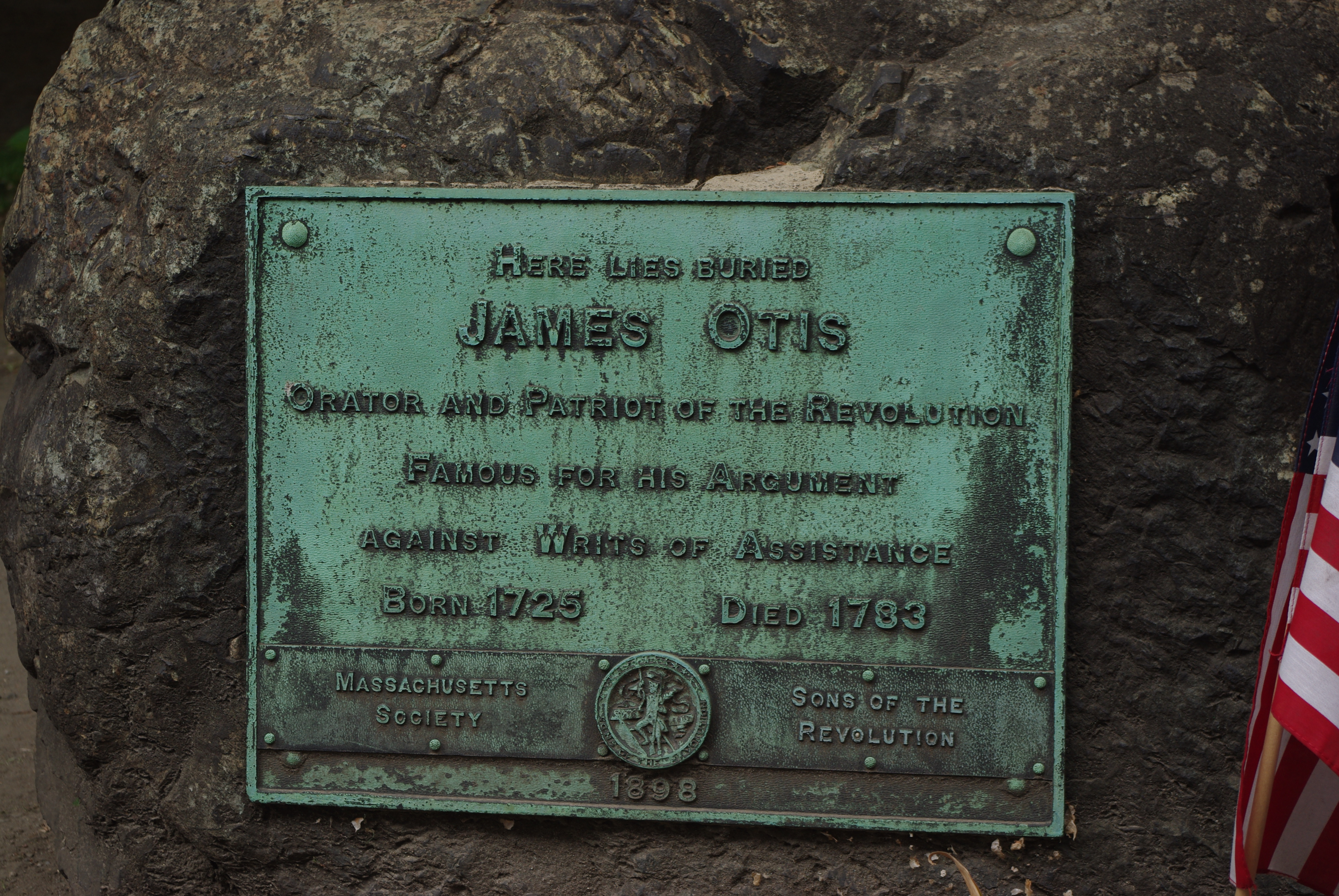
James Otis's grave in the Granary Burying Ground

Near the end of his life, Otis burned the majority of his papers without explanation. Historians and biographers have access to his published papers, but this act prevented deeper insights into his life and thoughts that are available for other historical figures. On May 23, 1783, Otis died as a result of being struck by lightning while watching a thunderstorm from the doorway of a friend's home.

== Selected published works ==
- The Rudiments of Latin Prosody (1760). Otis published the first of two treatises on prosody, and his alma mater Harvard eventually adapted it as a textbook.
- A Vindication of the Conduct of the House of Representatives (1762). The first political publication by Otis. Here he uses an example of an expenditure not sanctioned by the colonial legislature as the foundation of his theory that taxes can be charged only by a representative government. In effect, he summarizes the argument that held a central place in Revolutionary rhetoric.
- The Rights of the British Colonies Asserted and Proved (1764). This pamphlet sets down another important philosophy underpinning the Revolutionary debate: it asserts that rights are not derived from human institutions, but from nature and God. Thus, government does not exist to please monarchs but to promote the good of the entire society.
- Considerations on Behalf of the Colonists (1765). This pamphlet expands the author's argument from The Rights of the British Colonies Asserted and Proved. He furthers the notion of natural rights by linking it to the theory of equal representation.
- In 1765 Otis also authored the pamphlets Vindication of the British Colonies and Brief Remarks on the Defence of the Halifax Libel, his last, in which he grants Parliament complete authority over the colonies. Scholars have settled on two explanations for his drastic reversal: either he temporarily became mentally ill, or he intended to use these pieces to defend himself against charges of treason.
