= National Register of Historic Places listings in Barnstable, Massachusetts =

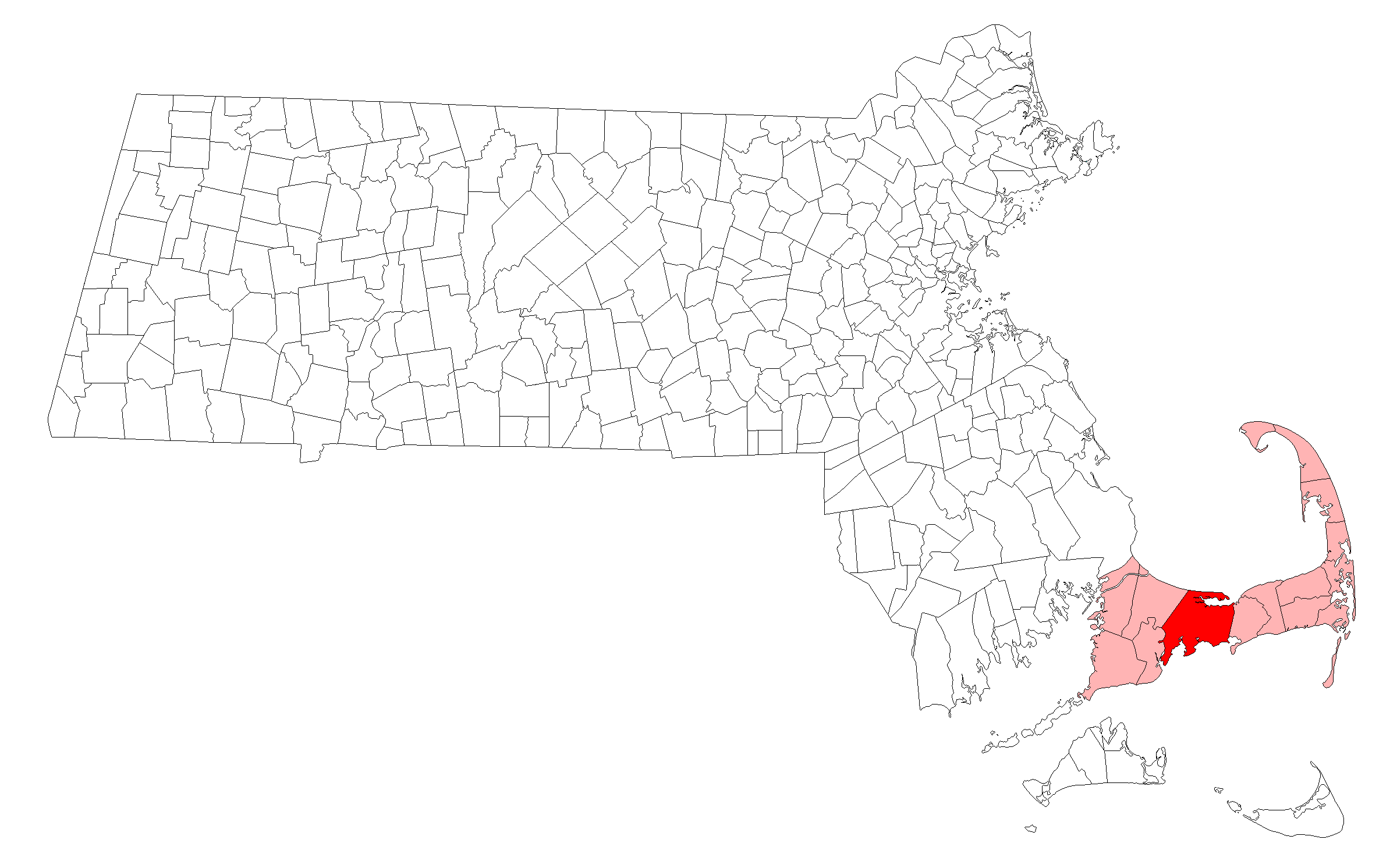

Barnstable, Massachusetts, has more than 75 entries on the National Register of Historic Places. For listings elsewhere in Barnstable County, see National Register of Historic Places listings in Barnstable County, Massachusetts.

Contents: Counties in Massachusetts

Barnstable | Berkshire | Bristol | Dukes | Essex | Franklin | Hampden | Hampshire | Middlesex | Nantucket | Norfolk | Plymouth | Suffolk | Worcester

This National Park Service list is complete through NPS recent listings posted April 24, 2026.

== Current listings ==
	Name on the Register	Image	Date listed	Location	City or town	Description
1	Adams-Crocker-Fish House	Adams-Crocker-Fish House	March 13, 1987 (#87000219)	449 Willow St. 41°42′07″N 70°23′22″W	Barnstable	
2	Josiah A. Ames House	Josiah A. Ames House	September 18, 1987 (#87000300)	145 Bridge St. 41°37′20″N 70°23′46″W	Barnstable	
3	Ancient Burying Ground	Ancient Burying Ground	March 13, 1987 (#87000283)	Phinney's Ln. 41°39′17″N 70°20′38″W	Barnstable	
4	Benjamin Baker Jr. House	Benjamin Baker Jr. House	November 10, 1987 (#87000352)	1579 Hyannis Rd. 41°41′42″N 70°18′12″W	Barnstable	
5	Capt. Seth Baker Jr. House	Capt. Seth Baker Jr. House	September 18, 1987 (#87000299)	35 Main St. 41°39′22″N 70°16′22″W	Barnstable	
6	Nathaniel Baker House	Nathaniel Baker House	March 13, 1987 (#87000229)	1606 Hyannis Rd. 41°41′45″N 70°18′08″W	Barnstable	
7	Barnstable County Courthouse	Barnstable County Courthouse	June 11, 1981 (#81000104)	Main St. 41°42′05″N 70°18′17″W	Barnstable	
8	Capt. Rodney J. Baxter House	Capt. Rodney J. Baxter House	March 13, 1987 (#87000273)	South and Pearl Sts. 41°39′00″N 70°17′06″W	Barnstable	
9	Capt. Sylvester Baxter House	Capt. Sylvester Baxter House	March 13, 1987 (#87000313)	156 Main St. 41°39′19″N 70°16′39″W	Barnstable	
10	Charles L. Baxter House	Charles L. Baxter House	March 13, 1987 (#87000315)	77 Main St. 41°38′08″N 70°27′02″W	Barnstable	
11	Shubael Baxter House	Shubael Baxter House	September 18, 1987 (#87000304)	9 E. Bay Rd. 41°37′39″N 70°22′49″W	Barnstable	
12	Capt. Allen H. Bearse House	Capt. Allen H. Bearse House	March 13, 1987 (#87000264)	48 Camp St. 41°39′25″N 70°16′33″W	Barnstable	
13	Capt. Oliver Bearse House	Capt. Oliver Bearse House	March 13, 1987 (#87000276)	39 Pearl St. 41°39′03″N 70°17′07″W	Barnstable	Damaged by fire in 2011 and subsequently demolished.
14	Blish-Garret House	Blish-Garret House	March 13, 1987 (#87000327)	350 Plum St. 41°41′41″N 70°21′21″W	Barnstable	
15	Building at 237–239 Main Street	Building at 237–239 Main Street	March 13, 1987 (#87000293)	237–239 Main St. 41°39′16″N 70°16′49″W	Barnstable	
16	Building at 600 Main Street	Building at 600 Main Street	March 13, 1987 (#87000286)	600 Main St. 41°38′56″N 70°17′28″W	Barnstable	
17	Building at 606 Main Street	Building at 606 Main Street	March 13, 1987 (#87000287)	606 Main St. 41°38′56″N 70°17′28″W	Barnstable	
18	Building at 614 Main Street	Building at 614 Main Street	March 13, 1987 (#87000285)	614 Main St. 41°38′56″N 70°17′28″W	Barnstable	
19	Collen C. Campbell House	Collen C. Campbell House	March 13, 1987 (#87000297)	599 Main St. 41°38′57″N 70°17′34″W	Barnstable	converted to restaurant
20	Canary-Hartnett House	Canary-Hartnett House	March 13, 1987 (#87000260)	113 Winter St. 41°39′10″N 70°17′14″W	Barnstable	
21	Centerville Historic District	Centerville Historic District	November 10, 1987 (#87002587)	Main St. 41°38′56″N 70°20′53″W	Barnstable	
22	Lemuel B. Chase House	Lemuel B. Chase House	March 13, 1987 (#87000267)	340 Scudder Ave. 41°38′21″N 70°18′14″W	Barnstable	
23	Col. Charles Codman Estate	Col. Charles Codman Estate	March 13, 1987 (#87000321)	Bluff Point Dr. 41°36′41″N 70°25′58″W	Barnstable	
24	Cotuit Historic District	Cotuit Historic District	November 10, 1987 (#87000317)	Main St., Lowell and Ocean View Aves. bounded by Osterville Harbor, Nantucket Sound, and Popponessett Bay; 41°36′57″N 70°26′14″W	Barnstable	
25	Craigville Historic District	Craigville Historic District	November 10, 1987 (#87000275)	Centerville Harbor, Nantucket Sound, Red Lily Pond, and Lake Elizabeth; 41°38′29″N 70°19′58″W	Barnstable	
26	Benomi and Barnabas Crocker House	Benomi and Barnabas Crocker House	March 13, 1987 (#87000216)	325 Willow St. 41°42′18″N 70°23′10″W	Barnstable	
27	Capt. Alexander Crocker House	Capt. Alexander Crocker House	March 13, 1987 (#87000274)	358 Sea St. 41°38′20″N 70°17′27″W	Barnstable	
28	Ebenezer Crocker Jr. House	Ebenezer Crocker Jr. House	November 10, 1987 (#87000323)	49 Putnam Ave. 41°37′17″N 70°26′03″W	Barnstable	
29	Lot Crocker House	Lot Crocker House	March 13, 1987 (#87000263)	284 Gosnold St. 41°38′19″N 70°17′27″W	Barnstable	
30	Daniel Crosby House	Daniel Crosby House	September 18, 1987 (#87000306)	18 Bay St. 41°37′44″N 70°23′18″W	Barnstable	
31	Crowell-Smith House	Crowell-Smith House	March 13, 1987 (#87000272)	33 Pine St. 41°38′57″N 70°17′19″W	Barnstable	
32	Fuller House	Fuller House	March 13, 1987 (#87000325)	Parker Rd. 41°41′42″N 70°22′01″W	Barnstable	
33	Gifford Farm	Gifford Farm	March 13, 1987 (#87000245)	261 Cotuit Rd. 41°39′26″N 70°24′43″W	Barnstable	
34	Dr. Edward Francis Gleason House	Dr. Edward Francis Gleason House	September 18, 1987 (#87000262)	88 Lewis Bay Rd. 41°39′10″N 70°16′30″W	Barnstable	
35	Goodspeed House	Goodspeed House	March 13, 1987 (#87000235)	271 River Rd. 41°39′32″N 70°25′10″W	Barnstable	
36	Capt. Thomas Gray House	Capt. Thomas Gray House	March 13, 1987 (#87000280)	14 Main St. 41°39′25″N 70°16′20″W	Barnstable	
37	Capt. William Hallett House	Capt. William Hallett House	September 18, 1987 (#87000296)	570 Main St. 41°38′59″N 70°17′24″W	Barnstable	
38	Seth Hallett House	Seth Hallett House	September 18, 1987 (#87000298)	110 Main St. 41°39′22″N 70°16′32″W	Barnstable	
39	Harlow Homestead	Harlow Homestead	September 18, 1987 (#87000324)	391 Main St. 41°37′42″N 70°26′35″W	Barnstable	
40	Gideon Hawley House	Gideon Hawley House	March 13, 1987 (#87000312)	4766 Falmouth Rd. 41°38′11″N 70°27′16″W	Barnstable	
41	Hinckley Homestead	Hinckley Homestead	September 18, 1987 (#87000248)	1740 S. County Rd. 41°38′57″N 70°23′52″W	Barnstable	
42	Capt. Joseph Hinckley House	Capt. Joseph Hinckley House	March 13, 1987 (#87000249)	142 Old Stage Rd. 41°39′14″N 70°21′02″W	Barnstable	
43	Nymphus Hinckley House	Nymphus Hinckley House	March 13, 1987 (#87000250)	38 Bay St. 41°37′44″N 70°23′18″W	Barnstable	
44	S. Alexander Hinckley House	S. Alexander Hinckley House	September 18, 1987 (#87000279)	151 Pine St. 41°38′48″N 70°17′13″W	Barnstable	
45	Hyannis Port Historic District	Hyannis Port Historic District	November 10, 1987 (#87000259)	Roughly bounded by Massachusetts Ave.and Edgehill Rd., Hyannis Ave., Hyannis Harbor, and Scudder Ave. 41°37′52″N 70°17′55″W	Barnstable	
46	Hyannis Road Historic District	Hyannis Road Historic District	March 13, 1987 (#87000231)	Bounded by Old King's Highway, Bow Ln., Cape Cod Branch railroad tracks, and Hyannis Rd. 41°41′23″N 70°18′04″W	Barnstable	
47	Herman Isham House	Herman Isham House	March 13, 1987 (#87000295)	1322 Main St. 41°38′27″N 70°23′34″W	Barnstable	
48	John Jenkins Homestead	John Jenkins Homestead	March 13, 1987 (#87000318)	Church St. 41°41′41″N 70°22′12″W	Barnstable	
49	Joseph Jenkins House	Joseph Jenkins House	March 13, 1987 (#87000322)	310 Pine St. 41°41′29″N 70°22′15″W	Barnstable	
50	Jenkins-Whelden Farmstead	Jenkins-Whelden Farmstead	March 13, 1987 (#87000320)	221 Pine St. 41°41′30″N 70°22′29″W	Barnstable	
51	Kennedy Compound	Kennedy Compound	November 28, 1972 (#72001302)	Irving and Marchant Aves. 41°37′49″N 70°18′12″W	Hyannis Port	Historic homes of the Kennedy family
52	Liberty Hall	Liberty Hall	March 13, 1987 (#87000246)	Main St. 41°39′15″N 70°24′46″W	Barnstable	
53	Lincoln House Club	Lincoln House Club	March 13, 1987 (#87000301)	135 Bridge St. 41°37′19″N 70°23′47″W	Barnstable	
54	Capt. George Lovell House	Capt. George Lovell House	November 10, 1987 (#87000290)	8 E. Bay Rd. 41°37′40″N 70°22′46″W	Barnstable	
55	Nehemiah Lovell House	Nehemiah Lovell House	September 18, 1987 (#87000291)	691 Main St. 41°37′38″N 70°22′51″W	Barnstable	
56	William Marston House	William Marston House	March 13, 1987 (#87000234)	71 Cotuit Rd. 41°39′08″N 70°24′53″W	Barnstable	
57	Marstons Mills Hearse House and Cemetery	Marstons Mills Hearse House and Cemetery	March 13, 1987 (#87000302)	MA 149; 41°39′43″N 70°24′31″W	Barnstable	
58	Merrill Estate	Merrill Estate	September 18, 1987 (#87000268)	1874 S. County Rd. 41°39′06″N 70°24′11″W	Barnstable	
59	Methodist Church	Methodist Church	March 13, 1987 (#87000247)	2135 Main St. 41°39′14″N 70°24′43″W	Barnstable	Now the Marstons Mills Community Church
60	Mill Way Historic District	Mill Way Historic District	November 10, 1987 (#87000271)	Mill Way Rd. 41°42′12″N 70°18′01″W	Barnstable	
61	Municipal Group Historic District	Municipal Group Historic District	November 10, 1987 (#87000288)	Roughly bounded by Main, Municipal Buildings, South, and Pearl Sts. 41°39′06″N 70°17′02″W	Barnstable	
62	Old Jail	Old Jail	July 2, 1971 (#71000078)	U.S. Route 6A; 41°42′00″N 70°17′56″W	Barnstable	
63	Old King's Highway Historic District	Old King's Highway Historic District	March 12, 1987 (#87000314)	Old King's Highway between the Sandwich town line on the west to the Yarmouth town line on the east 41°42′24″N 70°20′20″W	Barnstable	
64	Osterville Baptist Church	Osterville Baptist Church	September 18, 1987 (#87000292)	Main St. 41°37′41″N 70°23′09″W	Barnstable	
65	William and Jane Phinney House	William and Jane Phinney House	March 13, 1987 (#87000284)	555 Phinney's Ln. 41°39′47″N 70°19′42″W	Barnstable	
66	Pleasant-School Street Historic District	Pleasant-School Street Historic District	November 10, 1987 (#87000257)	Roughly bounded by Main, School, South, and Pleasant Sts. 41°39′12″N 70°16′42″W	Barnstable	
67	Nelson Rhodehouse House	Nelson Rhodehouse House	March 13, 1987 (#87000308)	131 Main St. 41°38′02″N 70°26′59″W	Barnstable	
68	John Richardson House	John Richardson House	September 18, 1987 (#87000281)	242 Phinney's Ln. 41°39′28″N 70°20′21″W	Barnstable	
69	Joseph Robbins House	Joseph Robbins House	November 10, 1987 (#87000289)	12 Bay St. 41°37′44″N 70°23′18″W	Barnstable	
70	Round House	Round House	March 13, 1987 (#87000282)	971 W. Main St. 41°39′23″N 70°19′46″W	Barnstable	
71	Sampson's Folly-Josiah Sampson House	Sampson's Folly-Josiah Sampson House	September 18, 1987 (#87000326)	40 Old King's Rd. 41°37′49″N 70°26′53″W	Barnstable	
72	Sandy Neck Cultural Resources District	Sandy Neck Cultural Resources District	November 10, 1987 (#87000305)	Sandy Neck Peninsula; 41°43′57″N 70°20′25″W	Barnstable	
73	Santuit Historic District	Santuit Historic District	November 10, 1987 (#87000319)	MA 28; 41°38′16″N 70°27′04″W	Barnstable	
74	Santuit Post Office	Santuit Post Office	November 10, 1987 (#87000309)	Main St. 41°38′06″N 70°27′01″W	Barnstable	
75	Matthias Smith House	Matthias Smith House	March 13, 1987 (#87000240)	375 Cedar St. 41°42′23″N 70°23′36″W	Barnstable	
76	Town Boundary Marker	Town Boundary Marker	September 18, 1987 (#87000269)	Race Ln.at Sandwich town line 41°41′11″N 70°26′12″W	Barnstable	
77	Town Line Boundary Marker	Town Line Boundary Marker	September 18, 1987 (#87000242)	Great Hill Rd. 41°43′19″N 70°24′04″W	Barnstable	
78	Town Line Boundary Marker	Town Line Boundary Marker	September 18, 1987 (#87000243)	410 High St. 41°43′19″N 70°24′04″W	Barnstable	
79	U.S. Customshouse	U.S. Customshouse	November 12, 1975 (#75000239)	Cobbs Hill, MA 6A; 41°42′01″N 70°17′57″W	Barnstable	
80	Barzillai Weeks House	Barzillai Weeks House	March 13, 1987 (#87000241)	313 High St. 41°43′15″N 70°23′59″W	Barnstable	
81	West Barnstable Village-Meetinghouse Way Historic District	West Barnstable Village-Meetinghouse Way Historic District	November 10, 1987 (#87000255)	Meetinghouse Way from County Rd. to Meetinghouse; 41°42′10″N 70°22′45″W	Barnstable	
82	Josiah B. Whitman House	Josiah B. Whitman House	March 13, 1987 (#87000236)	210 Maple St. 41°42′31″N 70°23′21″W	Barnstable	
83	Wianno Club	Wianno Club	March 2, 1979 (#79000325)	Seaview Ave. 41°36′58″N 70°22′17″W	Osterville	
84	Wianno Historic District	Wianno Historic District	November 10, 1987 (#87000316)	Roughly E. Bay Rd., Wianno and Sea View Aves. between Nantucket Sound and Crystal Lake; 41°37′03″N 70°22′24″W	Barnstable	
85	Witch (catboat)	Witch (catboat)	June 18, 2008 (#08000533)	155 West Bay Rd. 41°37′28″N 70°23′14″W	Osterville	
86	Yarmouth Camp Ground Historic District	Yarmouth Camp Ground Historic District	August 28, 1990 (#90001244)	South of mid-Cape Highway (U.S. Route 6) and roughly bounded by County Ave., Willow St., Wood Rd., and Camp Ground Pond; 41°40′59″N 70°15′44″W	Barnstable and Yarmouth	

== Former listings ==
	Name on the Register	Image	Date listed	Date removed	Location	City or town	Description
1	Barnstable Fair Hall	Barnstable Fair Hall	March 7, 1979 (#80000436)	June 12, 1980	3512 Main St.	Barnstable	Destroyed by fire on April 2, 1980.

== See also ==
- National Register of Historic Places listings in Barnstable County, Massachusetts
- List of National Historic Landmarks in Massachusetts
