= Benjamin Baker Jr. House =

Historic house in Massachusetts, United States

- U.S. National Register of Historic Places
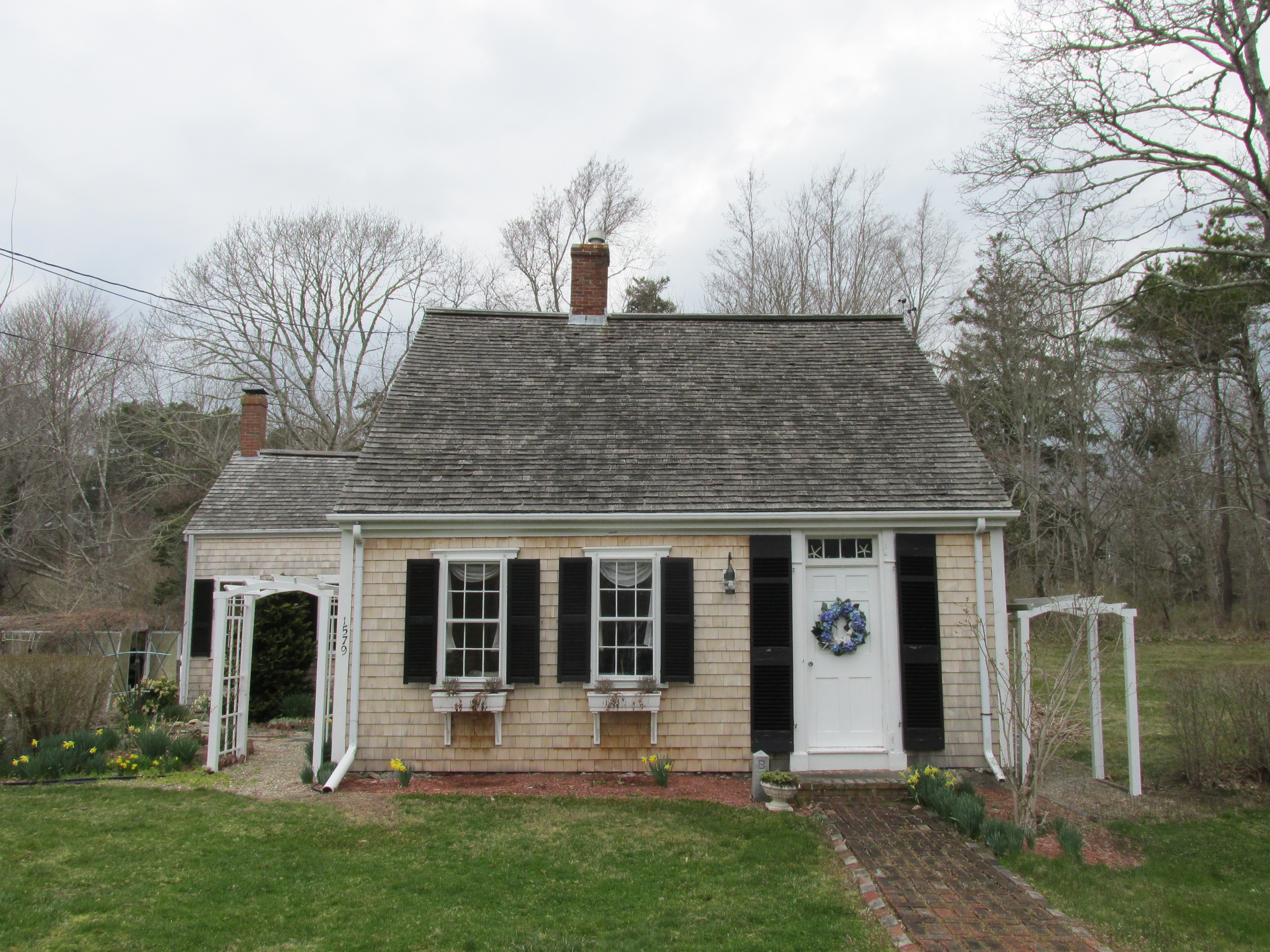

- Location within Cape Cod Location within Massachusetts Location within the United States
- Location: 1579 Hyannis Road, Barnstable, Massachusetts
- Coordinates: 41°41′42″N 70°18′12″W
- Area: 1.5 acres (0.61 ha)
- Built: 1828
- Architectural style: Federal
- MPS: Barnstable MRA
- NRHP reference No.: 87000352
- Added to NRHP: November 10, 1987

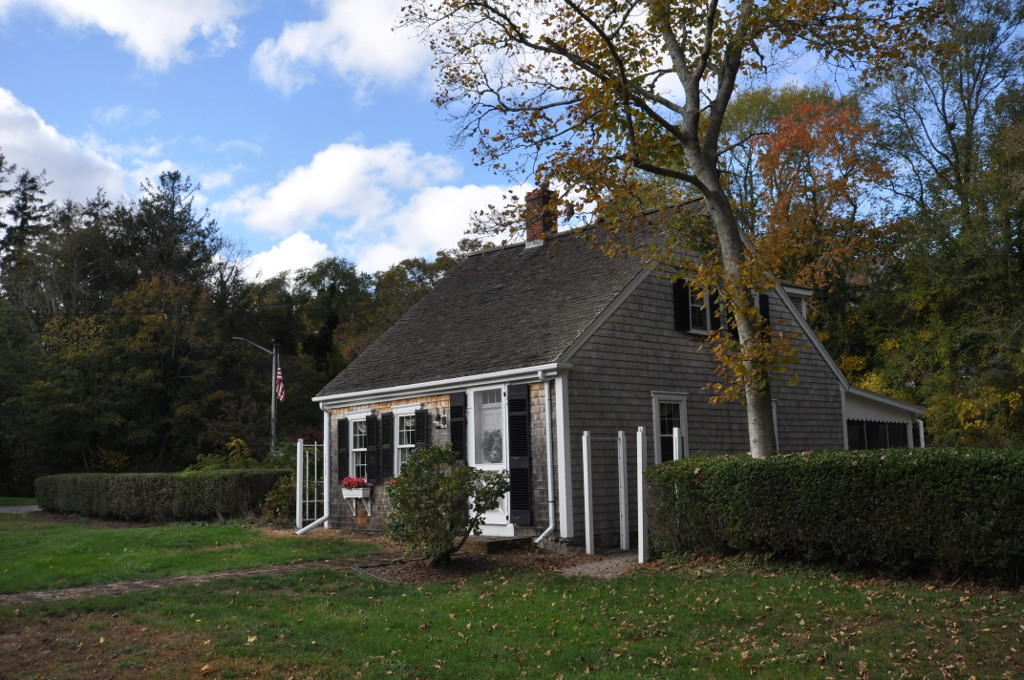
Benjamin Baker Jr. House

The Benjamin Baker Jr. House is a historic house at 1579 Hyannis Road in Barnstable, Massachusetts. Built about 1828, it is a well-preserved example of a Federal period "half Cape". It was listed on the National Register of Historic Places in 1987.

== Description and history ==
The Benjamin Baker Jr. House stands in what is now a rural-residential area of central northern Barnstable, on the west side of Hyannis Road just south of its junction with Maushop Avenue. It is a simple single story Federal style cottage, 3 bays wide, with a side gable roof and wood shingle siding. Its front door, in the right-side bay, is flanked by pilasters and topped by a transom window. The chimney rises near the center of the house behind the left bay. A similar three-bay addition is attached at the left rear corner. The interior of the cottage has been modernized.

In 1826 and 1827, Benjamin Baker Jr., a caulker, purchased this parcel of land from John Baker, a housewright, on what was then known as "Baker's Lane" named for Nathaniel Baker, an early grantee of land in the area. This house was probably built soon afterward. Baker died in 1840 with an insolvent estate; this property was eventually sold to Simeon Doane, a mariner. The house is one of six surviving Federal period half-Capes in Barnstable.

== See also ==
- Nathaniel Baker House
- National Register of Historic Places listings in Barnstable, Massachusetts
