= Building at 614 Main Street =

- U.S. National Register of Historic Places
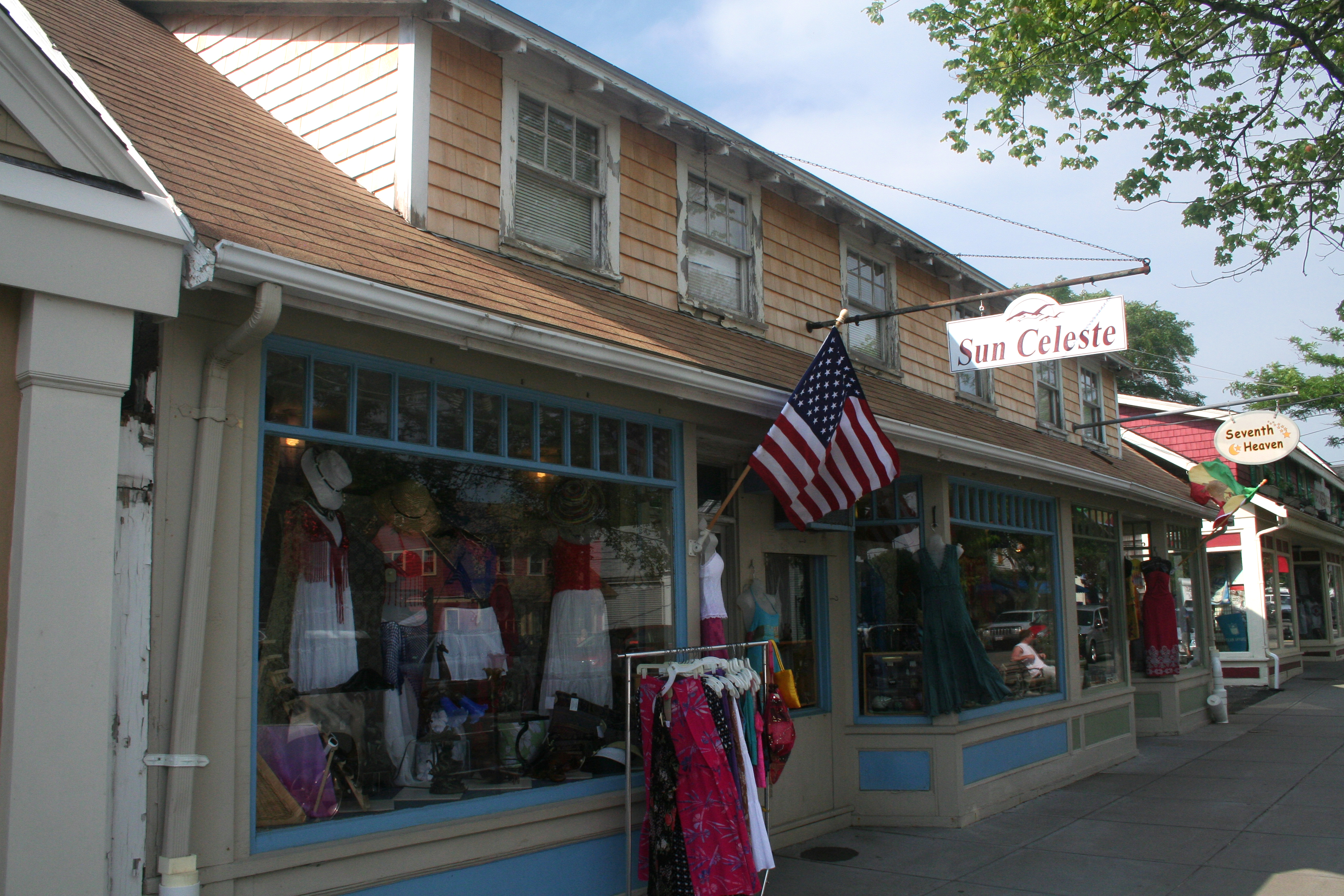

- Location within Cape Cod Location within Massachusetts Location within the United States
- Location: Barnstable, Massachusetts
- Coordinates: 41°38′56″N 70°17′28″W
- Built: 1910
- Architectural style: Bungalow/Craftsman
- MPS: Barnstable MRA
- NRHP reference No.: 87000285
- Added to NRHP: March 13, 1987

The building at 614 Main Street in Barnstable, Massachusetts is a modest commercial building built in 1910, during the area's main period of development as a commercial district. Stylistically, the single story wood-frame building is similar to 606 Main Street, although it has more obvious Arts and Crafts features, including exposed rafters. The building has a gable roof, whose front slope includes a shed-roof dormer providing access to storage space above the stores.

The building was listed on the National Register of Historic Places in 1987.

== See also ==
- National Register of Historic Places listings in Barnstable County, Massachusetts
