= Capt. Seth Baker Jr. House =

Historic house in Massachusetts, United States

- U.S. National Register of Historic Places
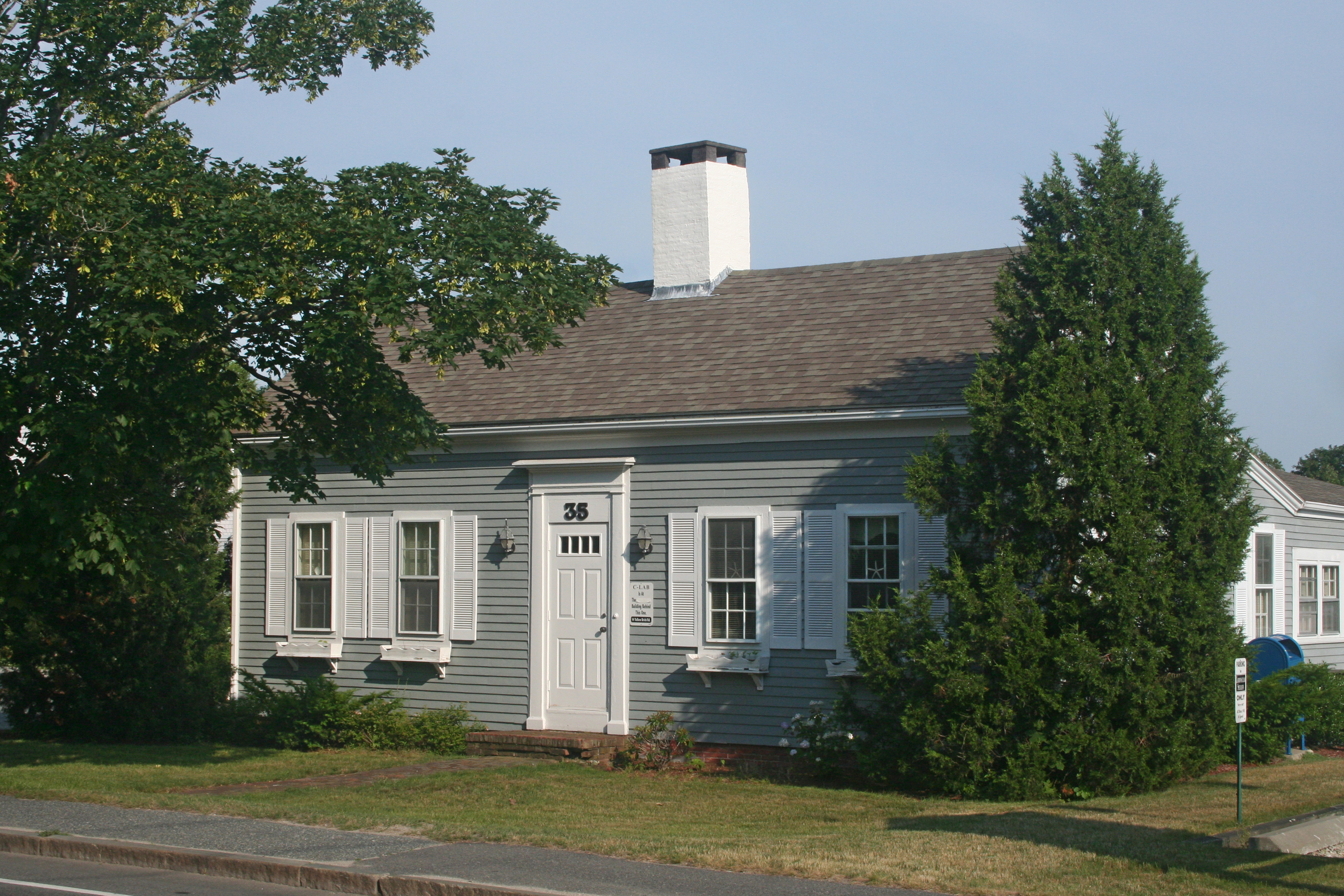

- Location within Cape Cod Location within Massachusetts Location within the United States
- Location: 35 Main St., Barnstable, Massachusetts
- Coordinates: 41°39′22″N 70°16′22″W
- Built: 1850
- Architectural style: Greek Revival, Federal
- MPS: Barnstable MRA
- NRHP reference No.: 87000299
- Added to NRHP: September 18, 1987

The Capt. Seth Baker Jr. House is a historic house in Barnstable, Massachusetts, USA. Built about 1850, it is a late example of transitional Federal-Greek Revival architecture, and a somewhat modest house built for a ship's captain. It was listed on the National Register of Historic Places in 1987.

== Description and history ==
The Captain Seth Baker Jr. House stands in a busy commercial area of the village of Hyannis, on the south side of Main Street between Parkway Place and Bayview Street. It is a 1 1/2-story wood-frame structure, with a side-gable roof, central chimney, and clapboarded exterior. Its front facade is five bays wide, with a central entrance framed by Federal style slender pilasters, tall frieze, and projecting cornice. Greek Revival features include its slightly lower window placement and the clapboarded exterior. A modern single-story addition extends to the rear.

The house was built about 1850, and its survival in what is now a commercial area is a reminder of the area's early history. It was built by Seth Baker, Jr., a deep-sea ship's captain. The house's modest features are a contrast to the more elaborate houses often built by ship's captains in the area, indicating that there was a wide range of economic situations in that profession. The house now houses professional offices.

== See also ==
- National Register of Historic Places listings in Barnstable, Massachusetts
