= Barnstable Fair Hall =

- Formerly listed on the U.S. National Register of Historic Places
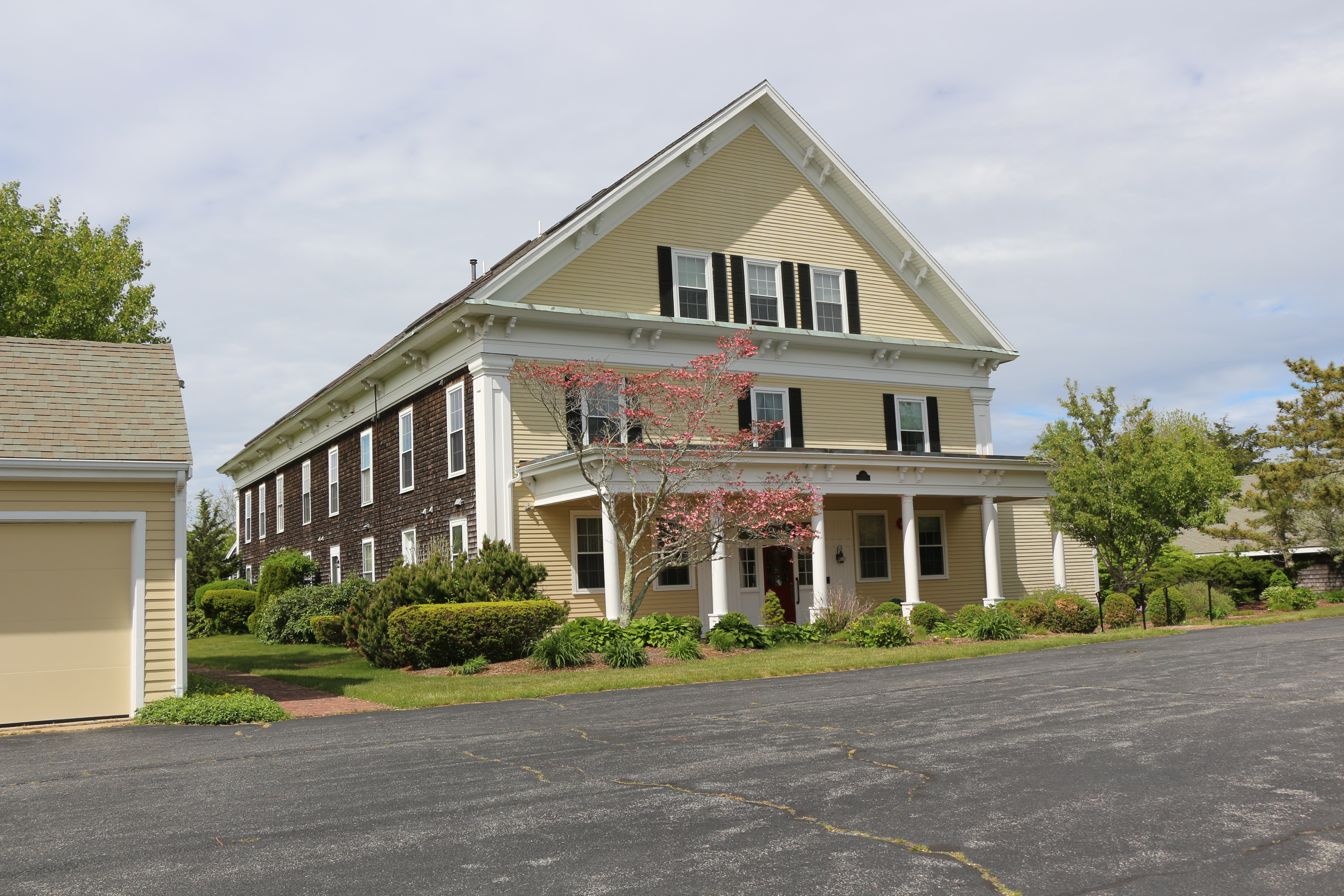
- Site of the building

- Location within Massachusetts
- Location: 3512 Main St, Barnstable, Massachusetts
- Coordinates: 41°42′5.75″N 70°17′36.33″W
- NRHP reference No.: 80000436

Significant dates
- Added to NRHP: March 7, 1979
- Removed from NRHP: June 12, 1980

The Barnstable Fair Hall or Barnstable Agricultural Hall was an exhibition hall located in Barnstable, Massachusetts that was listed on the National Register of Historic Places on March 7, 1979. It was leveled by fire in the early morning of April 2, 1980. In the early 1990s, the structure was re-built as a condominium complex. In 1856 and 1857, land around the present building was given and sold to the Agricultural Society for use as a fairground. Total acreage of the property eventually exceeded twenty acres and extended as far back as the Maraspin Creek, a tidal stream. In 1857- 1858 a building "for exhibition purposes and a hall for public meetings" was built on the site of the present building. In February 1862, this first fair hall was destroyed by a gale, resulting in the formation of a building committee in April 1862 and the construction of the new structure between June 17 and October 14, 1862. Money for building costs came from private subscription, to which William Sturgis, a Boston merchant and native of Barnstable, was the major donor. Praised as being "superior in taste to the old" hall, the new Fair Hall was dedicated at the Barnstable County Fair of 1862 (October 15) and served as the exhibition hall for all subsequent annual fairs until 1931 when the fair ceased to be held regularly. The fair is now held on an annual basis in Falmouth. During the period in which this property served as a fairground, there were additional shed and storage buildings to the north and east of the Fair Hall, as well as a track for trotting races, baseball diamond and grandstand, all of which have been removed. In addition to the usual exhibits of livestock and agricultural products, turn-of-the century fairs had vaudeville performances, balloonists, and other entertainments.

== See also ==
- National Register of Historic Places listings in Barnstable, Massachusetts
