= Matthias Smith House =

Historic house in Massachusetts, United States

- U.S. National Register of Historic Places
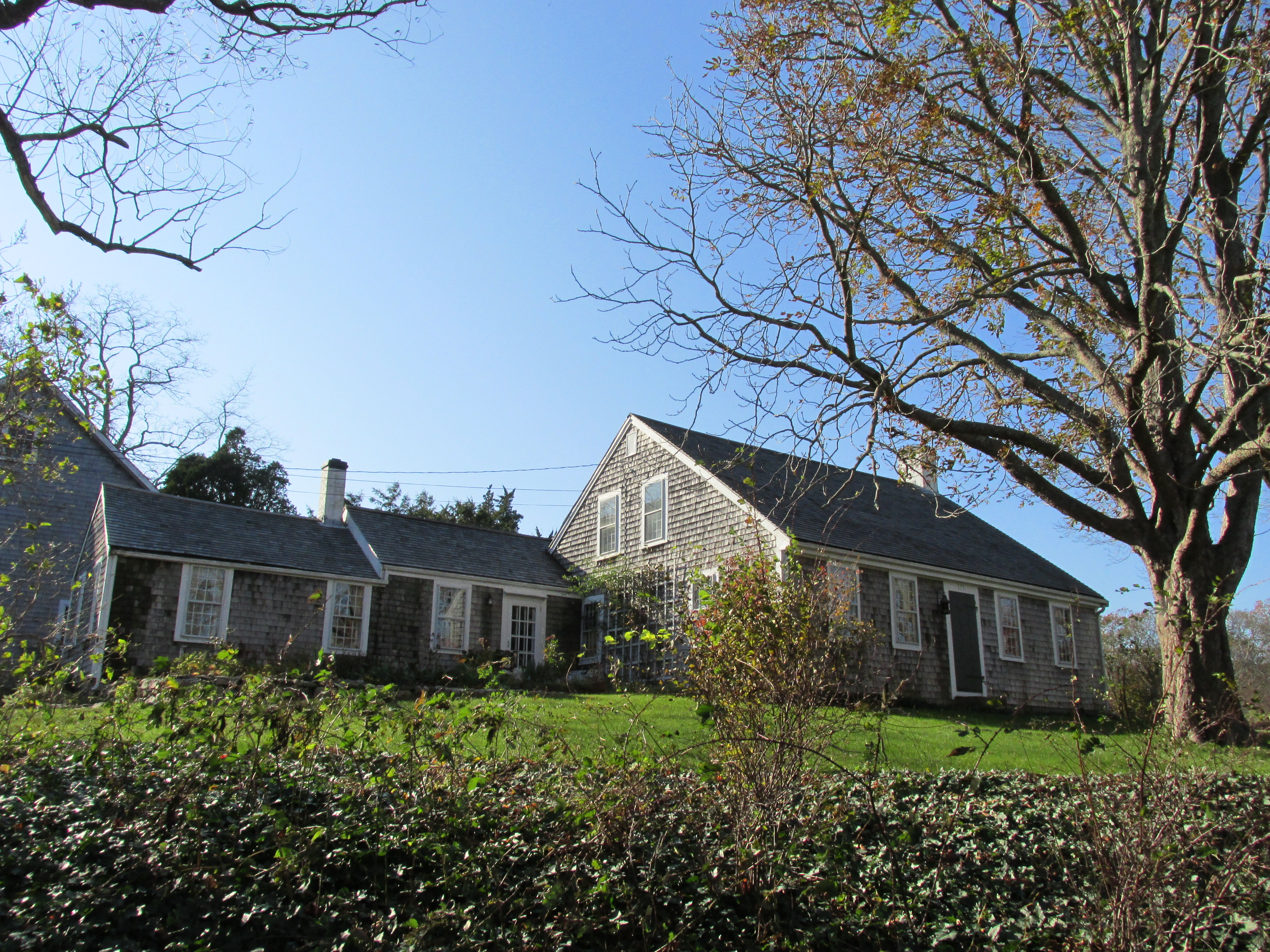

- Location within Cape Cod Location within Massachusetts Location within the United States
- Location: 375 Cedar St., Barnstable, Massachusetts
- Coordinates: 41°42′23″N 70°23′36″W
- Built: 1760
- MPS: Barnstable MRA
- NRHP reference No.: 87000240
- Added to NRHP: March 13, 1987

The Matthias Smith House is a historic house at 375 Cedar Street in Barnstable, Massachusetts. The 1 1/2-story Cape style wood-frame house was built c. 1760 by Matthias Smith, and was the center of a working farm for two centuries. It is five bays wide, with a central entry and central chimney, with two single-story ells added to its left. The entry is topped by a small transom window with two bullseye lights. The house is a well-preserved example of a mid-18th century farmhouse; the property includes a number of agricultural outbuildings, including a barn, toolshed, and chicken houses.

The property was listed on the National Register of Historic Places in 1987.

== See also ==
- National Register of Historic Places listings in Barnstable County, Massachusetts
