= Benomi and Barnabas Crocker House =

Historic house in Massachusetts, United States

- U.S. National Register of Historic Places
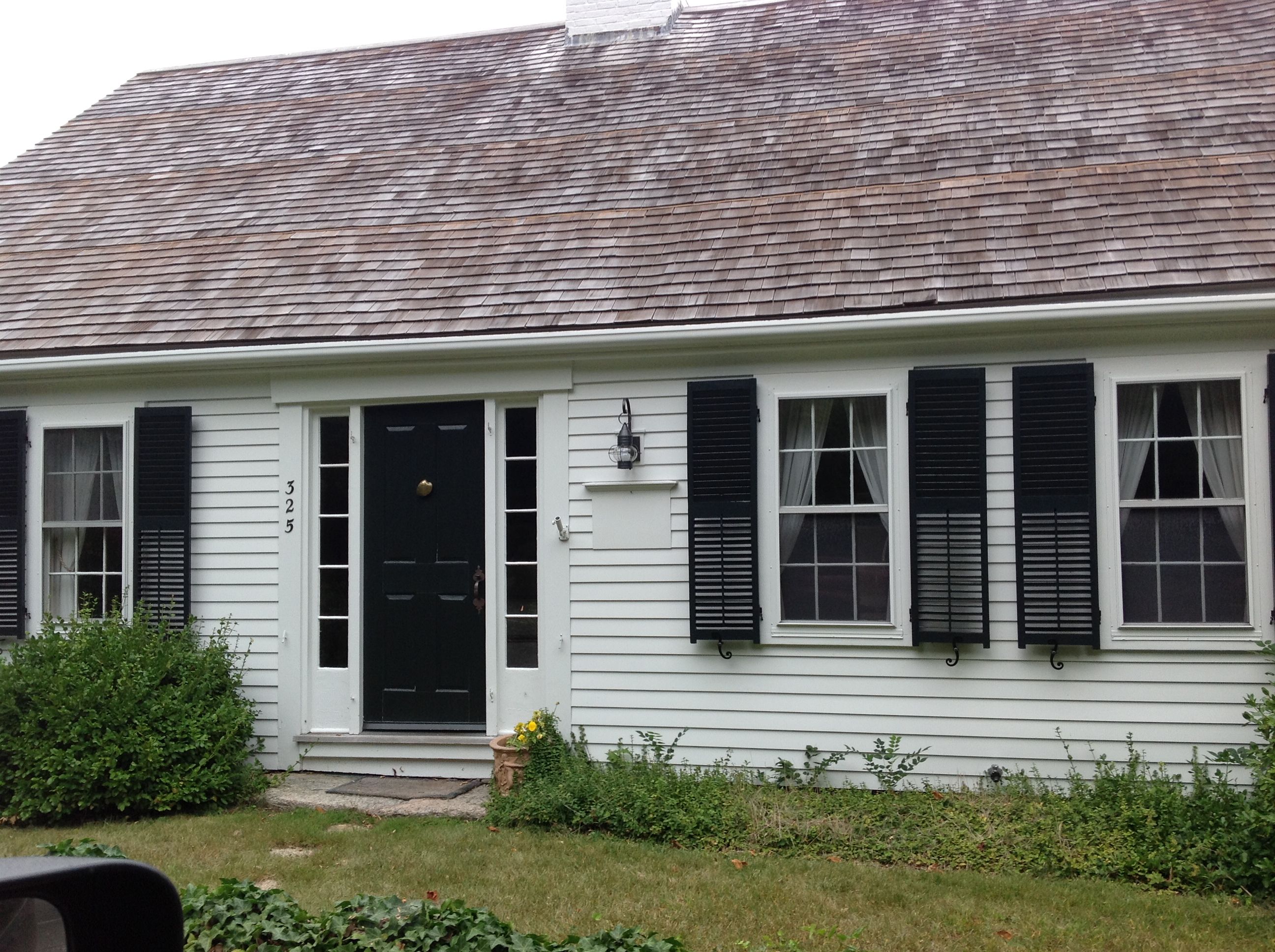

- Location within Cape Cod Location within Massachusetts Location within the United States
- Location: 325 Willow Street, Barnstable, Massachusetts
- Coordinates: 41°42′18″N 70°23′10″W
- Built: 1790
- Architectural style: Federal
- MPS: Barnstable MRA
- NRHP reference No.: 87000216
- Added to NRHP: March 13, 1987

The Benomi and Barnabas Crocker House is a historic house located in Barnstable, Massachusetts.

== Description and history ==
The 1 1/2-story wood-frame house was built in 1790 as a three-bay Cape style house; it was extended to five bays in 1843. It was owned by members of the Crocker family, one of the first to settle the area, until 1925. It is surmised by local historians that elements of the "Old Stone Fort", which was demolished in 1815, may have been used in the construction of the house.

The house was listed on the National Register of Historic Places on March 13, 1987.

== See also ==
- National Register of Historic Places listings in Barnstable County, Massachusetts
