= Nelson Rhodehouse House =

Historic house in Massachusetts, United States

- U.S. National Register of Historic Places
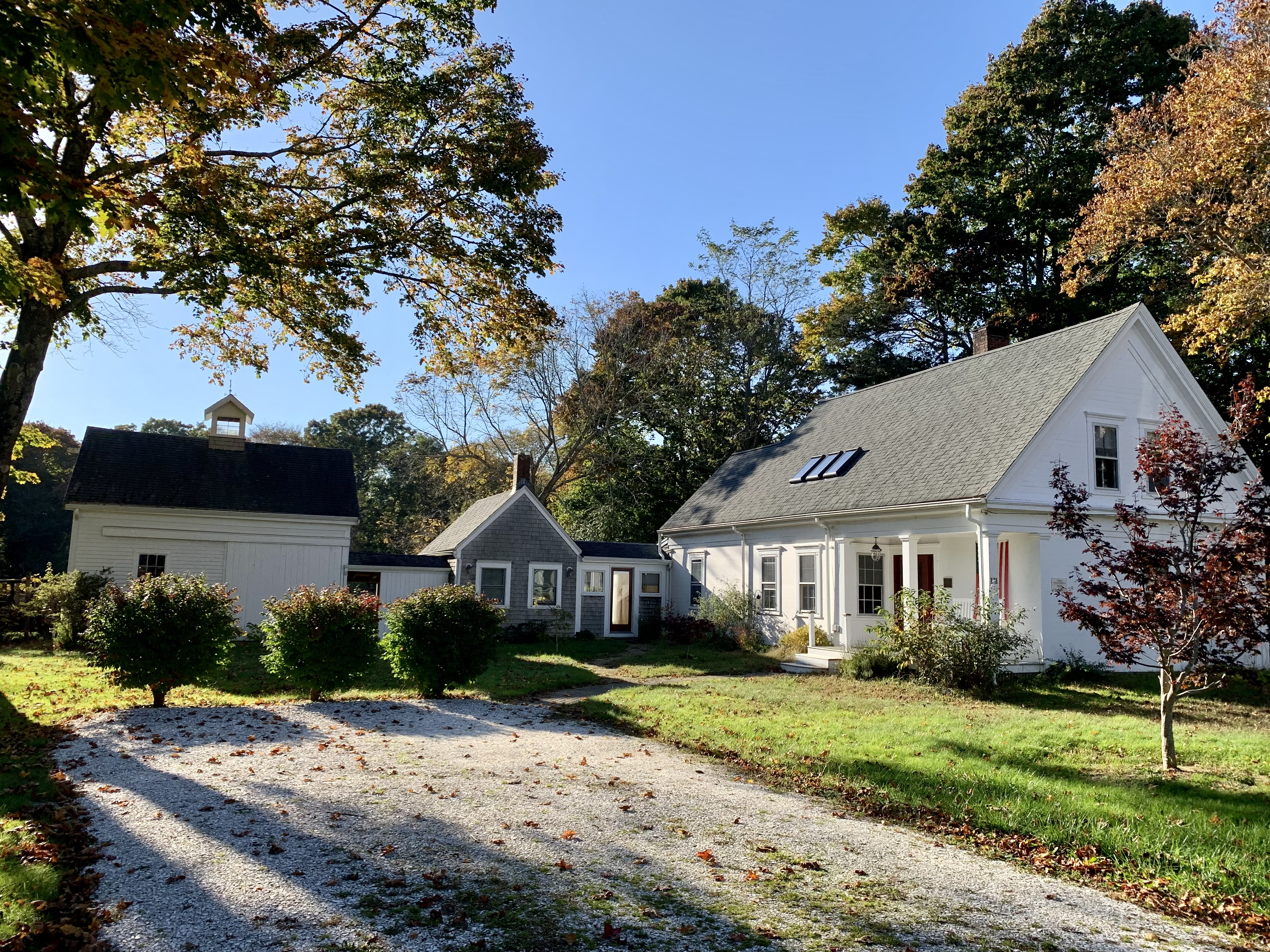
- View from Main Street

- Location within Cape Cod Location within Massachusetts Location within the United States
- Location: 131 Main Street, Barnstable, Massachusetts
- Coordinates: 41°38′2″N 70°26′59″W
- Built: 1858
- Architect: Charles Baxter, Housewright
- Architectural style: Greek Revival
- MPS: Barnstable MRA
- NRHP reference No.: 87000308
- Added to NRHP: March 13, 1987

The Nelson Rhodehouse House is a historic house located in the Cotuit village of Barnstable, Massachusetts.

== Description and history ==
The 1 1/2-story wood-frame house was built c. 1858 by Charles Baxter, a housewright, who sold it soon thereafter to Nelson Rhodehouse, a mariner. The house is a fine example of Greek Revival style, with a distinctive side entrance located in a porch that is recessed under the gable. The house is finished in flushboarding, giving the appearance of masonry, with corner pilasters.

The house was listed on the National Register of Historic Places on March 13, 1987.

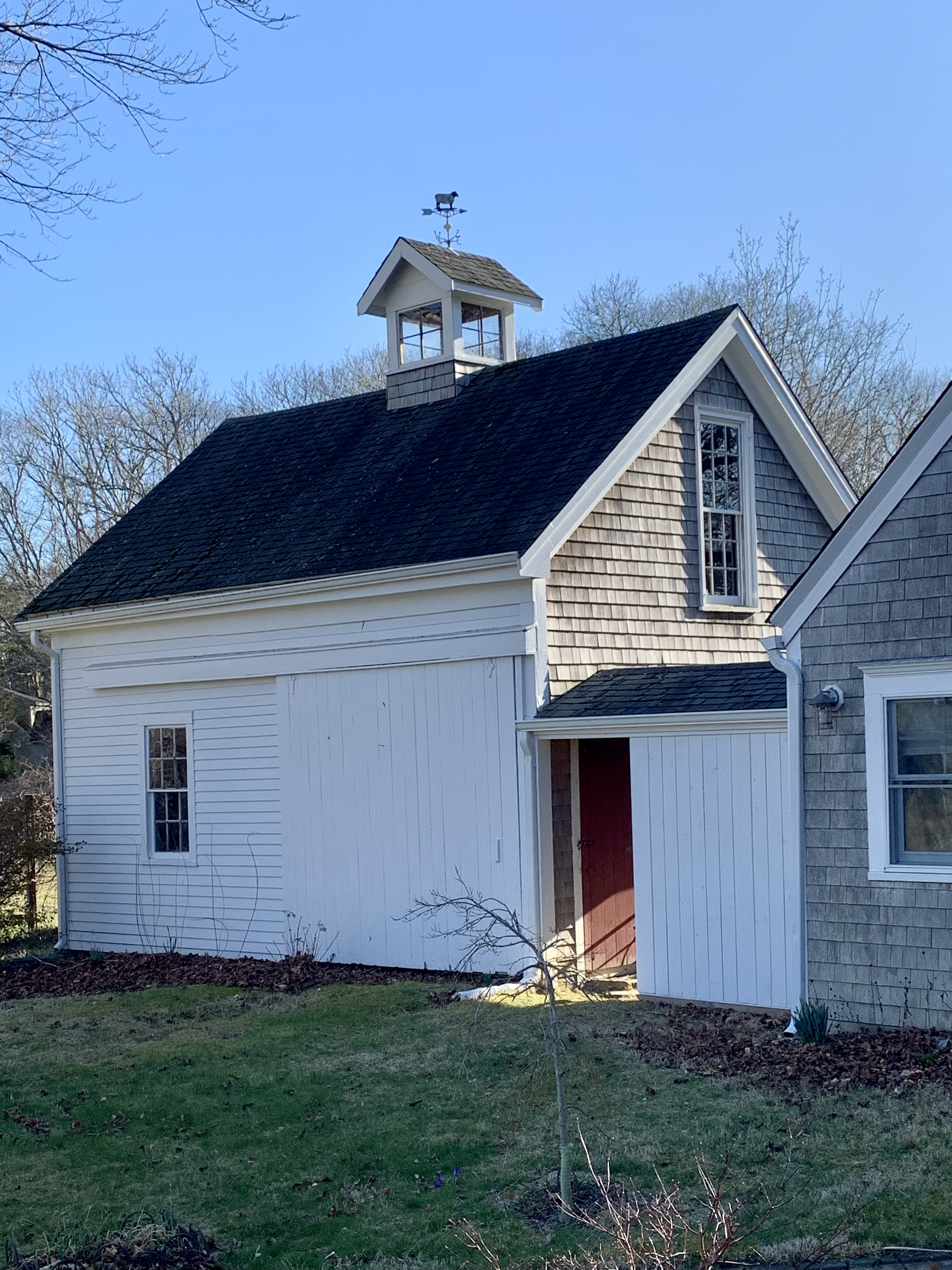
View of Barn from Main Street

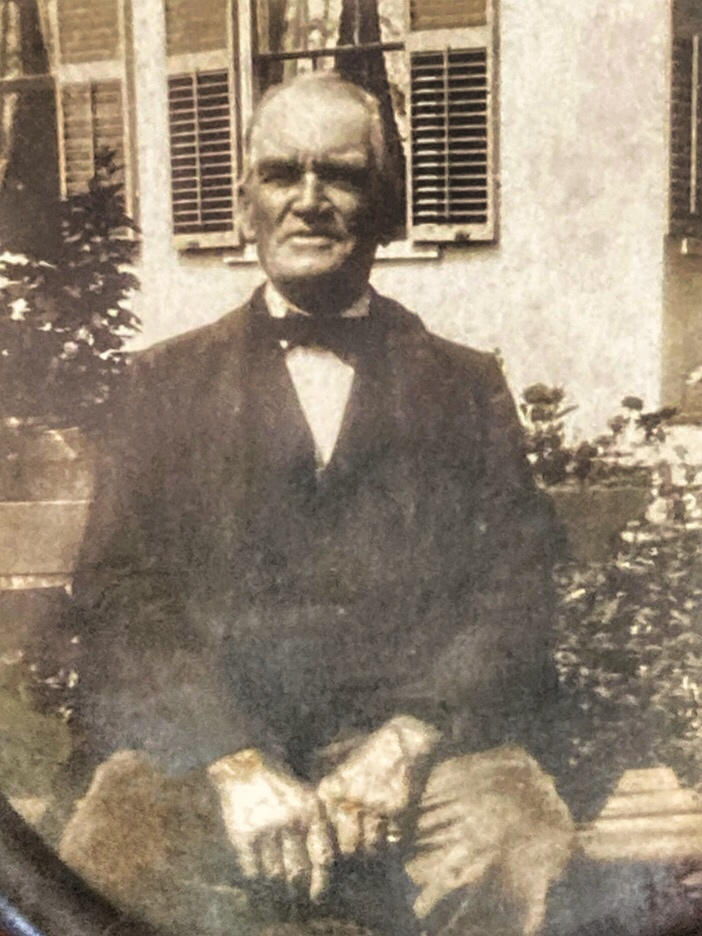
Photo of Captain Nelson Rhodehouse, c. 1900

== See also ==
- National Register of Historic Places listings in Barnstable County, Massachusetts
