= Ebenezer Crocker Jr. House =

Historic house in Massachusetts, United States

- U.S. National Register of Historic Places
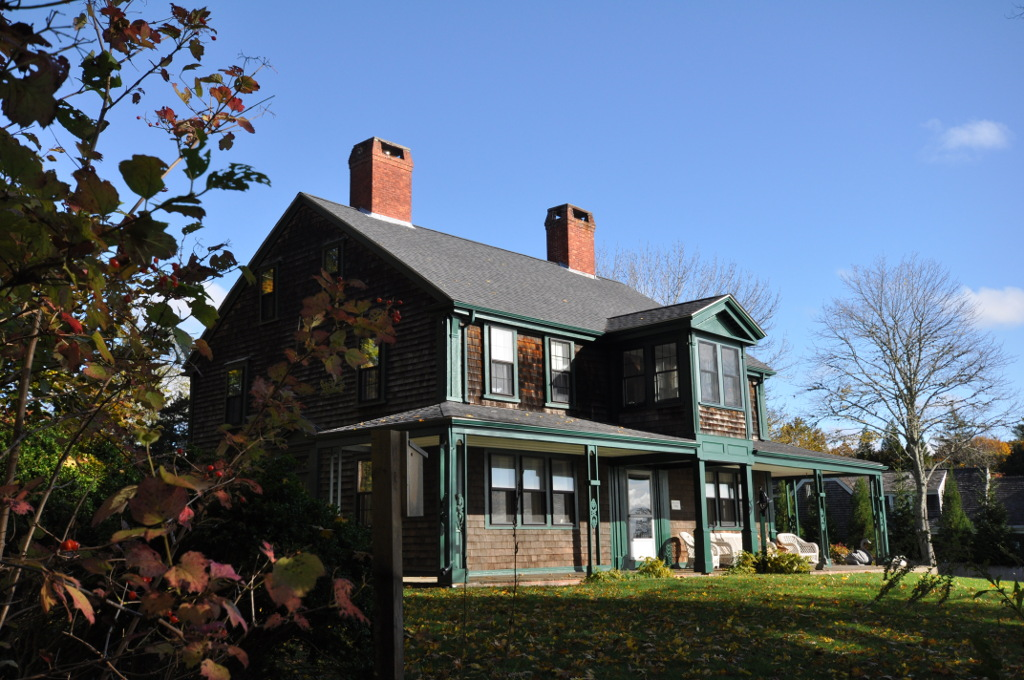

- Location within Cape Cod Location within Massachusetts Location within the United States
- Location: 49 Putnam Ave., Barnstable, Massachusetts
- Coordinates: 41°37′17″N 70°26′3″W
- Area: 4.2 acres (1.7 ha)
- Built: 1783
- Architectural style: Georgian
- MPS: Barnstable MRA
- NRHP reference No.: 87000323
- Added to NRHP: November 10, 1987

The Ebenezer Crocker Jr. House is a historic house located in Barnstable, Massachusetts.

== Description and history ==
Built in 1783, it is the oldest house currently standing in Cotuit village. It is a 2 1/2-story wood-frame structure, with a five bay facade. It has corner pilasters, and is extended by two ells, one of which may be older than the main block. The house has a long association with the locally prominent Crocker family, and is accompanied by well-preserved outbuildings.

The house was listed on the National Register of Historic Places on November 10, 1987.

== See also ==
- National Register of Historic Places listings in Barnstable County, Massachusetts
