= Building at 237–239 Main Street =

- U.S. National Register of Historic Places
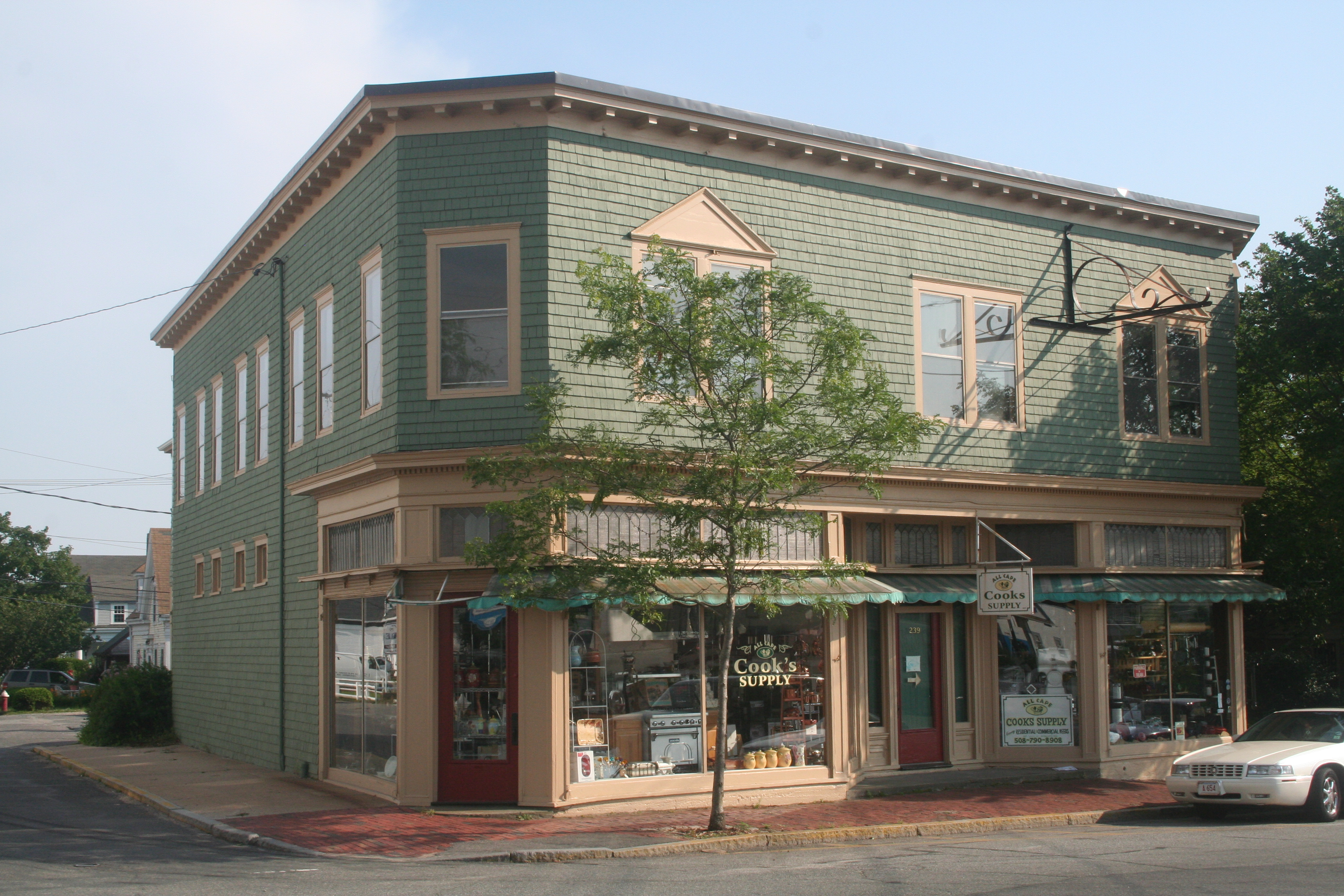

- Location within Cape Cod Location within Massachusetts Location within the United States
- Location: 237–239 Main Street, Barnstable, Massachusetts
- Coordinates: 41°39′16″N 70°16′49″W
- Built: 1910
- Architectural style: Queen Anne
- MPS: Barnstable MRA
- NRHP reference No.: 87000293
- Added to NRHP: March 13, 1987

237–239 Main Street is a historic commercial building located at the address of the same name in Barnstable, Massachusetts.

== Description and history ==
It is a two-story, wood-framed, Queen Anne style retail block which has retained even its original storefronts. It has a narrow cornice with plain brackets, and some second-floor windows are paired and headed by triangular pediments. It is notable for the survival without significant alterations, of even its storefronts, since its construction in 1910, and is one of a small number of surviving commercial buildings form that period in Hyannis.

The building was listed on the National Register of Historic Places on March 13, 1987.

== See also ==
- National Register of Historic Places listings in Barnstable County, Massachusetts
