= Harlow Homestead =

Historic house in Massachusetts, United States

- U.S. National Register of Historic Places
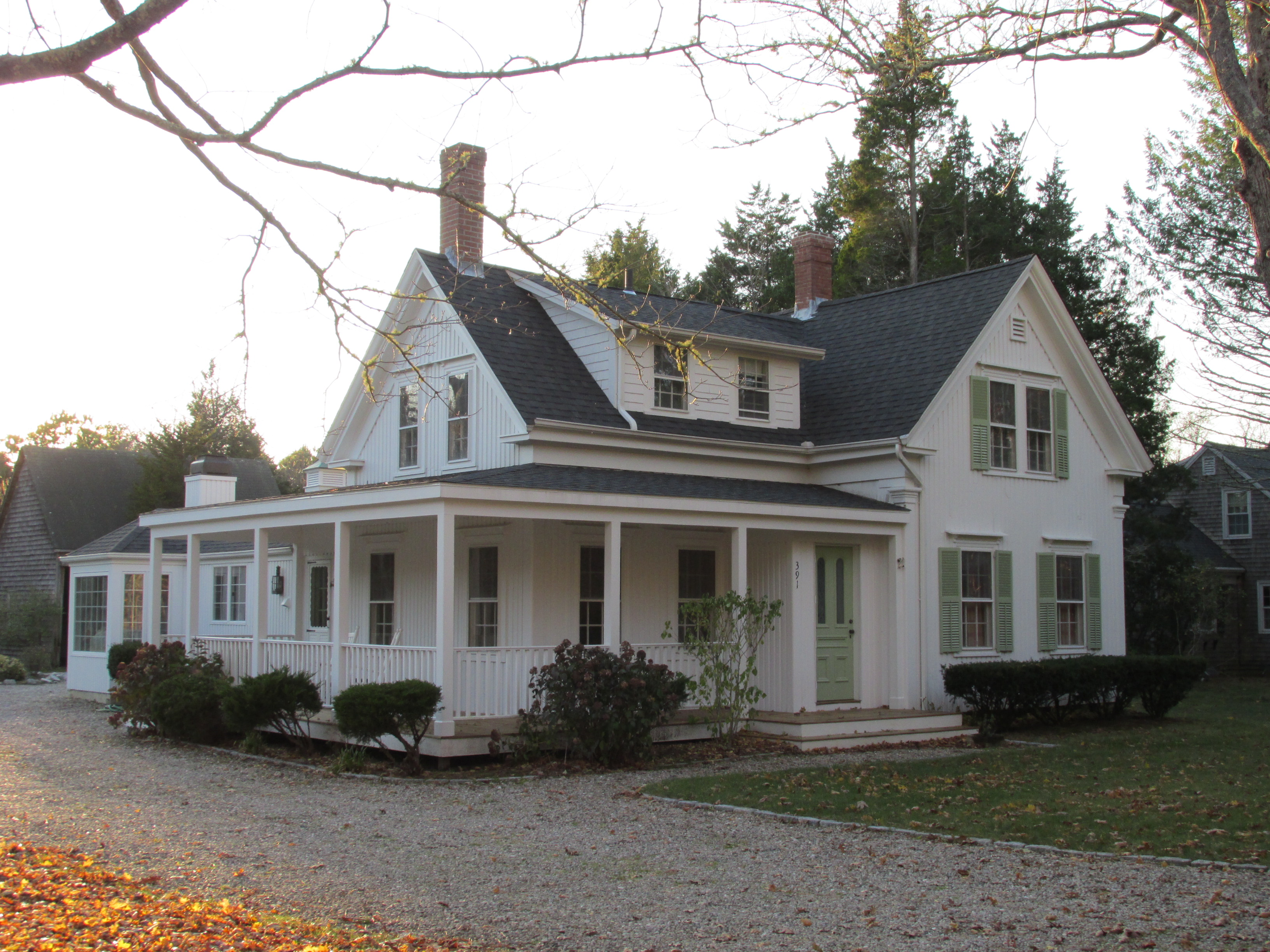

- Location within Cape Cod Location within Massachusetts Location within the United States
- Location: 391 Main Street, Barnstable, Massachusetts
- Coordinates: 41°37′42″N 70°26′35″W
- Built: 1878
- Architectural style: Greek Revival, Italianate
- MPS: Barnstable MRA
- NRHP reference No.: 87000324
- Added to NRHP: September 18, 1987

The Harlow Homestead is a historic house located in the Cotuit village of Barnstable, Massachusetts.

== Description and history ==
This 1 1/2-story wood-frame house was built c. 1878 by Elijah Harlow, member of a locally prominent family, and it is remained in his family since then. It is an L-shaped house with a rear extension. It is sheathed with narrow vertical boards (an Italianate element), and has corner pilasters and a wide entablature in the Greek Revival style. A porch wraps around two sides of the house.

The house was listed on the National Register of Historic Places on September 18, 1987.

== See also ==
- National Register of Historic Places listings in Barnstable County, Massachusetts
