= Building at 600 Main Street =

- U.S. National Register of Historic Places
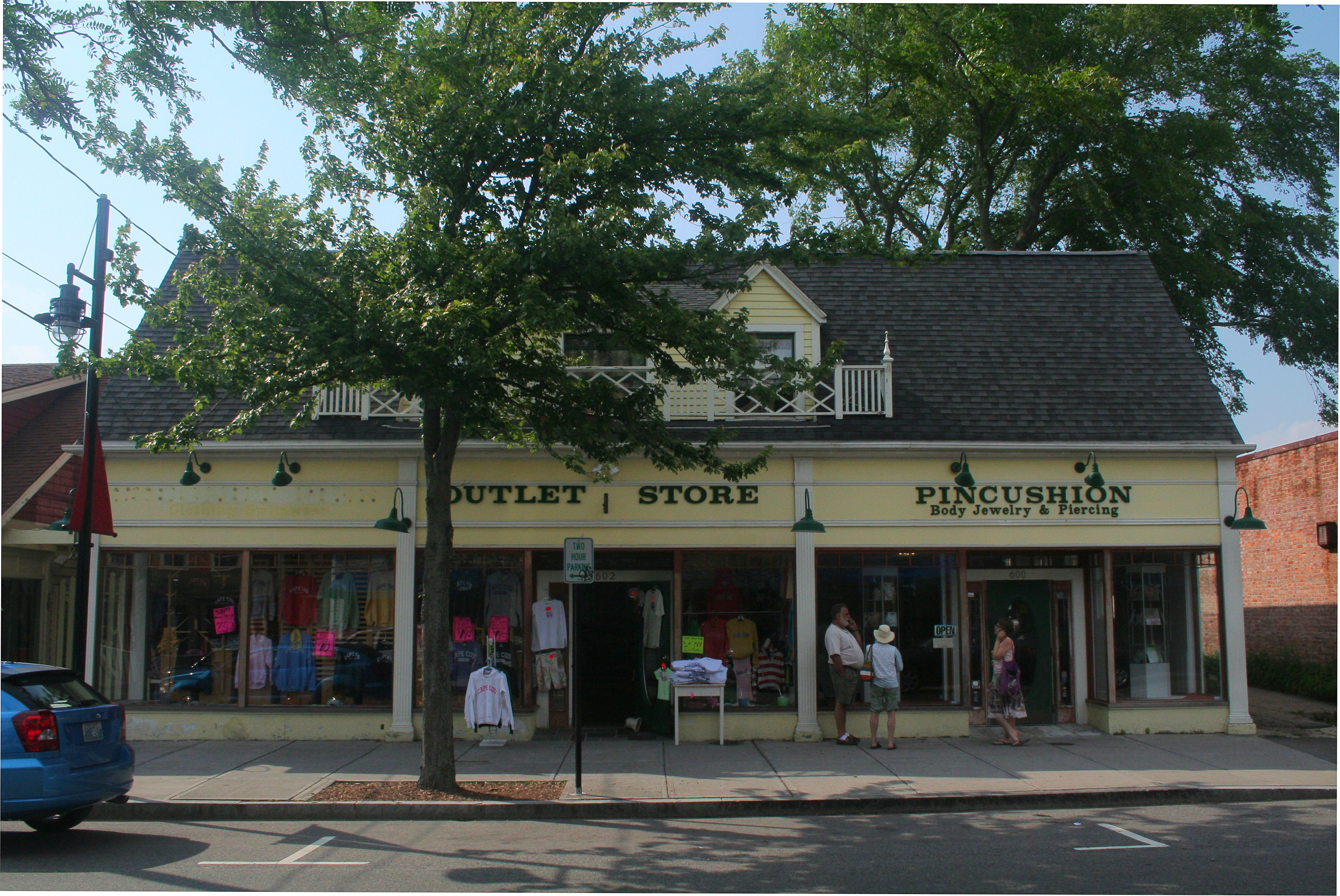

- Location within Cape Cod Location within Massachusetts Location within the United States
- Location: 600 Main Street, Barnstable, Massachusetts
- Coordinates: 41°38′56″N 70°17′28″W
- Built: 1920
- Architectural style: Colonial Revival
- MPS: Barnstable MRA
- NRHP reference No.: 87000286
- Added to NRHP: March 13, 1987

600 Main Street is a historic commercial building located in Barnstable, Massachusetts.

== Description and history ==
It is a 1 1/2-story, wood-framed building whose gable roof is pierced by a three-part dormer surrounded by a balustrade. The building, constructed in 1920, has retained almost all of its original details, more so than the nearly-identical building at 595 Main Street, which has not. The building is notable as a high quality local example of commercial Colonial Revival architecture, and is typical of the area's gradual transformation into a commercial area in the early 20th century.

The building was listed on the National Register of Historic Places on March 13, 1987.

== See also ==
- National Register of Historic Places listings in Barnstable County, Massachusetts
