= Nathaniel Baker House =

Historic house in Massachusetts, United States

- U.S. National Register of Historic Places
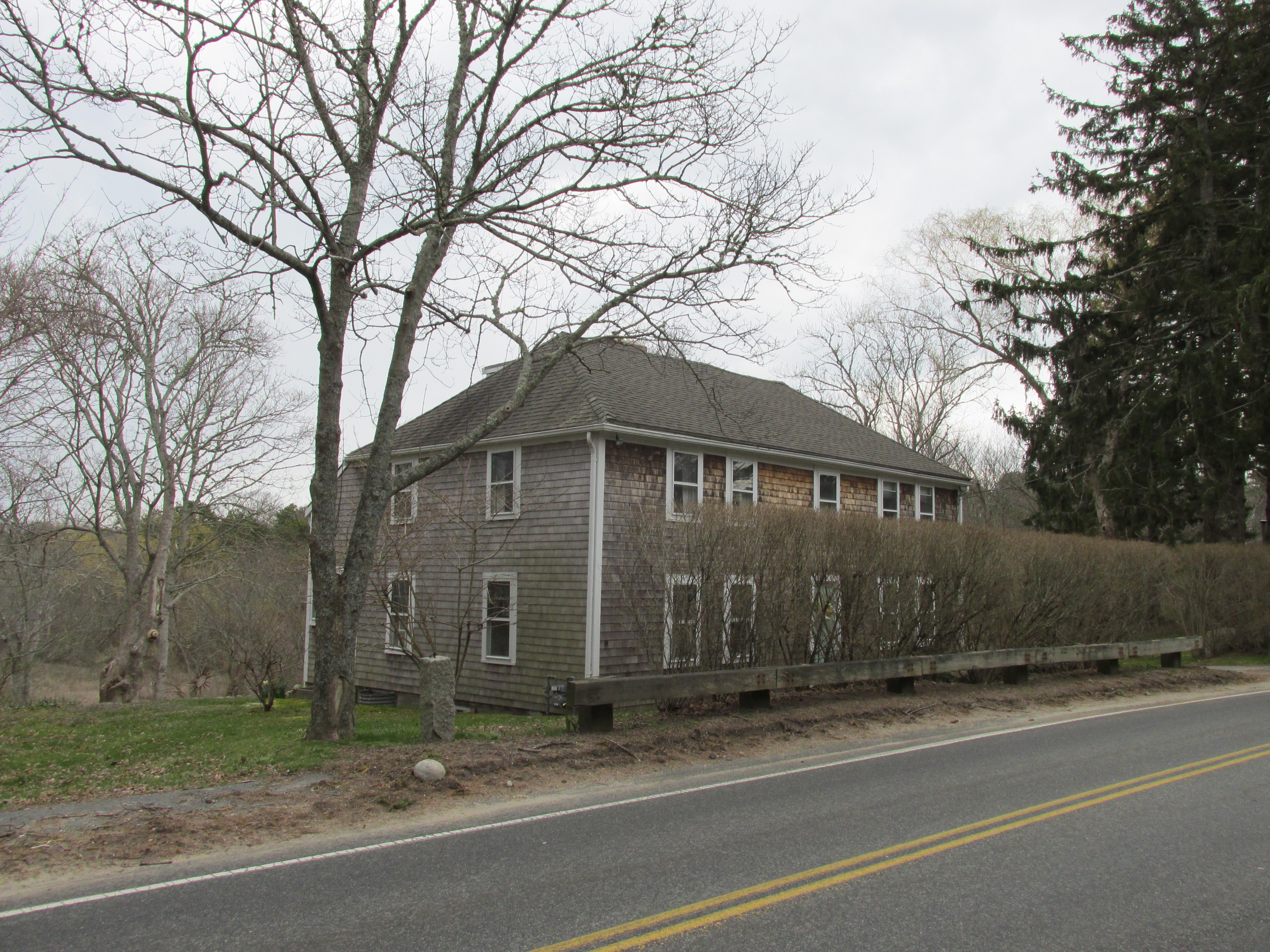
- Nathaniel Baker House

- Location within Cape Cod Location within Massachusetts Location within the United States
- Location: 1606 Hyannis Rd., Barnstable, Massachusetts
- Coordinates: 41°41′45″N 70°18′8″W
- Area: 1.5 acres (0.61 ha)
- Built: 1721
- Architectural style: Georgian
- MPS: Barnstable MRA
- NRHP reference No.: 87000229
- Added to NRHP: March 13, 1987

The Nathaniel Baker House is a historic house in Barnstable, Massachusetts. The house was probably built about 1721, and is a well-preserved example of an early Georgian hip-roofed house. It is also noted for its association with the locally prominent Baker family. It was listed on the National Register of Historic Places in 1987.

== Description and history ==
The Nathaniel Baker House stands in a rural residential area of central northern Barnstable, on the east side of Hyannis Road, roughly opposite its junction with Maushop Avenue. It is a two-story wood-frame structure, with a hip roof, central chimney, and wooden shingle exterior. It has unadorned trim, with plain cornerboards, window and door trim. The house follows a rectangular plan, with a two-story hip-roof ell attached to one side of the rear.

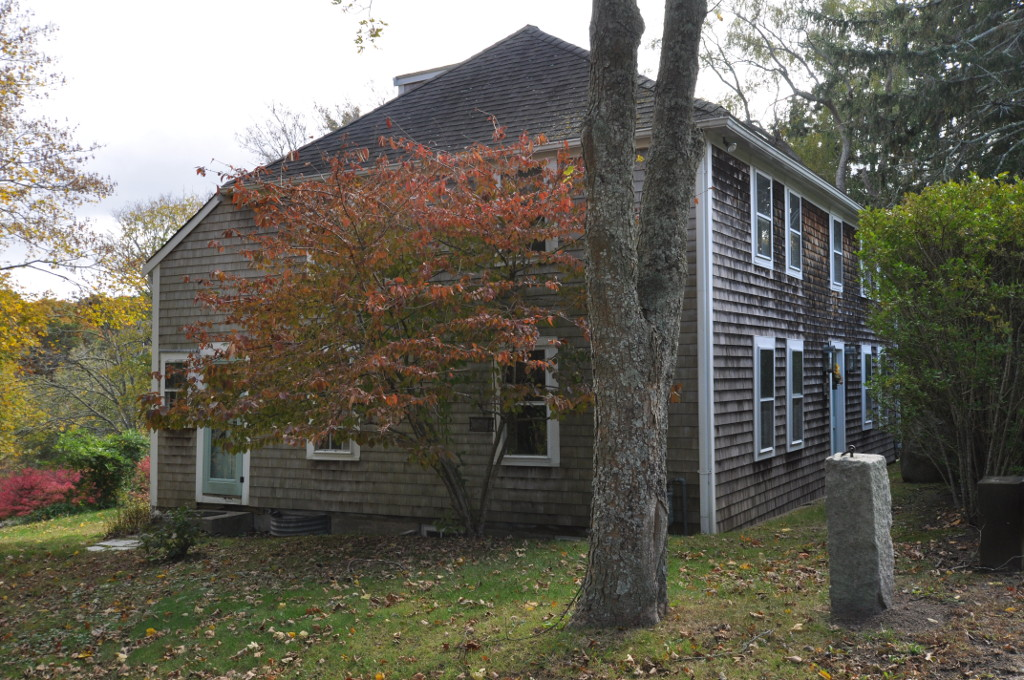
Nathaniel Baker House

The house was built about 1721 for Nathaniel Baker IV, possibly by his father Nathaniel Baker III, as a gift at the time of his wedding. Documentary sources support this general timeline, but there is some evidence that part of the house may be older. In 1778, Baker divided the house in two, deeding one half to his two daughters while he occupied the other half. He died in 1791, with an insolvent estate. The house was returned to single-family use in 1926. The house is one of six surviving Georgian five-bay houses in Barnstable.

== See also ==
- National Register of Historic Places listings in Barnstable, Massachusetts
