= Blish-Garret House =

Historic house in Massachusetts, United States

- U.S. National Register of Historic Places
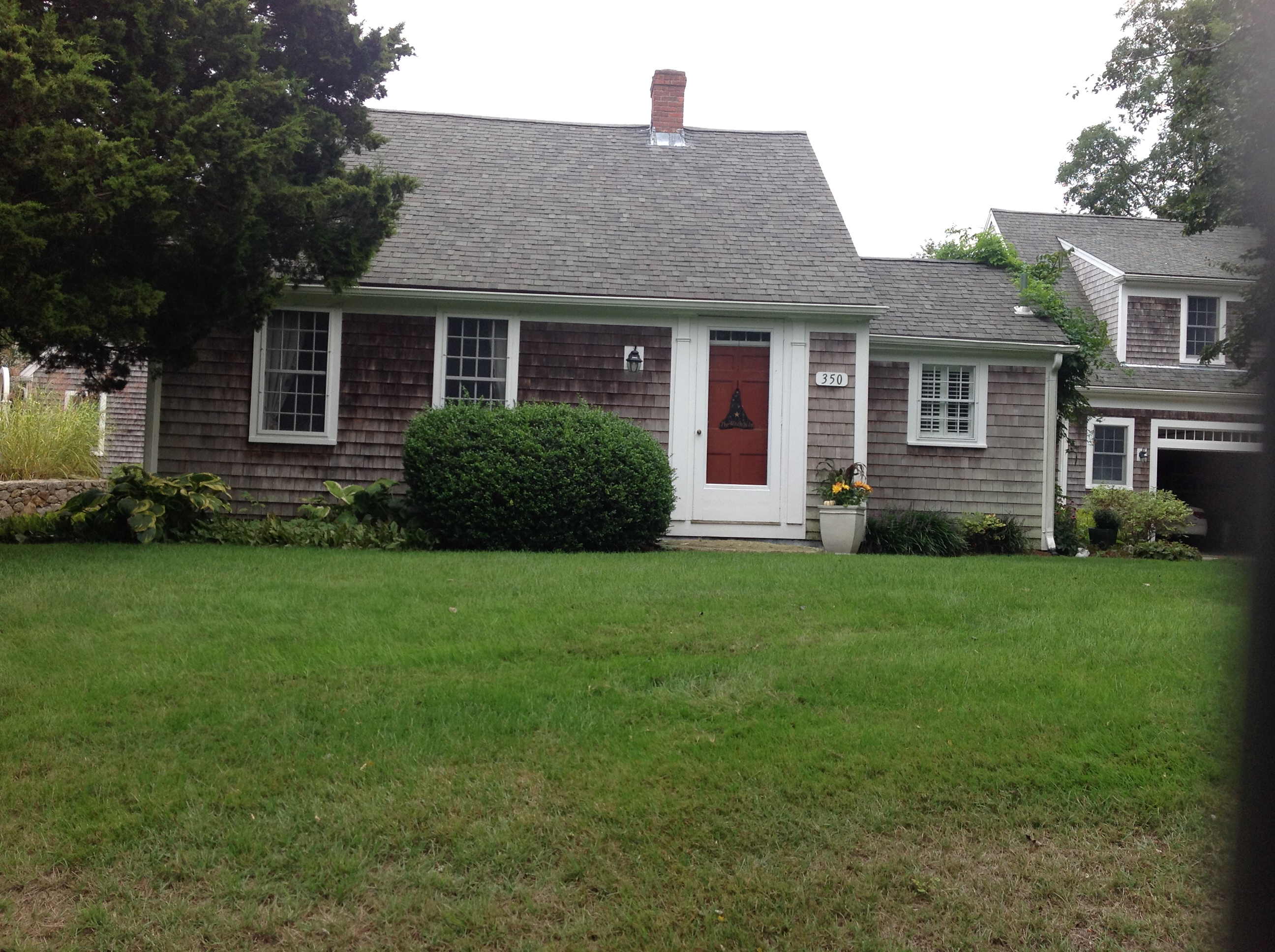

- Location within Cape Cod Location within Massachusetts Location within the United States
- Location: 350 Plum Street, Barnstable, Massachusetts
- Coordinates: 41°41′41″N 70°21′21″W
- Built: 1760
- Architectural style: Georgian
- MPS: Barnstable MRA
- NRHP reference No.: 87000327
- Added to NRHP: March 13, 1987

The Blish-Garret House is a historic house located in Barnstable, Massachusetts.

== Description and history ==
This 1 1/2-story Cape style house was built c. 1760, and is a rare well-preserved instance of a Georgian colonial period Cape. It is slightly unusual in that it is a half-house, only three bays wide, which was never widened to the typical five bays. The main entry is simply framed, with a transom window. The first documented owner was Jonathan Blish; it was later owned by Andrew Garrett, for whom Garrett Pond is named.

The house was listed on the National Register of Historic Places in 1987.

== See also ==
- National Register of Historic Places listings in Barnstable County, Massachusetts
