= Canary-Hartnett House =

Historic house in Massachusetts, United States

- U.S. National Register of Historic Places
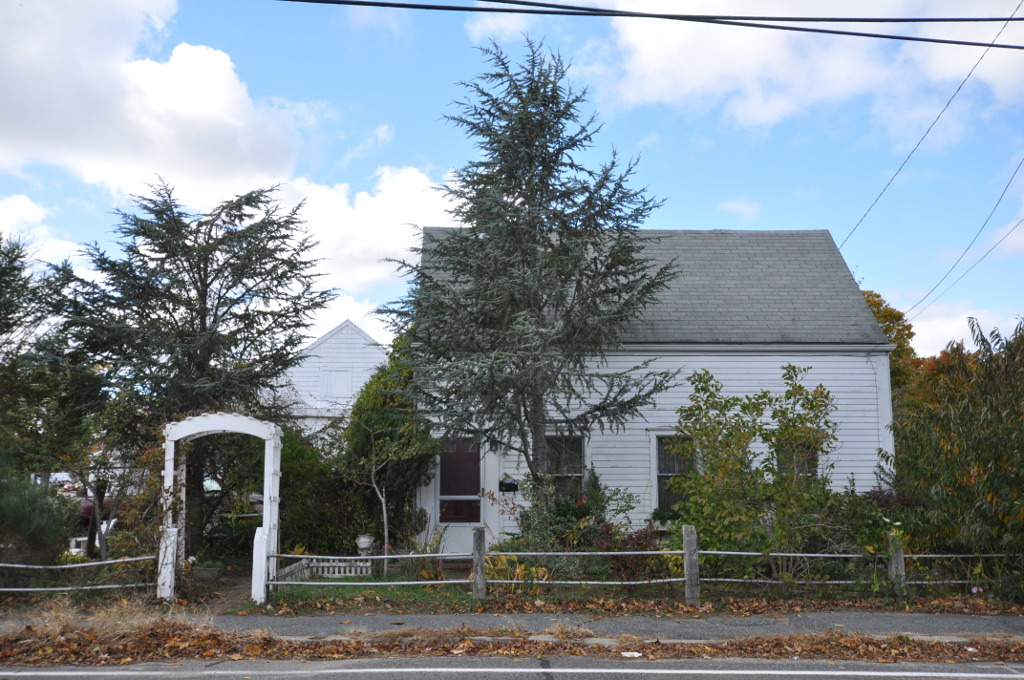

- Location within Cape Cod Location within Massachusetts Location within the United States
- Location: 113 Winter St., Barnstable, Massachusetts
- Coordinates: 41°39′10″N 70°17′14″W
- Built: 1860
- Architectural style: Greek Revival
- MPS: Barnstable MRA
- NRHP reference No.: 87000260
- Added to NRHP: March 13, 1987

The Canary-Hartnett House is a historic house located in Barnstable, Massachusetts. It is significant as a well preserved example of Greek Revival style architecture.

== Description and history ==
This well-preserved 1 1/2-story wood-frame building was built c. 1860, and has simple Greek Revival styling. It is four asymmetrical bays wide, with the main entrance in the left bay, and three evenly spaced sash windows to its right. It has a side gable roof, with a chimney rising through the ridge behind the entrance. The front of the house is finished in clapboards, while the remaining walls are finished in wood shingles. The house is one of the oldest in the area to be associated with the early wave of Irish settlers to arrive after the Great Famine. The property includes a barn that dates to the same period.

The house was listed on the National Register of Historic Places on March 13, 1987.

== See also ==
- National Register of Historic Places listings in Barnstable County, Massachusetts
