= Capt. Allen H. Bearse House =

Historic house in Massachusetts, United States

- U.S. National Register of Historic Places
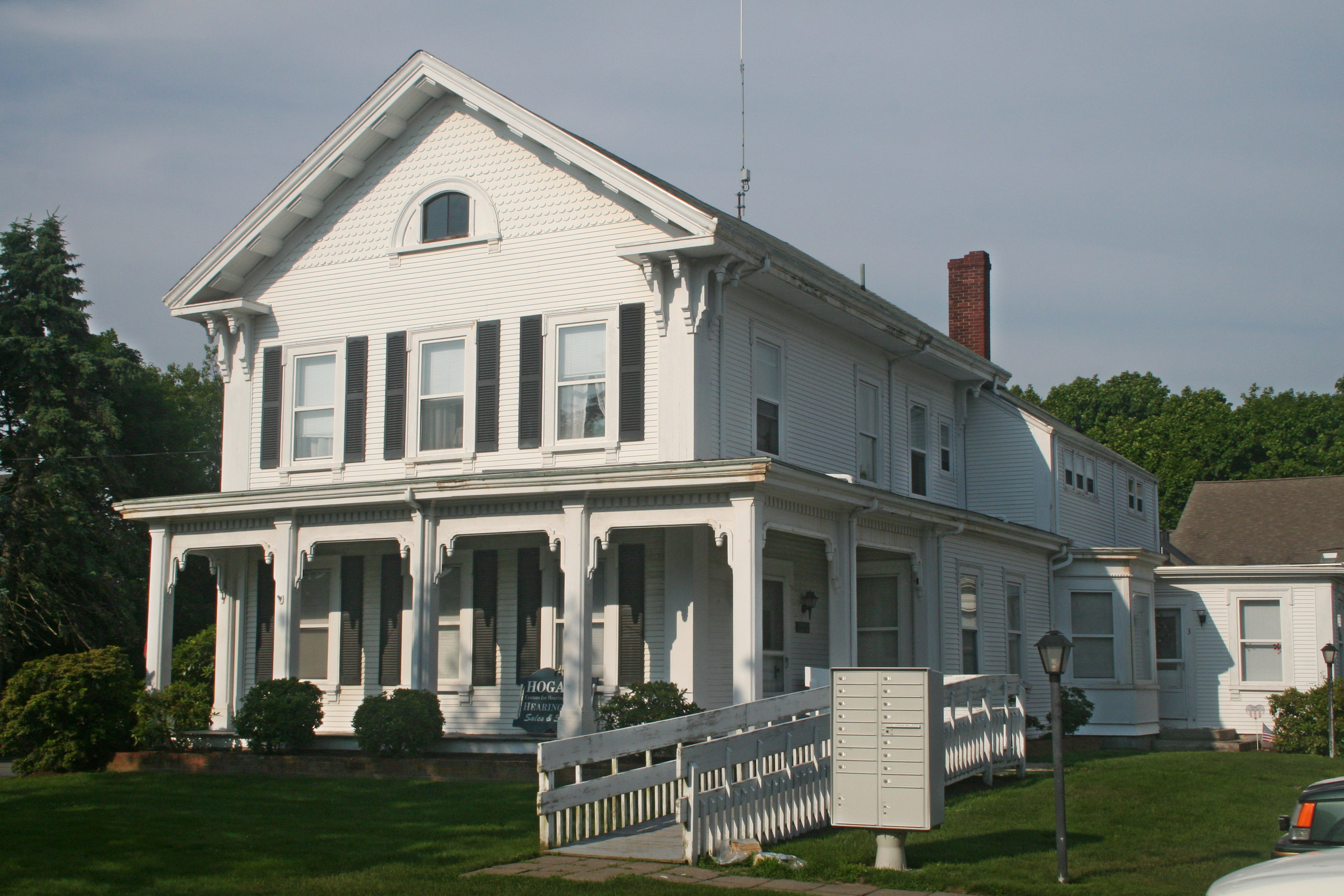

- Location within Cape Cod Location within Massachusetts Location within the United States
- Location: 48 Camp Street, Barnstable, Massachusetts
- Coordinates: 41°39′25″N 70°16′33″W
- Built: 1857
- Architectural style: Italianate
- MPS: Barnstable MRA
- NRHP reference No.: 87000264
- Added to NRHP: March 13, 1987

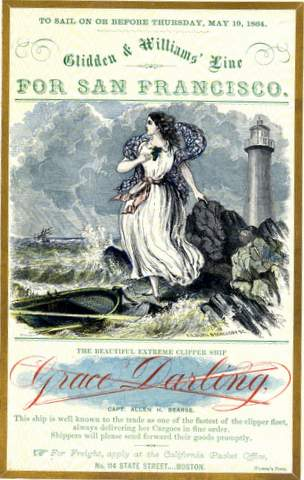
Grace Darling A1 Extreme Clipper, Capt. Allen H. Bearse

The Capt. Allen H. Bearse House is a historic house located in Barnstable, Massachusetts.

== Description and history ==
The 2 1/2-story wood-frame house was built in 1857, and is an exceptionally well preserved example of Italianate styling. It features corner pilasters, bracketed eaves and a wraparound porch with bracketed columns. The house was owned by Allen Bearse, a prominent local deep-water ship's captain who also owned a wharf in Hyannis.

The house was listed on the National Register of Historic Places on March 13, 1987.

== See also ==
- National Register of Historic Places listings in Barnstable County, Massachusetts
