= Josiah A. Ames House =

Historic house in Massachusetts, United States

- U.S. National Register of Historic Places
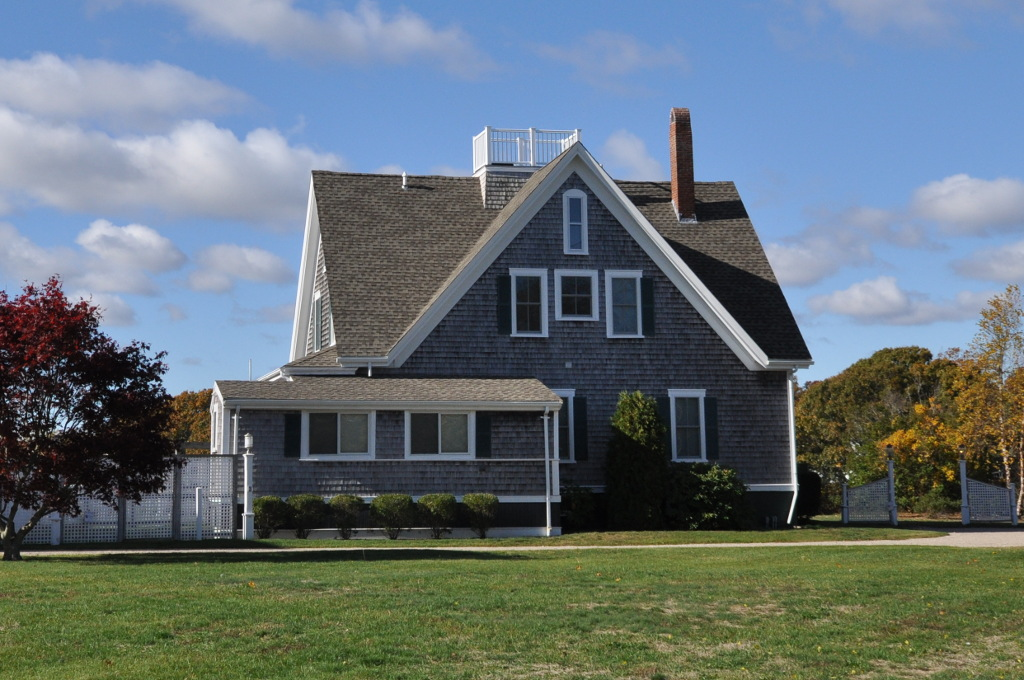

- Location within Cape Cod Location within Massachusetts Location within the United States
- Location: 145 Bridge St., Barnstable, Massachusetts
- Coordinates: 41°37′20″N 70°23′46″W
- Built: 1887
- Architectural style: Queen Anne
- MPS: Barnstable MRA
- NRHP reference No.: 87000300
- Added to NRHP: September 18, 1987

The Josiah A. Ames House is an historic house in Barnstable, Massachusetts. Built in 1887 by a military veteran, it is notable for its association 1902–1922 with the Lincoln House of Boston, a charity providing "fresh air" opportunities to inner city youth. The house was listed on the National Register of Historic Places in 1987.

== Description and history ==
The Josiah A. Ames House stands west of the village of Osterville, on the south side of Bridge Street immediately east of the bridge across the channel between North and West Bays. It is a vernacular Queen Anne Victorian wood-frame house, 2 1/2 stories in height, with a shingled exterior. Its basically square plan is relieved by a cross-gabled roof, and the only other decorative note is found in the narrow segmented-arch windows in the gables.

The house was built in 1887 by Josiah Ames, a veteran of the Mexican–American War and the American Civil War, who was also involved in the California Gold Rush. The house was purchased by a niece of his wife in 1897, and the following year she began renting it to the Lincoln Association of Boston. This organization was established to allow inner-city children, mothers, and teachers to have recreational opportunities away from city conditions. The association purchased the house in 1902 and operated on the premises until 1922. The house has been in private residential use since then.

== See also ==
- National Register of Historic Places listings in Barnstable County, Massachusetts
