= Lemuel B. Chase House =

Historic house in Massachusetts, United States

- U.S. National Register of Historic Places
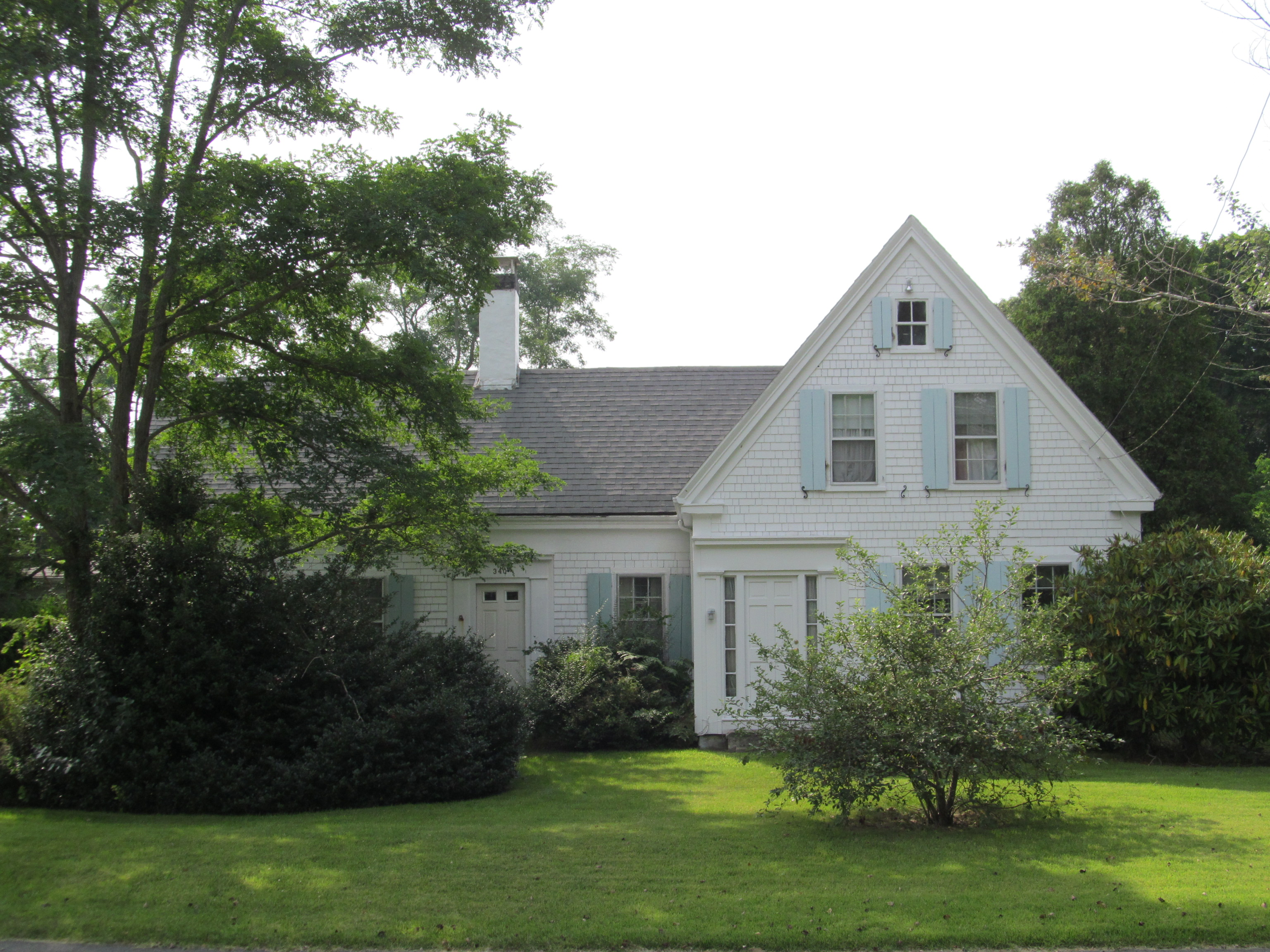
- Lemuel B. Chase House

- Location within Cape Cod Location within Massachusetts
- Location: 340 Scudder Avenue, Barnstable, Massachusetts
- Coordinates: 41°38′21″N 70°18′14″W
- Built: 1820
- Architectural style: Greek Revival
- MPS: Barnstable MRA
- NRHP reference No.: 87000267
- Added to NRHP: March 13, 1987

The Lemuel B. Chase House is a historic house located in Barnstable, Massachusetts. It is a well-preserved example of Greek Revival architecture.

== Description and history ==
The 1-3/4 story wood-frame house was built sometime in the 1820s, and is a well-preserved side-hall entry Greek Revival house with a 1 1/2-story wing. It has wide corner boards supporting a fascia with dentil moulding. The main entry is flanked by sidelight windows and pilasters supporting a full entablature; a side entrance in the wing is similarly styled except for the windows.

The house was listed on the National Register of Historic Places on March 13, 1987.

== See also ==
- National Register of Historic Places listings in Barnstable County, Massachusetts
