= West Barnstable Village–Meetinghouse Way Historic District =

Historic district in Massachusetts, United States

- U.S. National Register of Historic Places
- U.S. Historic district
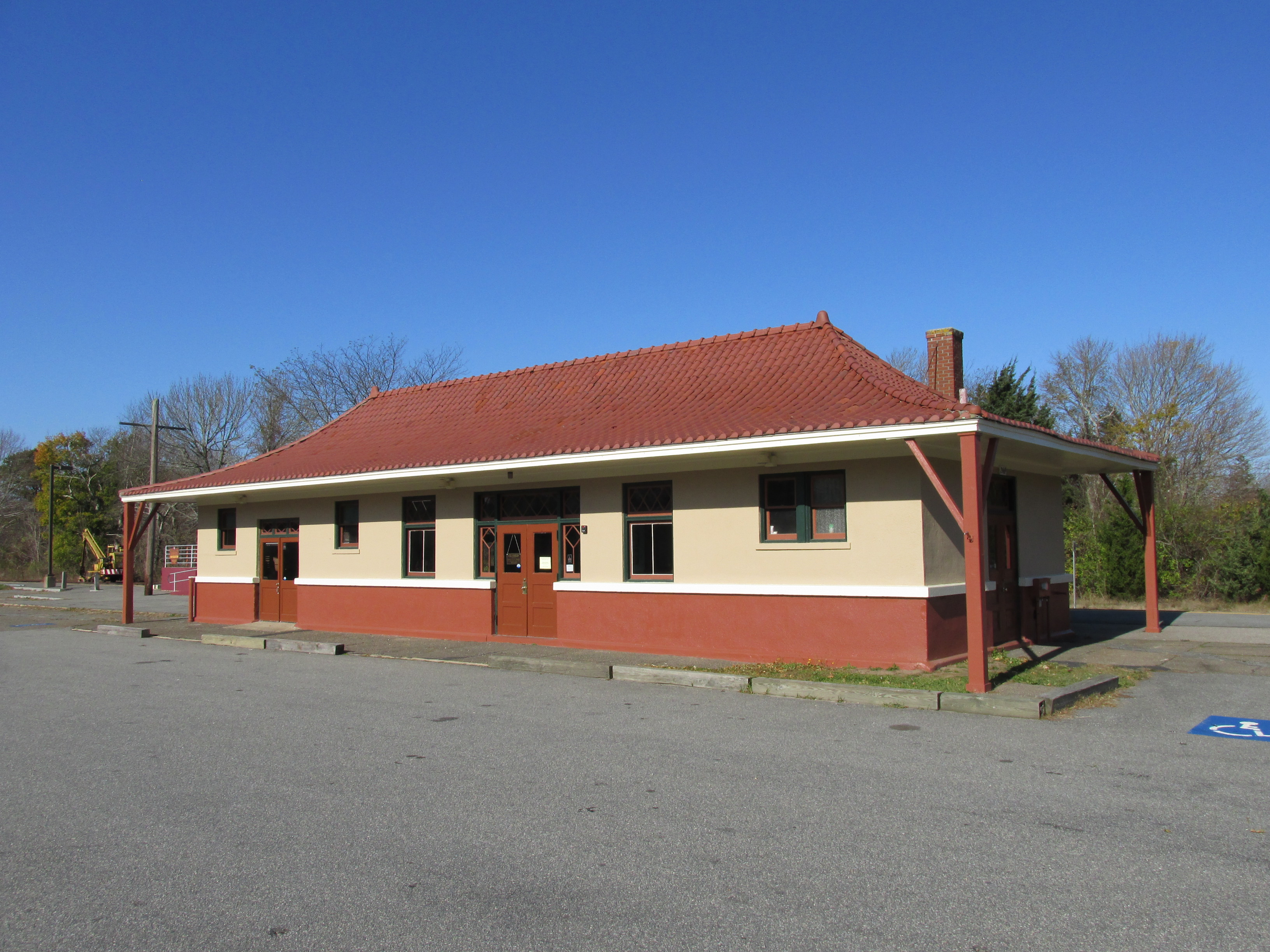
- West Barnstable Train Station

- Location within Cape Cod Location within Massachusetts Location within the United States
- Location: Barnstable, Massachusetts
- Coordinates: 41°42′10″N 70°22′45″W
- Area: 175 acres (71 ha)
- Built: 1717
- Architectural style: Italianate, Federal
- MPS: Barnstable MRA
- NRHP reference No.: 87000255
- Added to NRHP: November 10, 1987

The West Barnstable Village–Meetinghouse Way Historic District is a historic district on Meetinghouse Way from County Rd. to Meetinghouse Road in Barnstable, Massachusetts. The 175-acre (71 ha) district encompasses the historic heart of the village of West Barnstable. This is a roughly linear district, including all of the properties along Meetinghouse Way between County Road and the 1717 West Parish Meetinghouse, which is the district's most prominent building. Most of the houses in the district were built in the 18th and early 19th centuries, and are thus predominantly in Georgian, Federal, and Greek Revival styles. Later buildings include the First Selectmen's Office (1889), elementary school (1903), and railroad station (1910).

The area was added to the National Register of Historic Places in 1987.

== Timeline of West Parish Meetinghouse ==
1712 – By 1712, the Barnstable settlement had grown so large, that the main concern of the annual Town Meeting for several years was the division of the town into two parishes and the building of two Meetinghouses.

1715 – A piece of high ground on the land of John Crocker was chosen as the site for the West Parish Meetinghouse. A proprietors meeting was held on April 11, 1715 and Colonel James Otis was the Moderator. Town land was traded, laying out 4 acres – three acres for public use (now the Town green below the Meetinghouse) and an additional acre for where the Meetinghouse would be erected.

1717 – The town of Barnstable officially voted to divide into an East and a West Parish. The present villages of Osterville and Cotuit were in the West Parish and the villages of Centerville and Hyannis were designated to be in the East Parish. According to records, an order for two precincts was passed on February 7, 1718 and appears in Province Laws, Volume 1X, page 575.

1717 – Construction begins on the West Parish Meetinghouse. Records are largely silent on who actually built it or how but the village craftsmen created a structure that later generations of architects and builders continue to marvel at. Nearby great oaks and pines were felled by hand; pine beams, posts and planks were sawed and trimmed over a saw pit dug at the building site; 12 inch square pine timbers were hewn with adzes and raised 48 feet into the air; oak roof buttresses were curved like a ship's frame by hanging them with weights at either end for a year; chamfering, beading and woodworking on the high pulpit and sounding board, panels and sheep pen pews were all done skillfully with simple tools...

1719 – Construction took two years to complete and the first service of worship in the West Parish Meetinghouse was held on Thanksgiving Day, 1719. Now completed, the 1717 Meetinghouse not only became the permanent home of the church that gathered 103 years before in England but for the next 130 years was also to be the scene of Barnstable town meetings reflecting the close union of State and Congregational church that existed in early Massachusetts. As years progressed, the Meetinghouse would house the village public school.

1723 – Even after only 4 years, the Meetinghouse was deemed too small for its growing congregation and for its secular purposes so was cut in half, the ends pulled apart adding 18 feet of length in the middle. A ceiling exposing only the bottoms of the beams of the Meetinghouse was installed at the same time. A bell tower, one of the earliest in New England was erected. The gilded cock, ordered from England as a weathervane for the Meetinghouse, measures 5 feet, 5 inches from the bill to the tip of the tail and this same "Rooster" crowns the tower today.

1717 thru 1775 – Historians have researched that fifteen years before George Washington was born, the men of Barnstable debated town affairs in the 1717 Meetinghouse. Men who came back from the French and Indian wars recounted their battles. Tories and Patriots argued bitterly. Stormy town meetings, particularly during the Revolutionary War and the War of 1812 periods, would often necessitate major repairs to the 1717 Meetinghouse interior as receipts for repairs found years later in records indicated. If these walls could talk....what we could learn about the people who lived in this community, worshiped at the Meetinghouse, were schooled in the Meetinghouse or served their community in a civic way at the 1717 Meetinghouse. Famous names of this era included James Otis Jr., Mercy Otis Warren, "Mad Jack" Percival, Chief Justice Lemuel Shaw, among others.

1806 – The half-ton bell was cast by Paul Revere for the Town of Barnstable in 1806. It was given to the church in memory of Colonel James Otis, father of the Patriot. It still summons the West Parish of Barnstable church to worship on Sunday mornings.

1717 thru 1880s – the 1717 Meetinghouse as a School: James Otis Jr. (born 2/6/1725) and Mercy Otis (born 9/25/1728) were educated, among many others, in the Meetinghouse.

Rebecca Crocker made a pencil drawing in 1851 of the 1717 Meetinghouse while a student and her drawing is the only detailed image in that era of the 1717 Meetinghouse still known to exist.

As a means of augmenting his yearly salary of $400, Rev. Henry Goodhue, Pastor of West Parish Church from 1863-1883 established a high school in the upstairs vestry now occupied by the choir. It was the first high school in the Town of Barnstable and was open to all pupils in the town. Affirming the existence of this Barnstable public school were notices in the Hyannis Patriot (now the Barnstable Patriot) in the 1870s:

1852 – Some New England parishes demolished their old structures and built new ones when repair costs outweighed budgets. West Parish opted instead to remodel the 1717 Meetinghouse to the neoclassical style favored in the mid-1800s. The old bell tower was torn down, a spire and belfry erected, windows and doors were changed...So much was altered that nothing of the original 1717 Meetinghouse was visible. A century later, however, restoration architects would discover that, underneath it all, the original structure – frame, floor, walls and roof – remained untouched and intact. Ironically, this option of remodeling instead of tearing it down, unknowingly offered the chance to "protect" the 1717 Meetinghouse until it could be authentically restored 100 years later in the 1950s.

1871 – "In the Town Meeting of March 6, 1871: to know if the town will comply with the laws of the State establishing a high school as provided in the second section of Chapter 38 of the General Statutes." And: "At a meeting of the school committee of the Town of Barnstable this day holden it was voted that the school taught by Rev. Mr. Goodhue in the vestry of the church at West Barnstable be fixed or designated and established as the school required by the second section…for the benefit of all the inhabitants of said town… Nathaniel Hinckley, Chairman and Aaron S. Crosby, Secretary."

1874 – On this timeline that Elizabeth Crocker Jenkins was born in West Barnstable on November 30, 1874 as the Town high school was underway in the 1717 Meetinghouse as described above. Miss Jenkins would become the driving force behind the restoration of the 1717 Meetinghouse in the 1950s and the incorporation of the West Parish Memorial Foundation.

1837–1849 – The 1717 Meetinghouse ceases to be used for civic meetings: The Massachusetts Legislature passed the Mass Act of Disestablishment in 1831 and it was ratified in 1833 meaning that meetinghouses could no longer be used for both religious and civil affairs. A Town House was built in 1837 for civic meetings on the corner of Oak Street and Old Stage Road. The 1717 Meetinghouse continued to be used for worship services by the church and as the first high school for the Town of Barnstable.

After 130 years, the 1717 Meetinghouse ceased to be the scene of the town meetings. Public support of the building was withdrawn sending the Meetinghouse into spiraling disrepair.

1907 – M.P. Moller Company from Hagerstown, MD installed a new pipe organ replacing a reed organ. (circa?)

1929 – At the annual meeting of the Church, Miss Samuel and Miss Jenkins challenged parishioners to pledge toward a Restoration Fund. Miss Samuel gave the first $25 gift to the Restoration Fund marking the beginning of years of efforts to gather funds and prepare with architects a plan to restore the 1717 Meetinghouse.

July 30, 1929 – Edwin B. Goodell Jr., leading church architect in America specializing in the Colonial era, began his exploration and investigation of the old "Rooster Church." Initial funds in the Restoration Fund had totaled over $400. Miss Elizabeth Crocker Jenkins was appointed Chairman of the Restoration Committee with Elizabeth Samuel and Cora Crocker as her associates.

1935–1949 – Through the Depression years and World War II, Miss Jenkins kept up her resolve to increase the totals in the Restoration Fund. Often she would give tours of the Meetinghouse for a quarter or quietly donate funds bequeathed to her by family to support the Restoration. Appealing to those with interest in preserving the historical and civic aspects of the 1717 Meetinghouse, Miss Jenkins was enlisting the help of Barnstable historian Donald Trayser, philanthropist Charles Ayling, State Senator Edward C. Stone and attorney Henry A. Ellis.

1938 – Deterioration continued. The horse sheds alongside the Meetinghouse had fallen into such disrepair that they had to be removed along with the "Little House" in the back. The Restoration Committee had been growing with the addition of Miss Lillian Arey, Fred Jenkins, Zebrina Jenkins, Victor Leeman, John Makepeace, Charles Makepeace and Bernard Paine.

Late 1950 – Through the efforts of Deacon Alexander Crane, Mary L. Crocker sold to the Foundation, the land between the Meetinghouse and the Mid-Cape Highway – 4.71 acres. The new purchase by the WPMF provided land upon which the present Jenkins Hall was built and where the outdoor chapel was developed.

January, 1951 – The Restoration Fund totaled $30,601 but it was decided to wait until the fund reached $50,000 before starting the work.

1952 – The Parish House (now known as Jenkins Hall) was built. Funds were raised by the Women's Guild through suppers, fairs, and other projects. The Women's Guild, originally chaired by Ruth Gilman, had been formed in 1948 as discussions began about the need for a Parish House where the church could gather while Restoration work was being done on the Meetinghouse and the need for such a Parish House after the restoration was completed. Permission was cordially granted from the Foundation for the building to be erected on the land newly acquired by the Foundation; Restoration architect Goodell gave his services to design the house and builder Forest Brown helped modify the plans to match the funds available.

1953 – On May 17, the West Parish of Barnstable made a formal covenant with the West Parish Memorial Foundation giving full and complete permission for the work of the Restoration of the 1717 Meetinghouse to the Foundation and to subsequently see to its proper maintenance... in order that the relationship between West Parish and the Foundation might be clarified. Full text is contained in 1976 and 1988 By-Laws.

1953, Spring – Architect Goodell's final plans were approved, nearly half of the $100,000 fund raising goal had been reached; Earle P. Merritt and Charles Ayling were appointed a Building Committee, Rev. Goehring and Deacon Lindsay Armstrong were appointed Parish advisers, Deacon Forest R. Brown was selected as the builder, John Lahteine who would create the complete interior and Charles Hamblin were also on the team. As there were no drawings ever made of the 1717 Meetinghouse, the interior was modeled after the Sandown, NH Meetinghouse.

1955 – WPMF commissioned Quentin Munson to build a Communion table for the 1717 Meetinghouse in Deacon Crane's memory. The top was fashioned from two heavy pine planks which were part of the boarding of shipwright Seth Goodspeed's old workshop in Osterville. (page 39, green booklet by Williams)

August 24, 1958 – The Restoration was finished and a Rededication Service was held. A total of $133,159 was raised and spent on the Restoration of which $18,000 was for materials for the organ.

1960s–2012 – "The 1717 Meetinghouse stands today as one of the finest examples of colonial architecture in the country. It is not a museum. It is a memorial to the devotion of the fathers who built it, a testimony to the faithfulness of those who maintained it through the centuries, and a witness to the life of the active church that worships in it today."

The 1717 Meetinghouse has been listed on the National Register of Historic Places as part of "The West Barnstable Village – Meetinghouse Way Historic District."

The 1717 Meetinghouse is open to the public in the summer from Memorial Day through Columbus Day from 9am to 4pm for self-guided tours. Guided tours can be arranged by appointment.

2011 – Over the years following the restoration, the West Parish Memorial Foundation continues to address the physical needs of the 1717 Meetinghouse – everything from exterior painting to security monitoring systems including daily maintenance.

2012 – A comprehensive needs assessment plan is in development by the Board of Trustees, as the West Parish Memorial Foundation continues its mission of maintaining and preserving the 1717 Meetinghouse

2013 – The Community Preservation Committee of the Town of Barnstable recommends $275,000 be allocated for the restoration of the Revere bell, a new roof, and a fire suppression system. Town Council grants the recommendation.

2013 – The Trustees vote to change the name from West Parish Memorial Foundation to the 1717 Meetinghouse Foundation.

== See also ==
- National Register of Historic Places listings in Barnstable County, Massachusetts

== Sources ==
- The black and white, era 1960s tri-fold brochure entitled West Parish Meetinghouse.
- The "newest" updated color brochure revised in 2008 by Greg Williams and Stan Warren entitled 1717 West Parish Meetinghouse.
- The West Parish Church of Barnstable, An Historical Sketch, by Walter Goehring, published by WPMF, 1959. (pink booklet)
- The Woman Who Saved a Meetinghouse – A Biography of Elizabeth Crocker Jenkins of West Barnstable, MA 1874-1956, by J. Harold Williams, published by WPMF, 1971. (green booklet)
- A New Home in Mattakeese, A Guide to Reverend John Lothropp's Barnstable by Helen Lathrop Taber, 1995.
- "West Parish Meetinghouse" article reprinted in the Barnstable Historical Society's newsletter, December, 2008. pages 4 and 5.
- "Factual History notes" assembled by Foundation Life Member, Richard N. Johnson, 2008.
- The Gist of Jacob, Being An Investigation of the Thought of the Rev. Henry Jacob Who Coined the Designation "Congregational" and Gathered the Most Ancient Church Still Called By That Name, by David Waite Yohn, Pastor/Teacher, West Parish Congregational Church, published by WPMF, 1982. (blue booklet)
