= Capt. Alexander Crocker House =

Historic house in Massachusetts, United States

- U.S. National Register of Historic Places
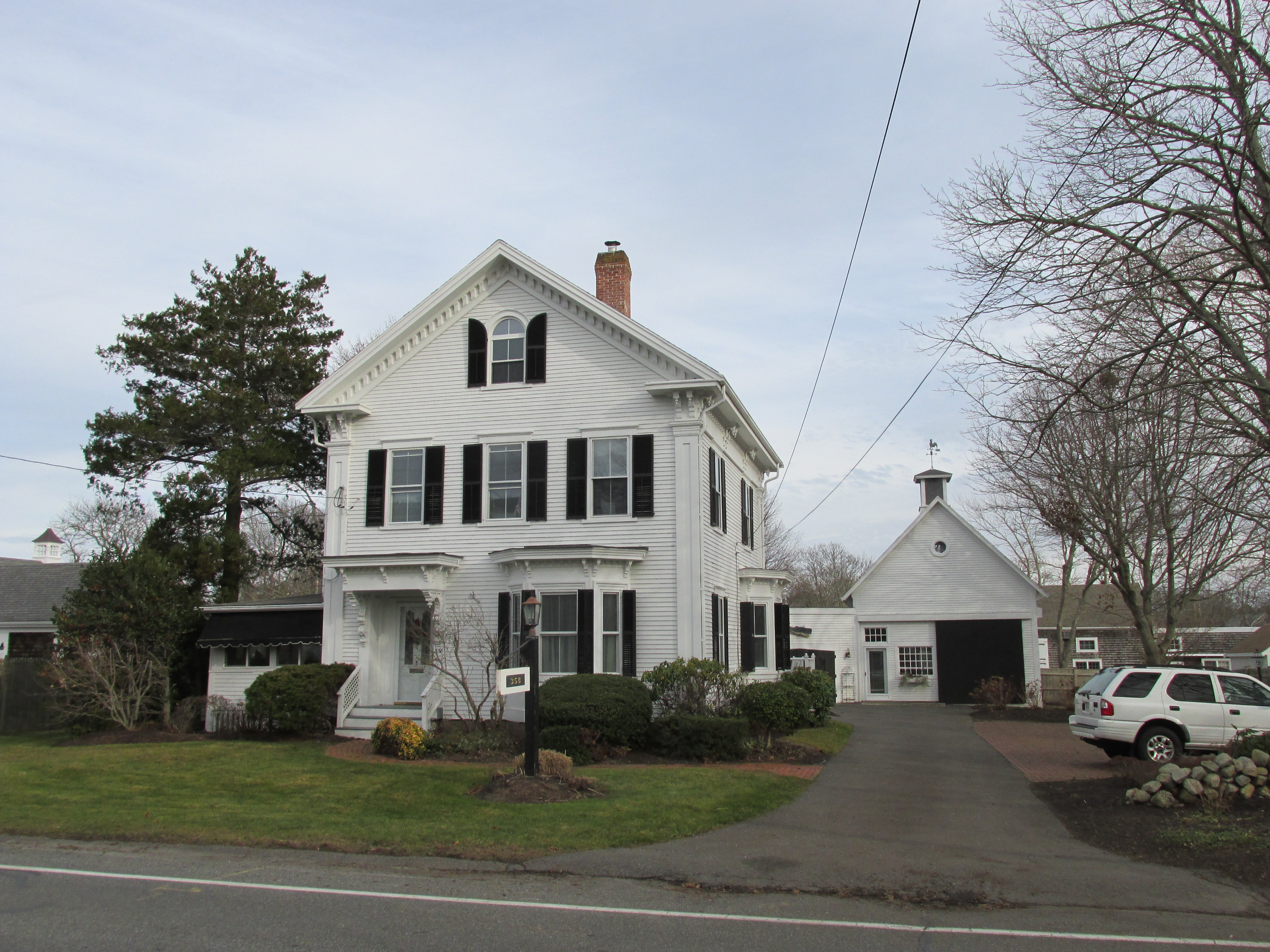
- 358 Sea Street

- Location within Cape Cod Location within Massachusetts Location within the United States
- Location: 358 Sea Street, Barnstable, Massachusetts
- Coordinates: 41°38′20″N 70°17′27″W
- Built: 1865
- Architectural style: Italianate
- MPS: Barnstable MRA
- NRHP reference No.: 87000274
- Added to NRHP: March 13, 1987

The Capt. Alexander Crocker House is a historic house located in the Hyannis village of Barnstable, Massachusetts.

== Description and history ==
The 2 1/2-story wood-frame house was built c. 1865, and is one of the village's finest Italianate houses. It has roughly square proportions, with an off-center entry flanked by a single-story projecting bay window, both of which are topped by cornices with brackets. Above them are three sash windows with projecting lintels, and there is a round-arch window in the gable. The roof line is studded with paired brackets. There is a period barn on the property which is topped by a cupola. Its first owner was a ship's captain.

The house was listed on the National Register of Historic Places on March 13, 1987.

== See also ==
- National Register of Historic Places listings in Barnstable County, Massachusetts
