= Capt. Oliver Bearse House =

Historic house in Massachusetts, United States

- U.S. National Register of Historic Places
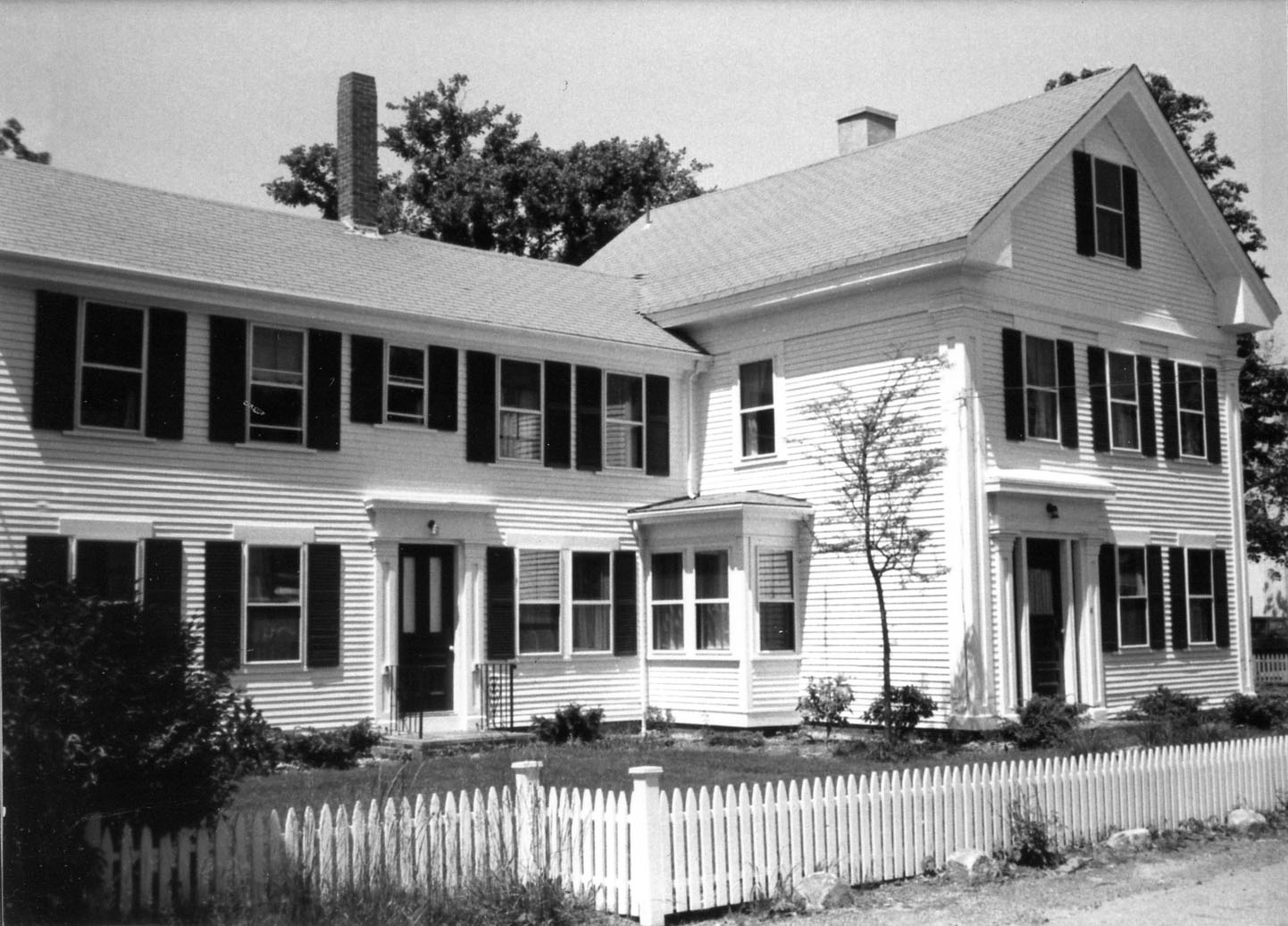
- early 1980s photo

- Location within Cape Cod Location within Massachusetts Location within the United States
- Location: 39 Pearl St., Barnstable, Massachusetts
- Coordinates: 41°39′3″N 70°17′7″W
- Built: 1841
- Architectural style: Greek Revival
- MPS: Barnstable MRA
- NRHP reference No.: 87000276
- Added to NRHP: March 13, 1987

The Captain Oliver Bearse House was a historic house in the Hyannis village of Barnstable, Massachusetts. Built c. 1841, it was a fine example of Greek Revival architecture, built for a prominent local ship's captain. The house was listed on the National Register of Historic Places in 1987. It was extensively damaged by fire in 2011, and has since been demolished.

== Description and history ==
The Captain Oliver Bearse House stood south of Main Street in downtown Hyannis, on the west side of Pearl Street. It was a 2 1/2-story wood-frame structure, with corner pilasters and an entablature that wrapped around the main block. Its entry was flanked by sidelight windows and pilasters, and topped by a heavy lintel and entablature. A five-bay two-story ell extended to the left, with a separate entrance at its center.

The house was built about 1841 for Oliver Bearse. Bearse was from a family descended from one of Hyannis's early settlers, Benjamin Bearse, and both he and his brother Asa were prominent local deep-sea ship's captains. Bearse lived in this house until 1850, and it was sold out of the family in 1898. It was during the 20th century home to Gladys Bond, a longtime librarian of the local library, who died in 1959. It was thereafter converted into a lodging house. It was extensively damaged by fire in 2011, and has since been demolished.

== See also ==
- National Register of Historic Places listings in Barnstable County, Massachusetts
