= Nehemiah Lovell House =

Historic house in Massachusetts, United States

- U.S. National Register of Historic Places
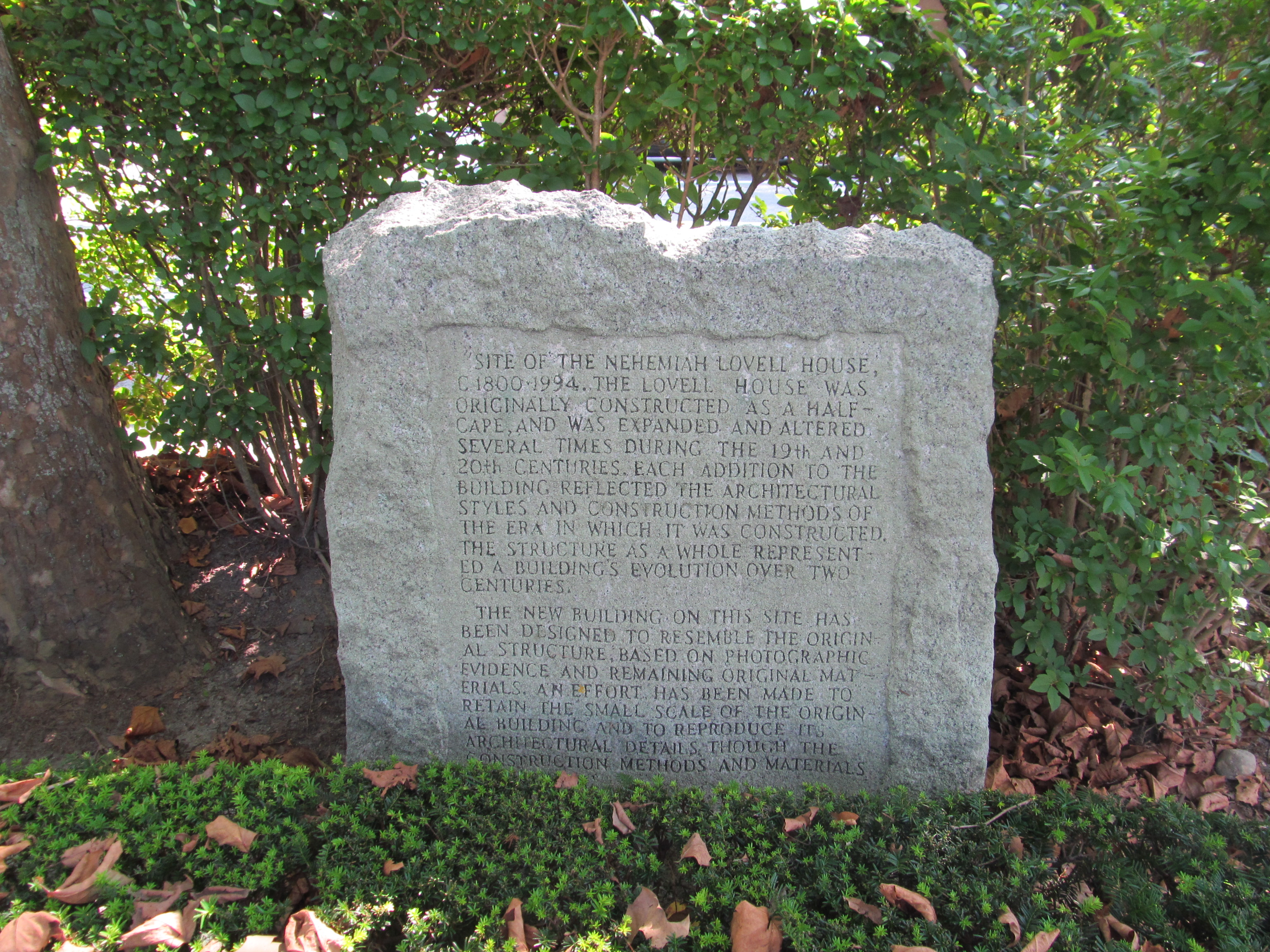
- Marker at the house site

- Location within Cape Cod Location within Massachusetts Location within the United States
- Location: 691 Main Street, Barnstable, Massachusetts
- Coordinates: 41°37′38″N 70°22′51″W
- Built: 1789
- Architectural style: Federal
- MPS: Barnstable MRA
- NRHP reference No.: 87000291
- Added to NRHP: September 18, 1987

The Nehemiah Lovell House was a historic house located in the Osterville section of Barnstable, Massachusetts.

== Description and history ==
The house's 1 1/2-story Cape style main block was built c. 1789, which was apparently soon followed by a two-story ell to its east. The house was in the hands of the Fuller family for nearly 100 years, including Captain David Fuller, who was lost at sea in 1854.

Nehemiah Lovell House was listed on the National Register of Historic Places on September 18, 1987. It was demolished in 1994 and a replica was built.

== See also ==
- National Register of Historic Places listings in Barnstable County, Massachusetts
