= Lot Crocker House =

Historic house in Massachusetts, United States

- U.S. National Register of Historic Places
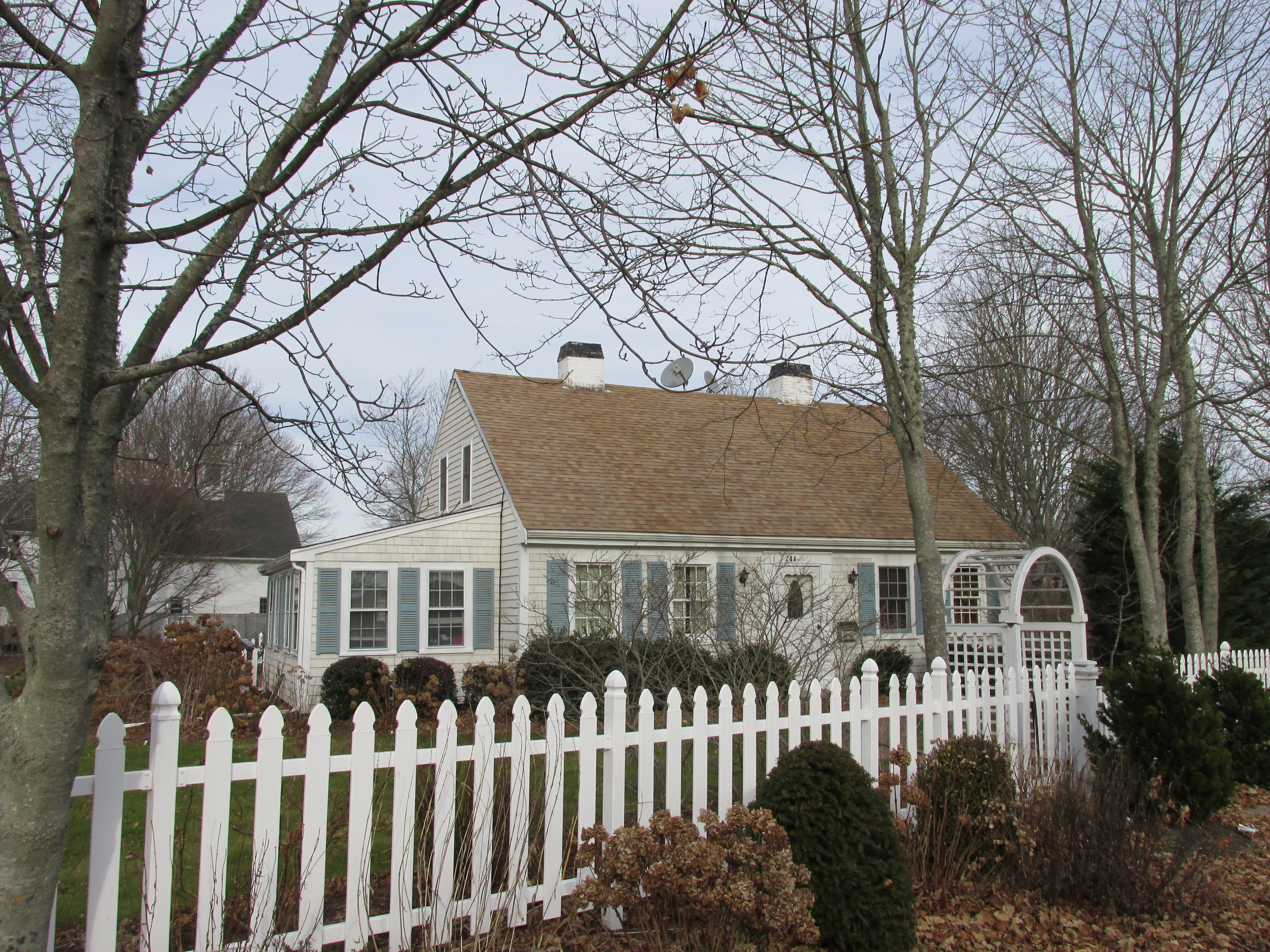
- 284 Gosnold Street

- Location within Cape Cod Location within Massachusetts Location within the United States
- Location: 284 Gosnold Street, Barnstable, Massachusetts
- Coordinates: 41°38′19″N 70°17′27″W
- Built: 1800
- Architectural style: Federal
- MPS: Barnstable MRA
- NRHP reference No.: 87000263
- Added to NRHP: March 13, 1987

The Lot Crocker House is a historic house in Barnstable, Massachusetts. The 1 1/2-story wood frame Cape style house was built c. 1800. It is five bays wide, with a side gable roof and twin interior chimneys, an unusual feature of houses of the period, which more typically have a central chimney. It has a center entry that is topped by a transom window. Lot Crocker, member of a locally prominent family, lived in this house in the mid-19th century and operated a nearby salt works.

The house was listed on the National Register of Historic Places in 1987.

== See also ==
- National Register of Historic Places listings in Barnstable County, Massachusetts
