= Building at 606 Main Street =

Historic building in Massachusetts, US

- U.S. National Register of Historic Places
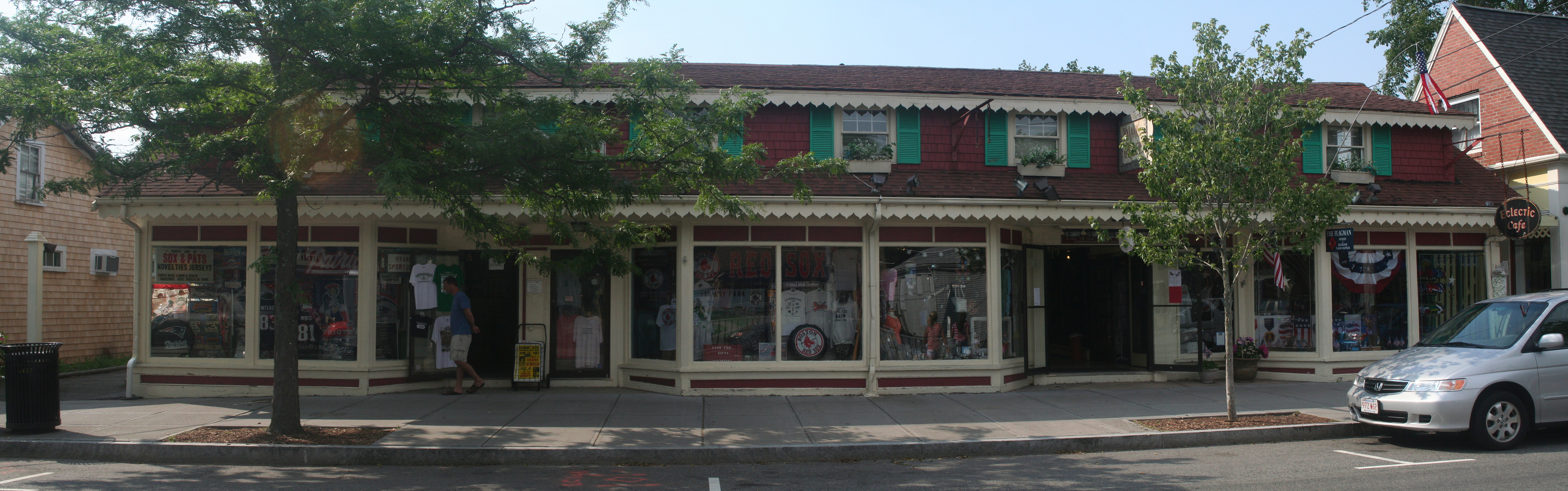

- Location within Cape Cod Location within Massachusetts Location within the United States
- Location: 606 Main St., Barnstable, Massachusetts
- Coordinates: 41°38′56″N 70°17′28″W
- Built: c. 1910
- Architectural style: Early Commercial
- MPS: Barnstable MRA
- NRHP reference No.: 87000287
- Added to NRHP: March 13, 1987

606 Main Street is a historic commercial building located in Barnstable, Massachusetts.

== Description and history ==
Built in about 1910, it is a modest, single-story, wood-framed construction with a gable roof. The front slope of the roof has a long shed-roof dormer, providing some second-level storage space for the shops below. The building is vernacular in style, with paired recessed doorways to the stores. The building typifies Barnstable's modestly-scaled commercial district, fitting well with earlier residential structures.

The building was listed on the National Register of Historic Places on March 13, 1987.

== See also ==
- National Register of Historic Places listings in Barnstable County, Massachusetts
