= West Barnstable, Massachusetts =

West Barnstable
- Village
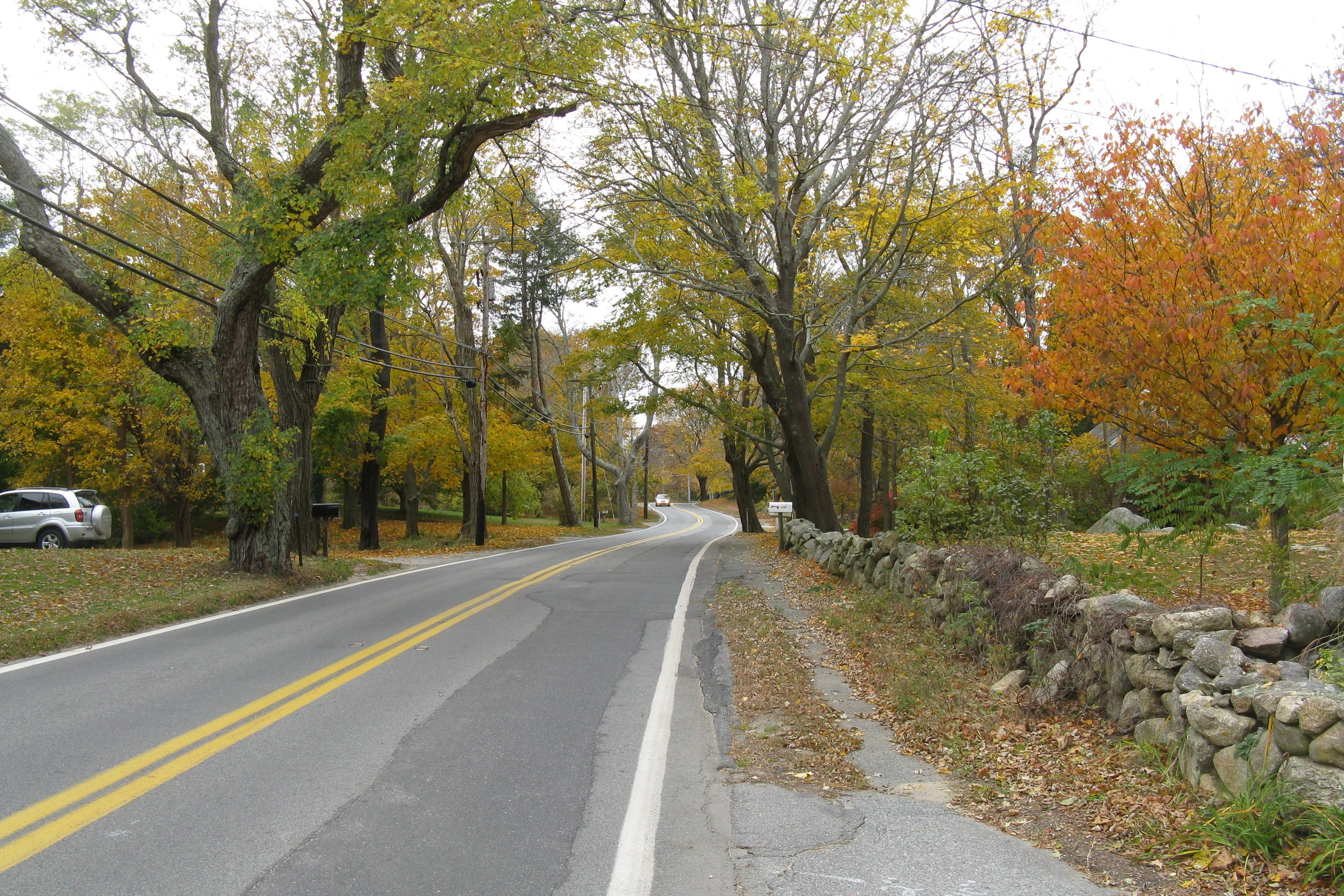
- Massachusetts Route 6A in West Barnstable

- Location of ZIP code 02668 West Barnstable within the Town of Barnstable, county, and state
- Coordinates: 41°42′20″N 70°22′28″W
- Country: United States
- State: Massachusetts
- County: Barnstable
- Town: Barnstable
- Time zone: UTC-5 (Eastern (EST))
  - Summer (DST): UTC-4 (EDT)
- ZIP codes: 02668

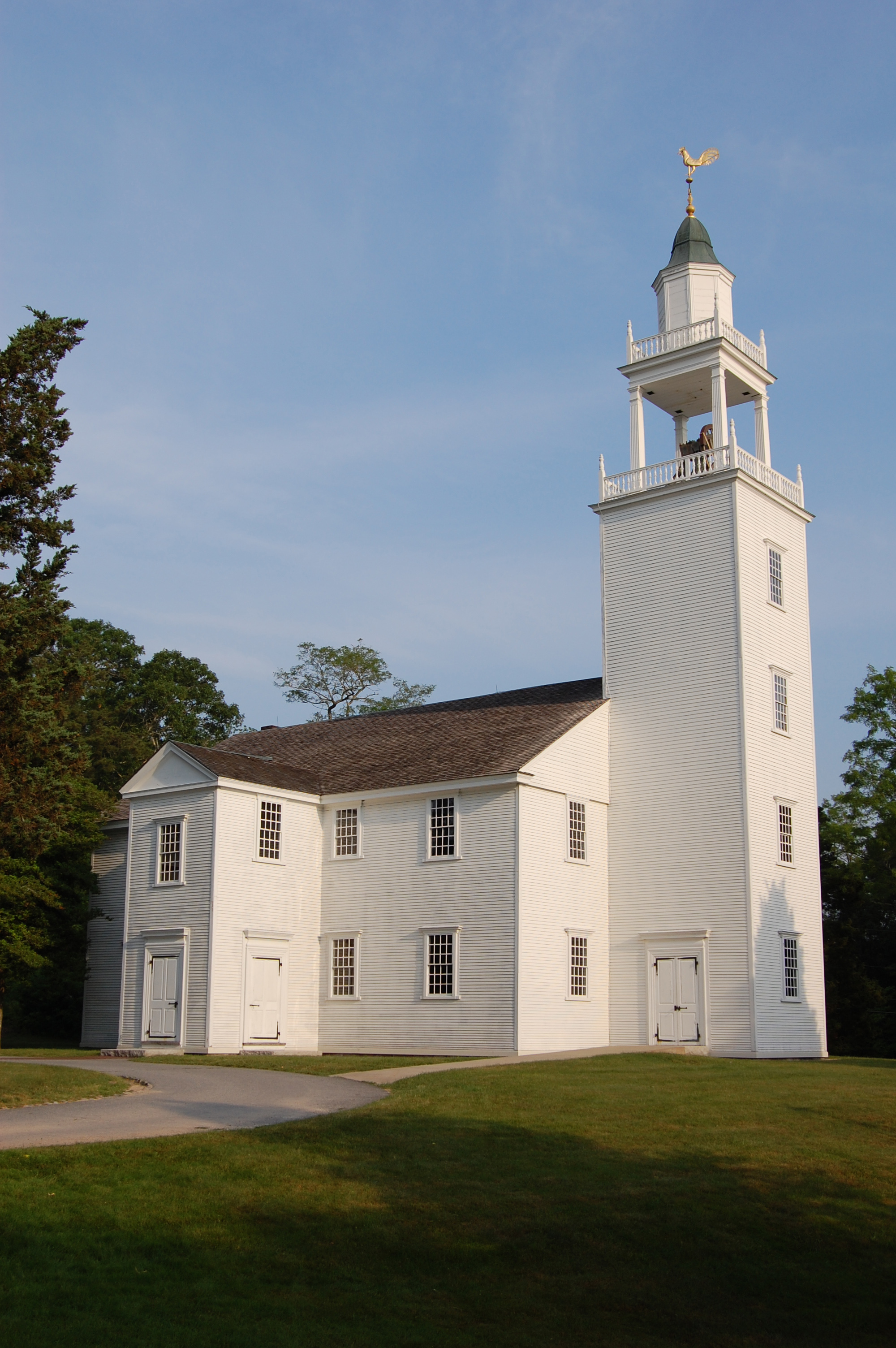
The 1717 West Parish Meetinghouse

West Barnstable is a seaside village in the northwestern part of the town of Barnstable, Barnstable County, Massachusetts, United States. Once devoted to agricultural pursuits, West Barnstable now is largely residential and historic. Originally founded in 1639 as part of its neighboring village Barnstable, West Barnstable separated in 1717 with the split into two parishes of the local congregational church.

West Barnstable is best known for the 1717 West Parish Meetinghouse, Sandy Neck Beach and the Sandy Neck Lighthouse, and the Great Marshes of Barnstable Harbor. It is home to Cape Cod Community College, the only college on Cape Cod proper, and to the historic West Barnstable station. The village's eastern half, settled by Finnish immigrants in the late 19th and early 20th centuries, is still known locally as "Finn Town."

== History ==
=== Indigenous presence and English settlement ===
The Cape Cod region, including the area now known as West Barnstable, was inhabited by the Wampanoag people before European contact. English settlers arrived in 1639, drawn principally by the extensive salt-hay meadows fringing what is now Barnstable Harbor, which provided cheap winter forage for cattle without the labor of clearing forest. The settlement was originally part of the town of Barnstable, one of the earliest English towns on Cape Cod.

=== Parish division of 1717 ===
In 1717 the town's congregational church divided into two parishes, East and West, formally creating West Barnstable as a distinct ecclesiastical and social community. The West Parish meetinghouse, completed the following year, still stands and remains the architectural center of the village.

=== Revolutionary era ===
In the 18th century, despite a population of fewer than 500, West Barnstable produced four nationally prominent figures. James Otis, born in the village in 1725, became an early intellectual leader of the colonial resistance to Parliamentary taxation in Boston. His sister, Mercy Otis Warren, also born and raised next to the Great Marshes, became one of the first women writers in the country and a historian of the American Revolution. Lemuel Shaw, a native of the village, served as chief justice of the Massachusetts Supreme Judicial Court from 1830 to 1860 and is widely regarded as a leading figure in the formative period of American constitutional law. Captain John "Mad Jack" Percival rose to the highest rank then attainable in the U.S. Navy, served in four wars, and in 1844–1846 commanded the USS Constitution on her only circumnavigation of the globe.

=== Railroad and Finnish immigration ===
The Cape Cod Branch Railroad reached West Barnstable in 1854, and a depot was built in the village; the present station was constructed in 1911 in a Spanish Eclectic style unusual for the region. The arrival of regular rail service drew labor for granite quarrying and brickmaking, and from the late 1880s through the 1920s a substantial community of Finnish immigrants settled on the east side of the village, an area still known locally as "Finn Town." The community supported a Finnish-language congregation, a cooperative store, and the Finnish-American Heritage Society, which remains active.

=== Twentieth century to present ===
Through the 20th century the village shifted from an agricultural and small-industrial economy to a largely residential one, with conservation of Sandy Neck, the Great Marshes, and the West Barnstable Conservation Area protecting much of its open land from development. Cape Cod Community College, the only college on Cape Cod proper, opened in West Barnstable in 1961 and remains a major regional educational institution.

== Natural features ==
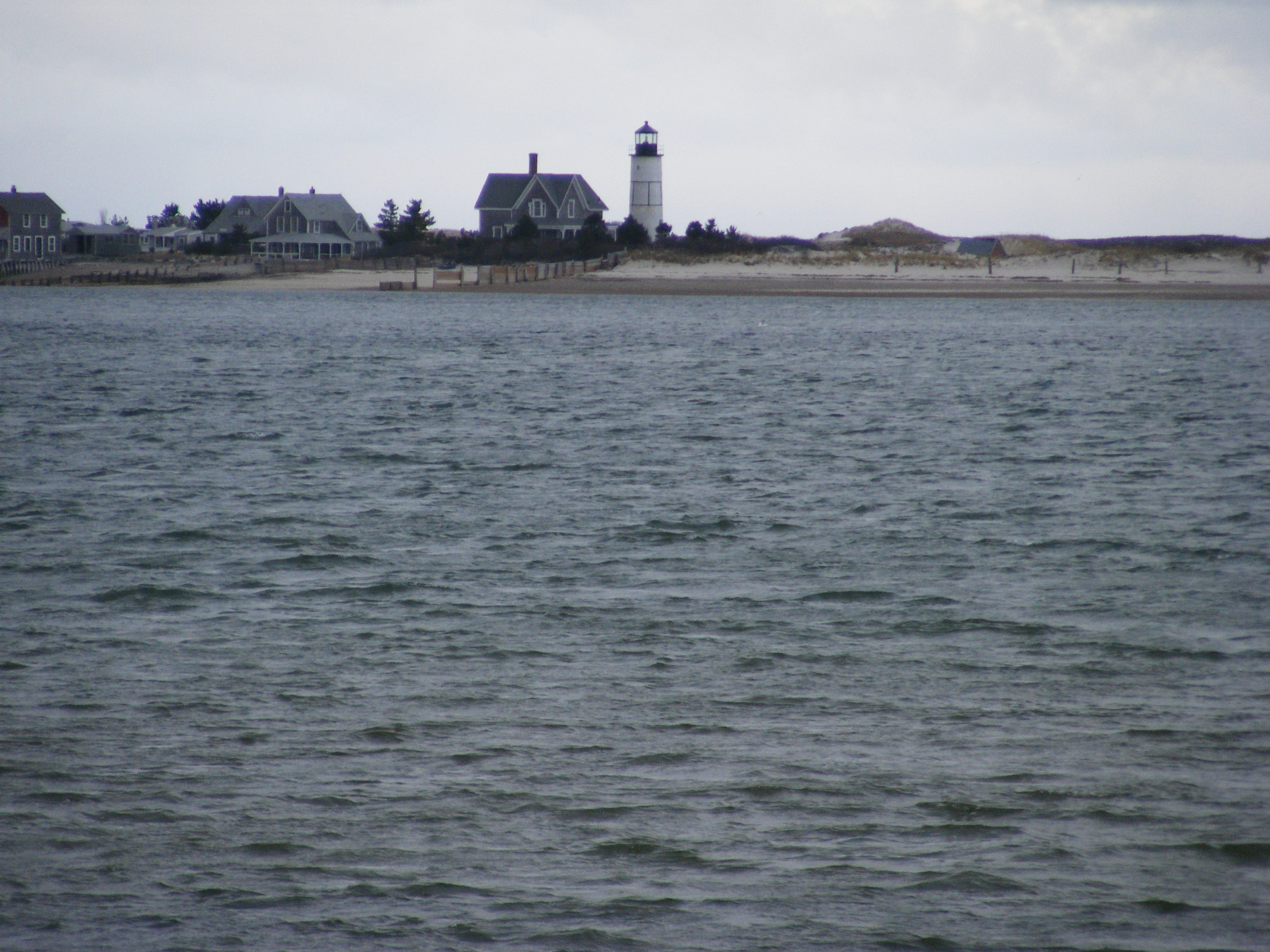
Sandy Neck Light at the tip of the Sandy Neck barrier beach

These include six-mile long Sandy Neck Barrier Beach which protects the extensive Great Marshes, the latter a source of salt hay that attracted the first English settlers to the area in the mid-17th century.

== Notable people ==
- James Otis (1725–1783) – Patriot, lawyer, and early intellectual leader of the American Revolution.
- Mercy Otis Warren (1728–1814) – writer, historian of the American Revolution, and early American political activist.
- Lemuel Shaw (1781–1861) – chief justice of the Massachusetts Supreme Judicial Court, 1830–1860.
- Captain John "Mad Jack" Percival (1779–1862) – U.S. Navy officer who commanded USS Constitution on her only circumnavigation of the globe, 1844–1846.

== Description ==
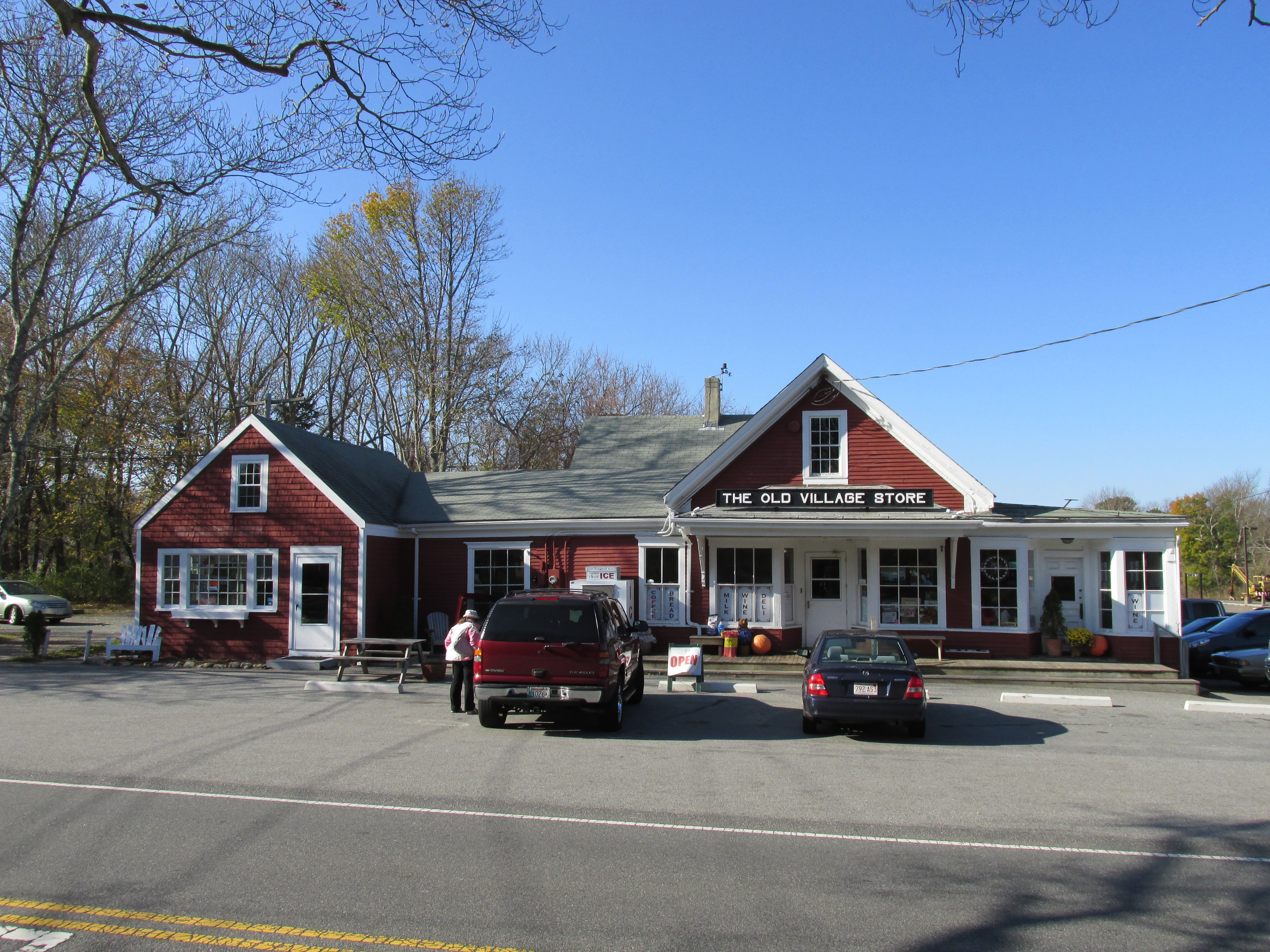
The Old Village Store

The fully restored 1717 Congregational meetinghouse, West Parish of Barnstable, UCC, (West Parish Memorial Foundation) remains a central feature of the village. Also in the center of town, The Old Village Store is a historic and prominent place for locals. Sandy Neck Beach, the largest beach on the mid-cape, is located in the village. Most of West Barnstable consists of Sandy Neck, the Great Marsh/Barnstable Harbor, and the popular West Barnstable Conservation Area. In the late 19th and early 20th centuries a number of Finnish immigrants settled here, and, to this day, the eastern side of the village is known as "Finn Town", while the area near the West Barnstable Train Station is known as "Shark City" reputedly because of the card sharks who hung out there.

== Education ==
West Barnstable is home to Cape Cod Community College, the only college on Cape Cod proper, as well as the Cape Cod Conservatory of Music, Art, Drama & Dance.

== Transportation ==
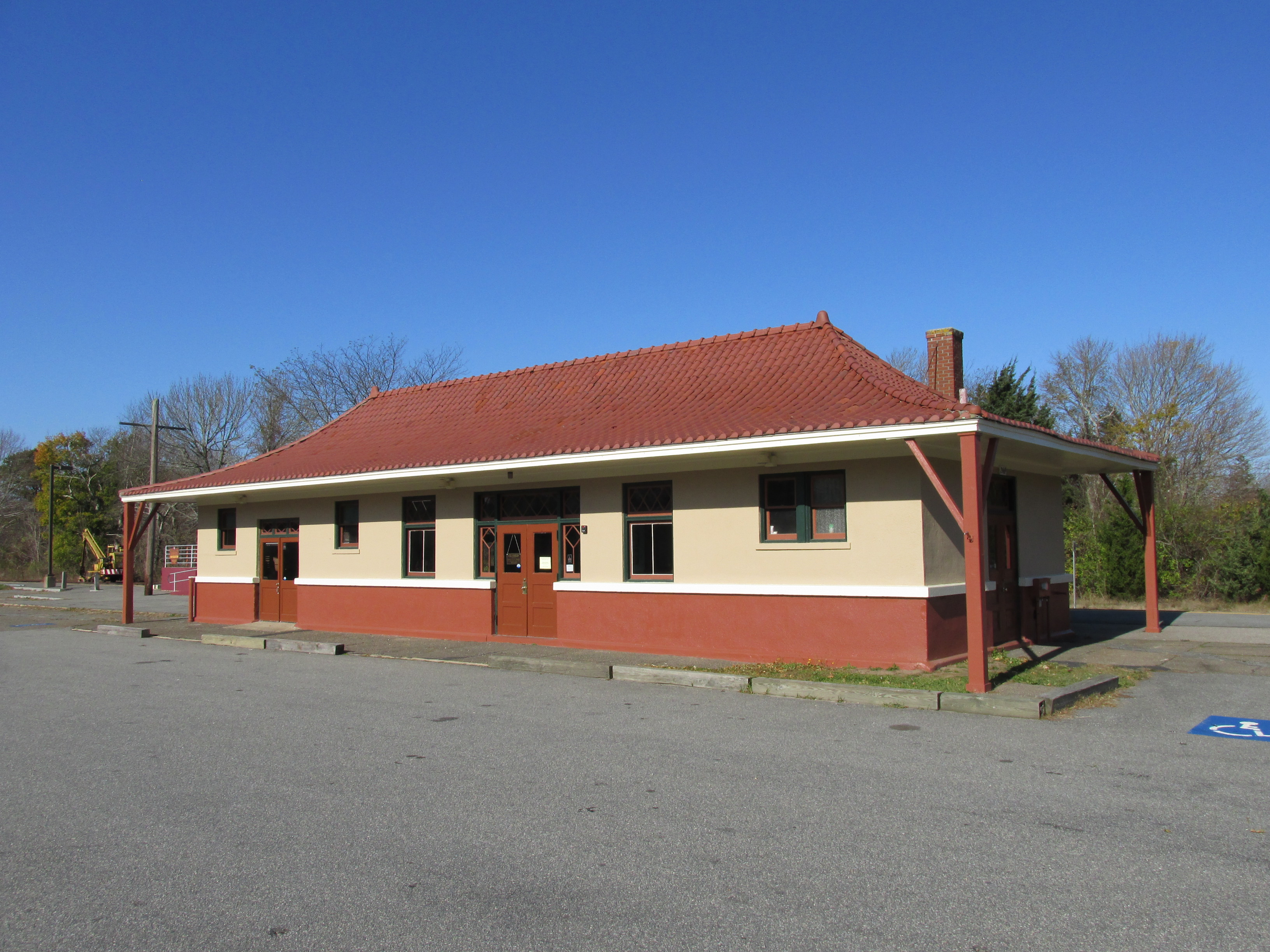
West Barnstable station, restored historic depot

The town was one that had been served by Amtrak's Cape Codder train service (1986–1996); however, it has been eliminated from the schedule of the seasonal Cape Flyer train service. From the 19th Century, under the Old Colony Railroad and until 1964 under the New York, New Haven and Hartford Railroad, passenger trains served West Barnstable. Trains of the 1940s-1960s included the Day Cape Codder and the Neptune.

== See also ==
- West Barnstable Train Station
