= Sandy Neck Light =

Lighthouse in Massachusetts, United States

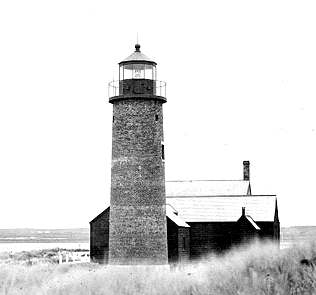
- US Coast Guard photo
- Location: Barnstable, Massachusetts
- Coordinates: 41°43′22″N 70°16′52″W

Tower
- Constructed: 1826
- Height: 16 m (52 ft)
- Shape: Cylindrical Stone Tower
- Markings: White with black bands and lantern
- Heritage: National Register of Historic Places contributing property
- Fog signal: none

Light
- First lit: 1857 (current structure)
- Deactivated: 1931-2007
- Focal height: 15 m (49 ft)
- Lens: 5th order Fresnel lens (original); LED (current)
- Range: 4 nautical miles (7.4 km; 4.6 mi)
- Characteristic: Fl W 6s

Sandy Neck Light is a lighthouse on Sandy Neck, in West Barnstable, Massachusetts, at the entrance to Barnstable Harbor. It was first established in 1826. The current tower was built in 1857 and strengthened in the 1880s. It was discontinued in 1931, replaced by a skeleton tower, which was discontinued in 1952. The light was relit as a private aid to navigation in 2007.
