= Sandy Neck Beach =

Bay on the southern beach of Cape Cod, Massachusetts

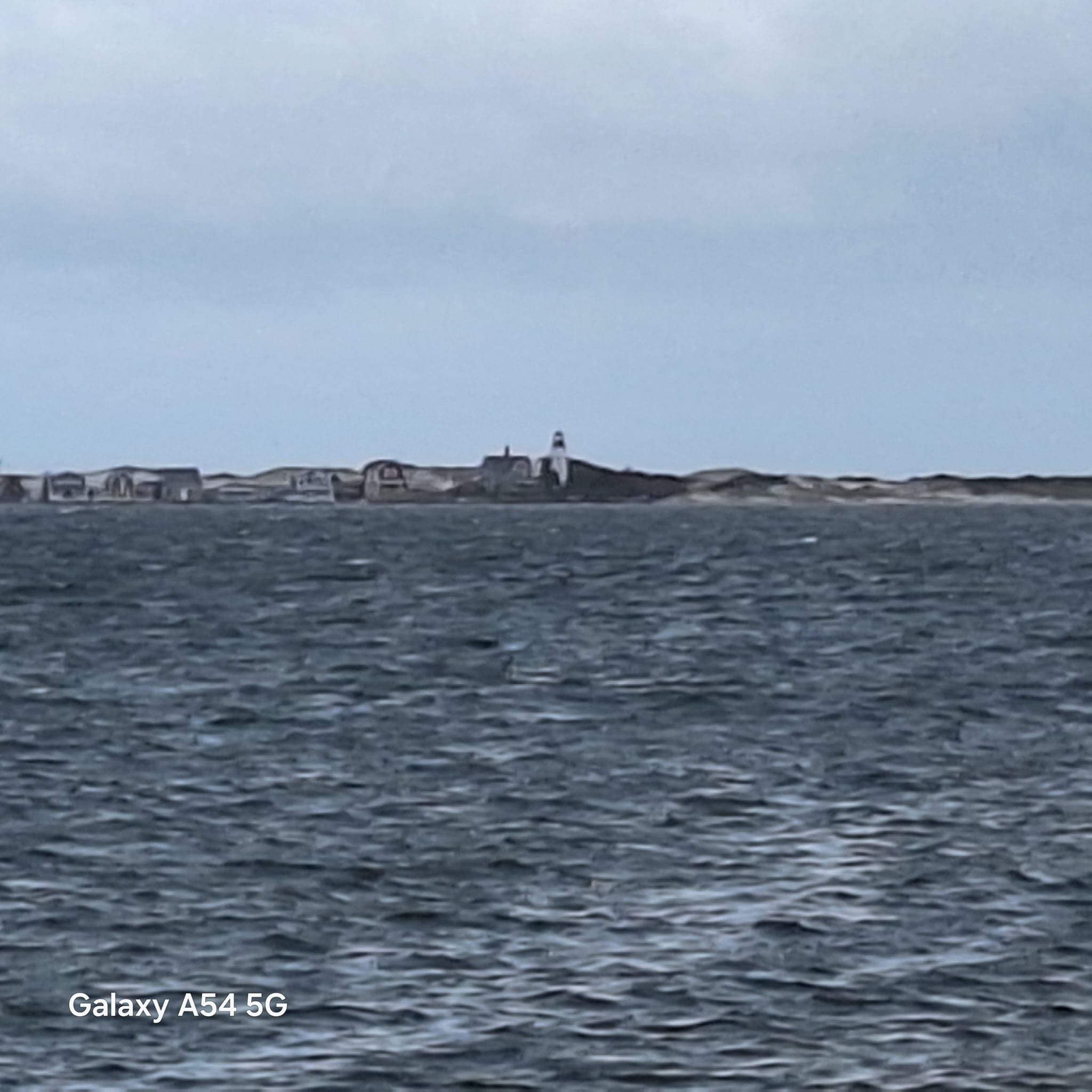
- The eastern part of Sandy Neck Beach, with the lighthouse on its side.

- The Sandy Neck Beach is the barrier beach shawn on the Southern Shoreline of Cape Cod
- Location: Cape Cod, Massachusetts
- Coordinates: 40°37′04″N 73°50′33″W
- Type: barrier beach and shoal (sandstone)
- Part of: Cape Cod shoreline
- Ocean/sea sources: Atlantic Ocean

Sandy Neck Beach is a sandstone barrier beach that stretches 6.5 miles (10.6 kilometers) long and one half-mile (800 m) wide along Cape Cod Bay, backed along its entire length by sand dunes and a salt marsh. It is a destination for swimming, hiking, and saltwater fishing. The dunes are a habitat for red foxes, deer, shorebirds and wildflowers.

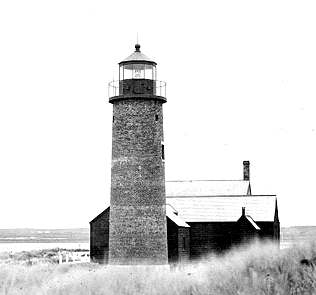
Sandy Neck Lighthouse, Barnstable, Massachusetts

In the Nineteenth Century, Barnstable was an essential port for fishing, whaling, and coastal trade. On May 18, 1826, Congress authorized $3,500 for a lighthouse at the east end of Sandy Neck, at a point known as Beach Point. In a show of support, Barnstable sold a two-acre parcel of real estate for one dollar to construct the lighthouse. On October 1, 1826, the Sandy Neck Lighthouse, which cost $2,911 then, went into service. In 1857 the current brick lighthouse 48-foot tall (14.5 meters) was built just north of the original structure. Thirty years later two iron hoops and six vertical bars were placed around the central part of the heavily cracked tower to strengthen it and prevent further decay. The history of the lighthouse is recorded until the 1950s. In 2003, the committee for the restoration of the Sandy Neck Lighthouse was established to restore the tower with the assistance of the Cape Cod branch of the American Lighthouse Foundation.

On October 20, 2007, the 150th anniversary of the building of the current tower, a group of supporters aboard a tourist cruise vessel uncovered the lighthouse's searchlight room, allowing the Sandy Point Beacon to shine again. A fireworks display behind the lighthouse concluded the evening. The station's oil house, built in 1905, was restored in 2008, and in 2010 a light emitting diode (LED) beacon was installed in the searchlight room, increasing the range of the light from 4.2 to 10.4 nautical miles.

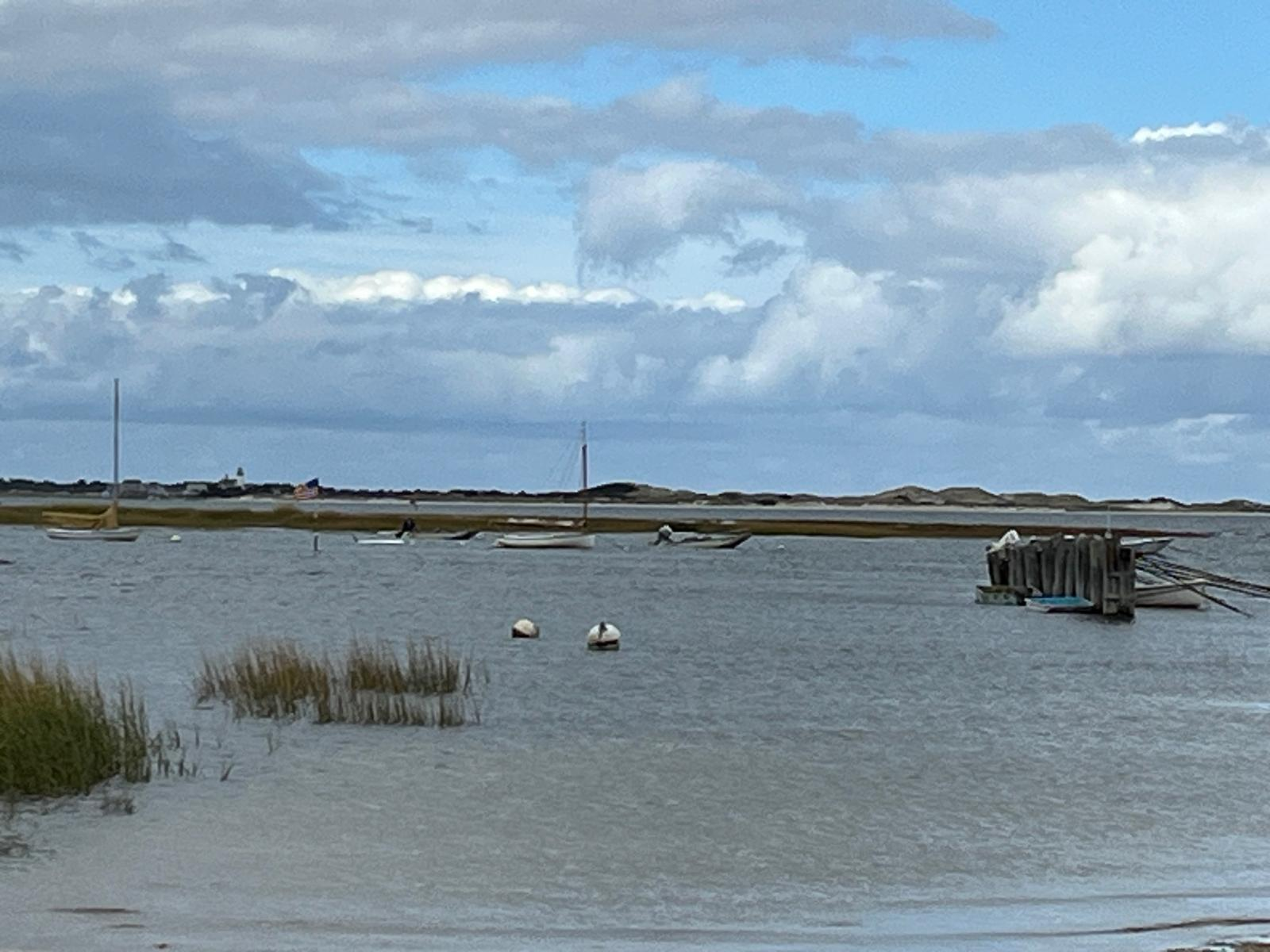
Sandy Neck Beach View from Yarmouth Port off Thatcher Hill Rd and Water Street. A special attention to the Lighthouse.

About two dozen cottages, many of which are more than a century old, still cluster as Sandy Neck Colony near the edge of Sandy Neck. One of the first cottages was used as a restaurant. The beach itself is public and it is one of the most popular locations on Cape Cod.
