= Centerville Elementary School =

Centerville Elementary School may refer to:

- Centerville Elementary School - Barnstable Public School District
- Centerville Elementary School - Virginia Beach City Public Schools

== See also ==
- Centreville Elementary School - Fairfax County Public Schools
