= Ancient Burying Ground =

Historic site in Barnstable, Massachusetts, US

- U.S. National Register of Historic Places
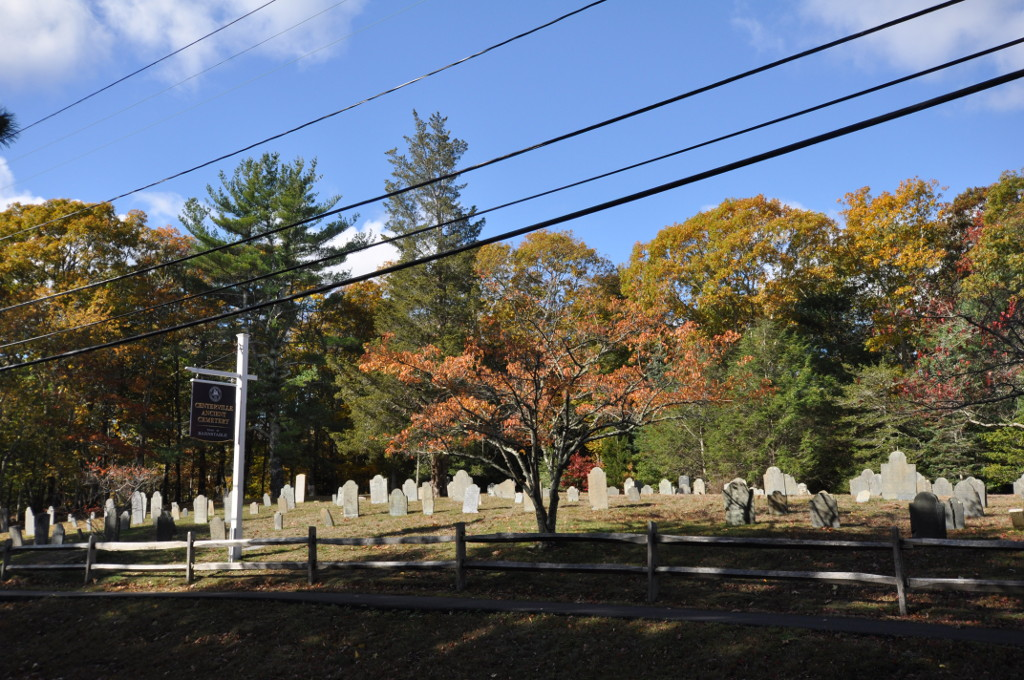

- Location within Cape Cod Location within Massachusetts Location within the United States
- Location: Phinney's Lane, Barnstable, Massachusetts
- Coordinates: 41°39′17″N 70°20′38″W
- Area: 0.75 acres (0.30 ha)
- MPS: Barnstable MRA
- NRHP reference No.: 87000283
- Added to NRHP: March 13, 1987

The Ancient Burying Ground (or Phinney's Lane Cemetery) is a historical cemetery at Phinney's Lane in Barnstable, Massachusetts. It is the oldest cemetery in the village of Centerville, and the only surviving civic element of its colonial origins. was listed on the National Register of Historic Places in 1987.

== Description and history ==
Centerville's Ancient Burying Ground is located in the northern part of the village, on the northwest side of Phinney's Lane between Main Street and the Old Post Road. It is a roughly rectangular lot 0.75 acres (0.30 ha) in size. The street side is lined with a split-rail fence, while the northwest and southwest sides are fringed by trees, which separate the cemetery from surrounding residential development. A private drive extends along the northeast side, leading to a private residence set behind the cemetery. Gravestones are generally oriented facing toward the street. Older gravestones in the cemetery are slate with either skull or winged-angel motif, while later markers are of marble or granite. The oldest marked grave in the cemetery is that of Jonathan Hamblen in 1743.

The cemetery is the only surviving civic element of Centerville's early colonial history. The area was originally known as Chequaquet, and remained sparsely settled in the 18th century. What development there was centered along this stretch of Phinney's Lane, and included a gristmill, tavern, schoolhouse, and the village's first meetinghouse, which was built in 1796. None of these structures survives, but a private house (the William and Jane Phinney House) dated c. 1730 does.

== See also ==
- National Register of Historic Places listings in Barnstable, Massachusetts
