= Barnstable High School =

Public school in Barnstable, Massachusetts, United States

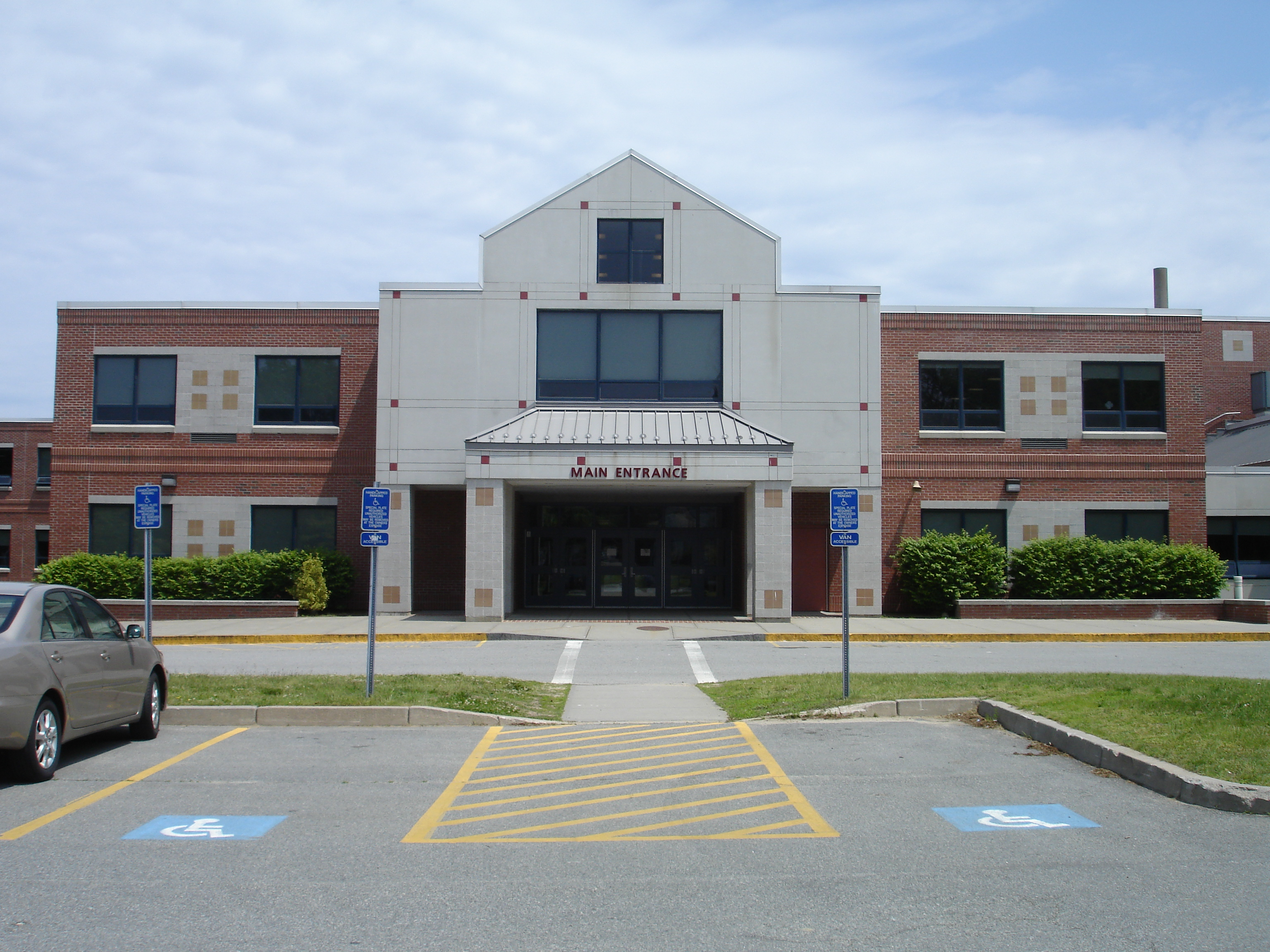

Location
- 744 West Main Street; Hyannis, Massachusetts 02601; United States; 41°39′16.1″N 70°19′17.3″W

Information
- Type: Public; Open enrollment
- Motto: Pride, Respect, Honor
- Established: 1889; 137 years ago
- School district: Barnstable Public School District
- Principal: Jason Conetta
- Teaching staff: 154.47 (FTE)
- Grades: 8–12
- Enrollment: 1,756 (2023–24)
- Student to teacher ratio: 11.37
- Language: English
- Colors: Red; White
- Athletics conference: MIAA District D – Old Colony League
- Nickname: Red Hawks
- Newspaper: Insight
- Yearbook: Barnacle
- Communities served: Town of Barnstable
- Feeder schools: Barnstable Middle School
- Website: https://bhs.barnstable.k12.ma.us/

Barnstable High School is a public high school (grades 8–12) in the village of Hyannis, Massachusetts, United States, Town of Barnstable. The school is part of the Barnstable Public School District.

Barnstable High School was founded in the 19th century and was located on High School Road in Hyannis before relocating to its current location on West Main Street in 1959. The school has had several major renovations and building additions over the years, most recently in 1998.

== History ==
=== First permanent location ===
Barnstable High School never really had a permanent location until 1905, when a building was erected at the present site of Saint John Paul II High School. In 1930, the building was rebuilt. The building was renovated in 1939, due to the increase of students, but it was decided that a new school should be built using land willed to the town by Enoch Cobb.

=== Modern building ===
The modern high school building was built from 1956–1957. On September 5, 1957, the new building was officially opened. The original layout included the modern 1200s, 1300s, 1400s, and 1500s.

The original layout lacked the present library and cafeteria, which were added later on. The original library was located near the entrance to the modern library. A unique feature of the building were the two cafeterias. One cafeteria was located near on the site of the weight room and athletic office, and the kitchen was also located on the site of the present weight room. The field house was also absent in the original layout.

Originally, the high school hosted a vocational school in the modern lower 1200s. The basement of the original building also was built as a bomb shelter, not unusual during the Cold War.

The completion of the school did not mean an end to the usage of the old building's facilities. When the school was completed, it lacked athletic fields, which were still under construction. For at least the first year, sporting events were held at the old building.

In 1963, the modern 1600s wing was added. The school underwent a renovation in 1976, which added the field house, cafeteria, library and some classrooms nearby. In 1975, the vocational high school closed because of the opening of Cape Cod Regional Technical High School in Harwich. The wing was then turned into the art wing for the school. Mechanical drawing was one of the classes offered in the old shop wing.

In 2019, the library completed a $3.5M renovation, which was overseen by librarian Sharon Morgan.

== Athletic state championships ==
Barnstable is most known for their girls' volleyball and girls' gymnastics teams. Barnstable has the most girls' volleyball state championships in the state of Massachusetts with a total of 18, and the most girls' gymnastics state championships in the state with a total of 12.

Note: Some state championships from the 2024-2025 school year may not be included because some of the MIAA state championship archives haven't been updated.

Sport	Year(s)
MIAA sanctioned sports
Girls' volleyball (18)	1993, 1995, 1996, 1997, 1998, 2000, 2003, 2004, 2005, 2006, 2007, 2008, 2010, 2011, 2012, 2013, 2015, 2016
Girls' gymnastics (12)	2001, 2002, 2003, 2004, 2007, 2008, 2009, 2010, 2013, 2014, 2015, 2016
Boys' ice hockey (3)	1972, 1980, 1991
Football (2)	1995, 1999, 2012
Boys' tennis (1)	2015
Boys' golf (1)	1998
Girls' indoor track (1)	1999, 2001
Boys' basketball (1)	1971
Girls' cross country (1)	1999
Girls' ice hockey (1)	2007
