= Sandy Neck Cultural Resources District =

Historic district in Massachusetts, United States

- U.S. National Register of Historic Places
- U.S. Historic district
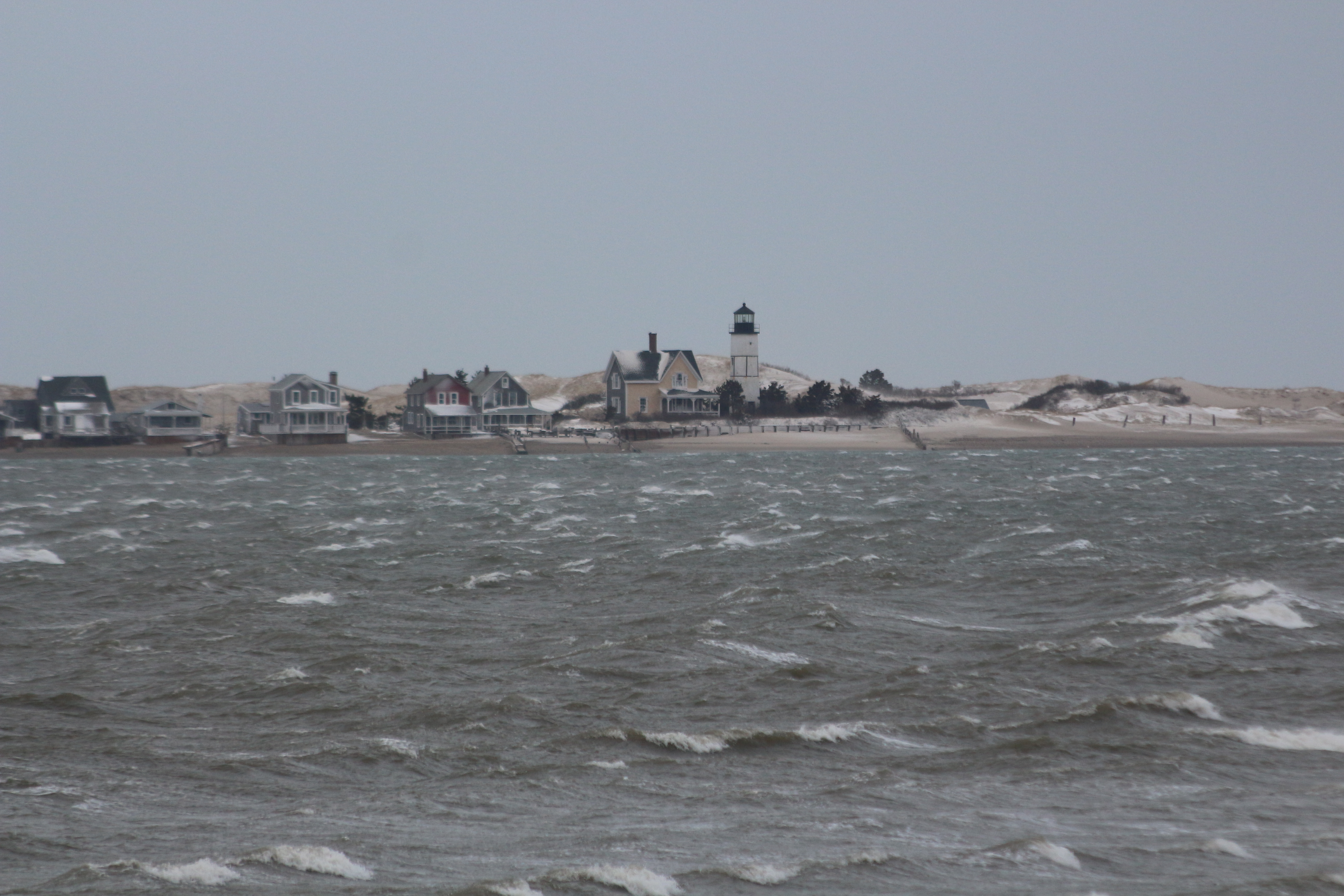

- Location within Cape Cod Location within Massachusetts Location within the United States
- Location: Barnstable, Massachusetts
- Architectural style: Late Gothic Revival, Bungalow/Craftsman, Queen Anne
- MPS: Barnstable MRA
- NRHP reference No.: 87000305
- Added to NRHP: November 10, 1987

Sandy Neck Cultural Resources District is a historic district in Barnstable, Massachusetts. Sandy Neck is a long spit of land extending east–west on the northern shore of the lower portion of Cape Cod, sheltering Barnstable Harbor. This area has a fairly lengthy history of human occupation, including archaeological prehistoric and colonial historic resources. Archaeological research in the 1960s identified shell middens dating from the pre-contact Woodland Period.

The district was added to the National Register of Historic Places in 1987.

== See also ==
- National Register of Historic Places listings in Barnstable County, Massachusetts
