= Centerville River =

Location
- Country: United States
- State: Massachusetts

Physical characteristics
- Source: Wequaquet Lake
  - location: NW of Hyannis
  - coordinates: 41.6602778°N 70.335°W
  - elevation: 33 ft (10 m)
- Mouth: Atlantic Ocean
  - location: E of Osterville
  - coordinates: 41°37′30″N 70°21′53″W
  - elevation: 0 ft (0 m)

Centerville River is a river in Barnstable County, Massachusetts. It drains out of Wequaquet Lake northwest of Hyannis, flows through Craigville, and empties into the Centerville Harbor which drains into the Atlantic Ocean east of Osterville. According to the Bicentennial history book commissioned by the Town of Barnstable ("Seven Villages of Barnstable"), the drainage path was natural below Pine Street, but was excavated by unemployed Civil War veterans in 1867. This work was paid for by the Town. Coincidentally, a "Nine Mile Pond Fishing Company" was chartered for extracting herring from Lake Wequaquet at the same time.
