= Eliza Scudder =

American hymnwriter (1821–1896)

- Born: 1821; Barnstable, Massachusetts, U.S.
- Died: September 27, 1896; Salem, Massachusetts, U.S.
- Occupation: hymnwriter
- Period: 19th-century
- Notable works: Hymns and Sonnets, by E S.
- Relatives: Edmund Hamilton Sears; Horace E. Scudder

Eliza Scudder (1821–1896) was a 19th-century American hymnwriter. Among her productions are several notable hymns including, "The Love of God", written in 1852; "Truth", which begins with the line, "Thou long disowned, reviled, oppressed"; "Lines for Music", which begins with "As the lost who vainly wander"; and the lyric poem, "The Vesper Hymn", written in 1874. Scudder was undoubtedly influenced by her uncle, Edmund Hamilton Sears, the author of "It Came Upon the Midnight Clear".

== Early life ==
Eliza Scudder was born at Barnstable, Massachusetts, in 1821. She was the daughter of Eliza (Bacon) and Elisha Gage Scudder. Both parents were from Barnstable on Cape Cod. Her father was a merchant in Boston and died when she was but an infant. Her mother lived till 1869. Her sister Rebecca, three years her senior, married, in 1845, Samuel Page Andrews, living first in Framingham, Massachusetts, and afterward in Salem, where Mr. Andrews was for many years clerk of the municipal court. Salem thus became one of Scudder's homes. There was a long period in the younger sister's childhood when she suffered from an affection of the eyes which never was wholly relieved, almost wholly cut off for long stretches of time from reading or from looking on the paper when she wrote. During this early period, she enjoyed the companionship of her sister. Something of the deep feeling she had for her was written into the verses, "The Laburnum", a dedicatory poem.

Scudder's uncle was the Unitarian divine, Edmund Hamilton Sears, known as the author of two Christmas hymns, "Calm on the Listening Ear of Night," and "It Came Upon the Midnight Clear". Horace E. Scudder, for some years editor of The Atlantic Monthly, was a relative of hers.

== Career ==
Endowed with a religious nature, Scudder early on was influenced by church life, and was received as a member of the Trinitarian division of the Congregational order. But as time passed, she found herself reexamining the foundations of her religious belief, and as a result, she disagreed with the formulas of Calvinism. Drawn by her sympathy with the antislavery movement, in which she took an active part, she became a disciple of Gerrit Smith, and developed a companionship with Lydia Maria Child and others. This not only quickened her intellectually, but opened a way into a spiritual freedom which seemed unbounded by any dogmatic statement. Without connecting herself formally with the Unitarian denomination, she found herself more at home there than elsewhere. Still, the expression in such hymns as "The Love of God" and "The New Heaven" indicates that her thought was more aligned with a mystic self-effacement of a spiritual reality outside of and beyond herself. This change in her religious affiliation brought with it the distress of alienating friends who disapproved of her Scudder's viewpoints. In spite of making new friends, she was very much alone, and in the "Epitaph on an Old Maid", she gave expression to the sort of regard she had for herself as she stood a little off in poetic mood, recognizing her own detachment.

During these years, Scudder impressed herself strongly on new friends. She was restless, and had a singleness of purpose in her dominant religiousness, which was directed toward finding truth. In ordinary matters, she lost herself in her friendships and in God. The two poems, "Truth" and "The Quest", record this temper. Her verses, "Out of the Shadow", reflect her most intimate thought of herself during this period of her life.

When she came to hear and to know Phillips Brooks, the message which he delivered at once caught Scudder's imagination. He brought the message which changed Scudder's religious views and afterwards gave her contentment as a communicant of the Protestant Episcopal Church. With him, she found more understanding than she had previously known. Her "Lines for Music" and her "Vesper Hymn" both contain an air of divine contentment. Seeing the church as her home, she became an associate of the Society of Saint Margaret. She experienced a very decided change in her intellectual conception of religious truth, and a deepening of her apprehension of the Incarnation.

Early on, Scudder's various poems and hymns had been handed about in manuscript. "The Love of God" ("Thou grace divine, encircling all."), written in 1852, found its way to her uncle, Rev. E. H. Sears. He included it in his Pictures of the Olden Time, as shown in the Fortunes of a Family of the Pilgrims, 1857. Other pieces were published in Sears's Monthly Religious Magazine, and gradually were added into one hymnbook after another. Four of Scudder's pieces were included in Hymns of the Spirit. Eight of her pieces were in the Schaff-Gilman Library of Religious Poetry, in which volume it is stated that the Scudder's hymns and other poetry had not then (1880) been collected. Later that year, she put out Hymns and Sonnets, by E S., printed in Boston, and published by Lockwood, Brooks & Co. The little collection of 1880 is rarer than it seemed, for it was printed from type, and the edition was soon exhausted. Dr. Putnam's Singers and Songs of the Liberal Faith does not disclose her name, for the reason that while, at the writing of "Thou grace divine, encircling all.", she was an attendant upon the Unitarian ministry, she had for something like fifteen years past, been a communicant in the Protestant Episcopal Church. Some of her memorable pieces include "Truth", which with the line, "Thou long disowned, reviled, oppressed."; "Lines for Music", its first line being "As the lost who vainly wander"; and one of Scudder's best productions, the lyric poem "The Vesper Hymn", written in 1874, its first line being, "The day is done; the weary day of thought and toil is past".

== Death and legacy ==
For some years, she lived in Boston, and later in life, made her home at Salem. The last few years of Scudder's life saw her compelled to move north and south as the seasons changed, and to be separated frequently from her sister. On September 27, 1896, Eliza's sister died after a very brief illness. Eliza left the house and went to her cousin's home, near by. In a few hours, Eliza was dead, too. The sisters were buried side by side in the graveyard at Weston, Massachusetts.

Posthumously that year, Horace Scudder edited a small volume of her poems entitled Hymns and Sonnets, published by Houghton, Mifflin & Co., Boston. In the preface he remarks:—

"There is an interval of fifty years between the first and last poem. But the same spiritual fire burned in the later and earlier, and we think we are not carried away by enthusiasm when we say that there is a quality of spiritual passion in Miss Scudder's poems and religious fervor which we find nowhere in the range of English poetry except in Miss Rossetti's."

== Selected works ==
- "Epitaph on an Old Maid"
- "Lines for Music"
- "Out of the Shadow"
- "The Laburnum"
- "The Love of God"
- "The New Heaven"
- "The Quest"
- "The Transcendence of God"
- "Truth"
- "Vesper Hymn"
