= Sturgis Charter Public School =

- 427 Main Street (East); 41.651837°N 70.285178°W; 125 West Main Street (West); 41.646051°N 70.300759°W; Hyannis, Massachusetts

Information
- Type: Charter high school
- Motto: International Baccalaureate for All (Independence of Thought, Generosity of Spirit (1998-2004); Student Learning is Why We Are Here (unofficial))
- Established: 1998 as Sturgis Charter School
- School district: Sturgis Charter Public School
- Head teacher: Paul Marble (2016-Present)
- Faculty: 36.8 (on FTE basis)
- Grades: 9 - 12
- Enrollment: 743.3 (East & West)
- Student to teacher ratio: 10.0
- Colors: East - Blue & White West - Green & White
- Athletics conference: Cape and Islands Small School
- Mascot: East - "Storm" West - "Navigators"
- Information: 508-778-1782
- Website: School website

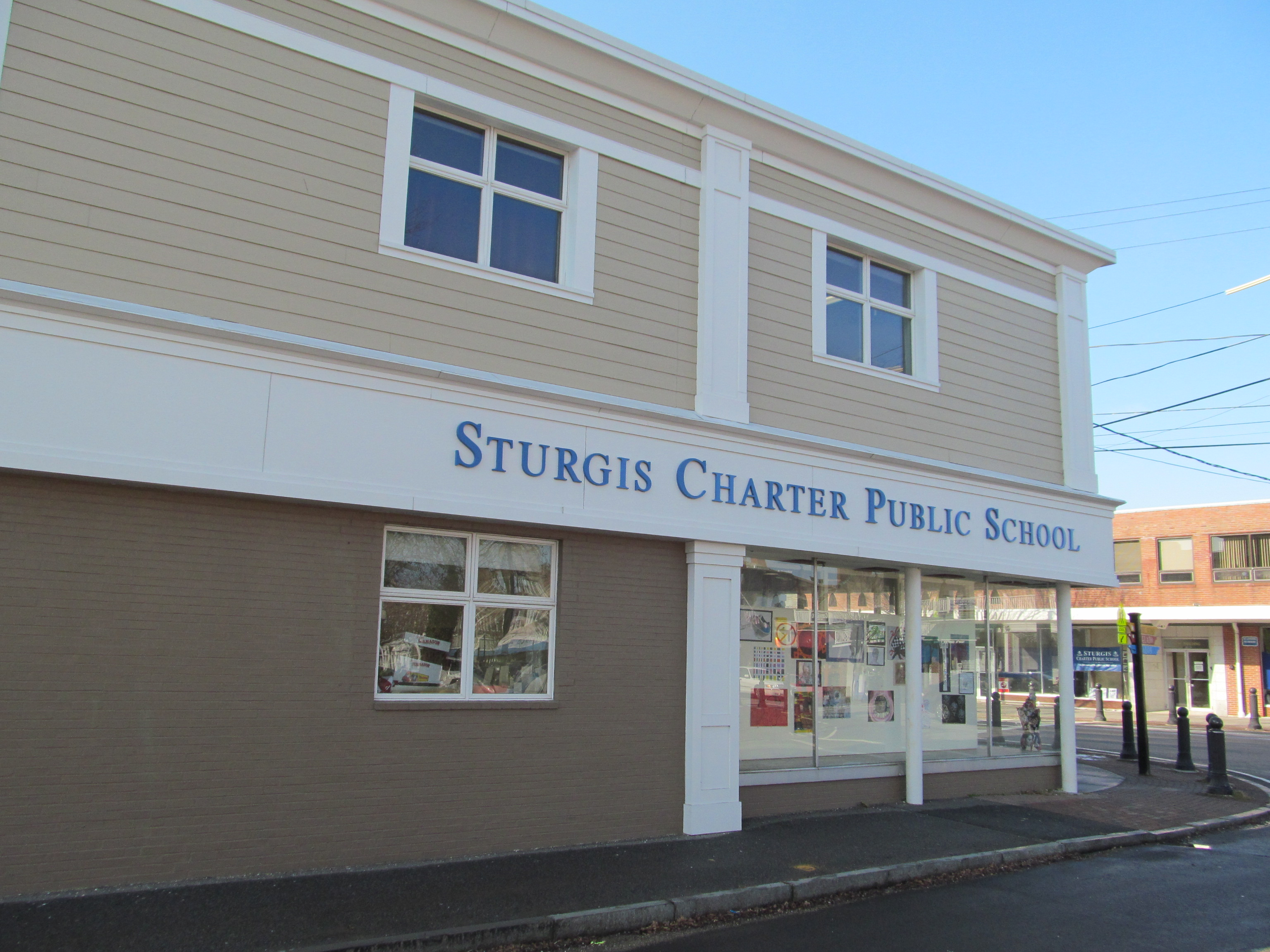
Sturgis Charter Public School

The Sturgis Charter Public School is a dual-campus charter school located in the village of Hyannis, Massachusetts (Town of Barnstable, MA), United States. The school received its charter in February 1998 and opened in September for the 1998–1999 academic year with 162 freshman, 15 faculty and staff, a newly renovated facility, and a $1.2 million budget. The school philosophy is International Baccalaureate for all students.

== History ==
For its first six years, the school was known as Sturgis Charter School. In 2004, the Sturgis board changed the school's name to "Sturgis Charter Public School," in keeping with a public relations initiative of the Massachusetts Charter School Association. According to the enabling legislation for Massachusetts charter schools, a "charter" school is by statutory definition a public school. Sturgis determined that many people were unaware of this and thus added the term "Public" for clarity.

In 2010, Sturgis decided to open a new campus on West Main Street in Hyannis, only a few blocks from the original campus. However, the campus was not built until 2012, and both schools shared space on Main Street until the new school was constructed. This new campus came to be known as "Sturgis West", while the original campus on Main Street in Hyannis came to be known as "Sturgis East", basically dividing the Sturgis campus into two separate schools. Both the East & West campuses field their own athletic teams (although some teams include students from both campuses). The campuses each have their own mascots, and their own school colors and compete against each other in all sports offered at both schools. Sturgis East's mascot name is the "Storm", and their colors are navy blue and white. Sturgis West's mascot name is the "Navigators", and their colors are green and white.

As of the 2008–09 school year, the school had an enrollment of 367 students and 36.8 classroom teachers (on an FTE basis), for a student-teacher ratio of 10.0.

== Organization ==
=== Campuses ===
As a result of the success and popularity of the “International Baccalaureate for All” program, student admission waiting lists swelled to more than 400 students for the 2011–12 school year. As a result, The Sturgis Board has developed a second campus in Hyannis that replicates the Sturgis mission of IB for All and the vibrant school culture.

The proposed second campus at 125 West Main Street in Hyannis earned the new school the name Sturgis West. A temporary location for the Sturgis West campus was used for the 2011–12 school year at the former Artifacts Furniture building at 434 Main Street in Hyannis. Construction crews began work in April 2011 so that the facility would be ready in August 2012 for approximately 220 new freshman and sophomore students and approximately 30 staff members. A significant majority of the faculty for the second campus has been recruited from outside of the school—only a few school leaders will come from the original Sturgis faculty.

The original campus at 427 Main Street has been designated Sturgis East by the administration.

Both the Sturgis East and Sturgis West campuses have their own athletic teams, school mascot, and school colors and compete against each other in all sports, along with other area high schools. Sturgis East's mascot name is the "Storm", and their colors are navy blue and white. Sturgis West's mascot name is the "Navigators" otherwise known as the Sturgis Gator, and their colors are green and white.

=== Governance ===
The Sturgis Board of Trustees governs the school, and the executive director oversees the educational program. Each campus has a principal.

== Awards and recognition ==
As of 2016, the School is listed under the "gold medal" list, ranking 33 out of the top 100 high schools in the United States and first in Massachusetts (more than 20,000 public high schools from 50 states and the District of Columbia were analyzed) by U.S. News & World Report magazine.

In 2010, Newsweek magazine ranked Sturgis 29th in the nation in their annual ranking of America's top public high schools. The magazine's ranking was based exclusively on the number of AP and IB tests taken divided by the number of graduating seniors but is currently based on "six components: graduation rate (25%), college matriculation rate (25%), AP tests taken per graduate (25%), average SAT/ACT scores (10%), average AP/IB/AICE scores (10%), and AP courses offered (5%)".

Year	Newsweek Ranking
2014	31
2012	15
2011	31
2010	29
2009	28
2008	43
2007	55

== International Baccalaureate ==
In 2004, the Sturgis Charter Public School became an International Baccalaureate World School, offering the Diploma Program (DP) to students in the 11th and 12th grades, along with an intensive "pre-IB" program in the 9th and 10th grades. Sturgis is one of thirteen schools in Massachusetts that offer the IB Diploma Program.

== Extracurricular activities ==
- There are several school clubs and other extracurricular activities available at Sturgis. Some of the most prominent school clubs include: Student Council, StormWatch (school newspaper) Mock Trial, ski club, guitar club, Sturgis Singers (an afterschool auditioned group), Half Step Down (A cappella group), hiking and backpacking club, Ancient Greek Club, the Sojourners, Film Club, Surf Club, S.T.A.G.E. (Sturgis Theater and Arts Guild of Entertainers, an acting group), Awkward Blocking (the school's first improvisational comedy troupe), a Model United Nations club, Gay-straight alliance, jazz band, several choruses, and a string ensemble. There is also a Chess Team and a Key Club.
- Sports at Sturgis include: Boys and Girls Soccer, Field Hockey, Cross Country, Boys and Girls Basketball, Cheerleading, Boys and Girls Tennis, Lacrosse, Golf, Baseball, Softball, Sailing and Volleyball.

A joint Track and Field program was also established between Sturgis East and West back in 2015.
