= Eden White =

American singer-songwriter

- Born: Eden White; Providence, Rhode Island, US
- Origin: Massachusetts, USA
- Genres: Rock, Alternative
- Occupation: Singer-songwriter
- Instrument: Vocals
- Years active: 1993–2000
- Labels: Zero Hour, Delirium

Eden White (born 1970) is a New York City singer-songwriter. She is the daughter of Janice White and Dr. Allen White, both from Massachusetts. After graduating from Barnstable High School, she attended Tufts University near her home in Boston, Mass. In 1993, she started touring clubs in New York city and earned a cult following. In 1996, Eden served as the musical director of School House Rock, Live! off Broadway at the Atlantic Theatre in NYC, which then had an additional run at the Lamb's Theatre in Times Square. In 1998, she released her first record, This is the Way, under the label Zero Hour. She also released the song This is the Way as a single under the dual label of Delirium Records and Touchwood. By 2000, she had signed on with Delirium Records to release her second CD, What Really Matters.

She is married to Jed Morey, president of the Morey Organization. In 2000, she won the Light on the Hill Award with Hank Azaria.

== Discography ==
- This Is the Way, (October 6, 1998)
  1. Song Unsung
  2. This Is the Way – Also released as a single
  3. Twisted
  4. Gold
  5. Let Me In
  6. Hungry
  7. Nice
  8. Deep Inside
  9. Make a Difference
  10. Try to Change You
  11. Through the Glass
- What Really Matters, (November 15, 2000)
  1. Hey, Hey Father
  2. Jessica
  3. Better This Time
  4. Everything I Feel
  5. Twirling
  6. Just Nobody Good Enough
  7. Hypocrite
  8. Tired
  9. Since You Walked Away
  10. March On
  11. Letter by Letter (Song for Anne)
  12. Prelude to Goodbye
  13. Goodbye
