= William and Jane Phinney House =

Historic house in Massachusetts, United States

- U.S. National Register of Historic Places
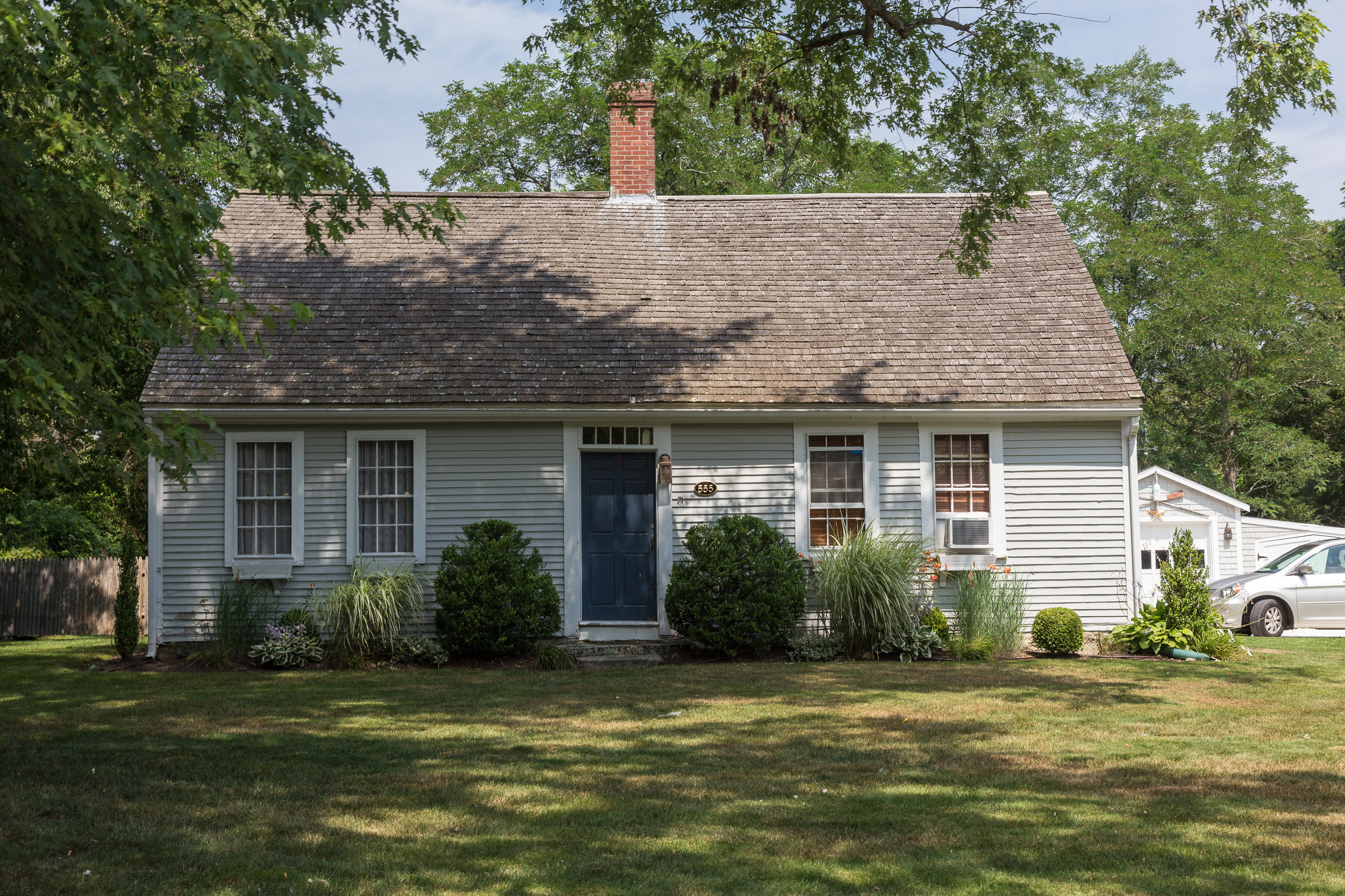
- William and Jane Phinney House in 2014

- Location within Cape Cod Location within Massachusetts Location within the United States
- Location: 555 Phinney's Lane, Barnstable, Massachusetts
- Coordinates: 41°39′47″N 70°19′42″W
- Built: 1730
- Architect: Phinney, William
- MPS: Barnstable MRA
- NRHP reference No.: 87000284
- Added to NRHP: March 13, 1987

The William and Jane Phinney House is a historic house at 555 Phinney's Lane in the Centerville area of Barnstable, Massachusetts. Built c. 1659 later enlarged to a 3/4 cape in 1715, it is the oldest surviving house in the village, and has an early surviving example of a bowed roof, a distinctive regional variation on the Cape style house. The house was listed on the National Register of Historic Places in 1987.

== Description and history ==
The William and Jane Phinney House stands in the northern part of the village of Centerville, on the north side of Phinney's Lane at its junction with Richard's Lane. It is a 1 1/2-story wood-frame structure, with a bowed gable roof, central chimney, and clapboarded exterior. It has a symmetrical five-bay facade, with a center entrance that has a four-light transom window above. Structural timbers are exposed in its interior, which also retains other original 18th-century features. The only major alterations have been the addition of electricity and plumbing.

By local tradition, research and historical documentation, the oldest portion of this building is a "half Cape" (three bays wide) built about 1659 centered around the three bay chimney. Later in about 1715, the home was expanded up to accommodate two additional bedrooms, one attached to the chimney and has its own fireplace. It was built by Deacon John Phinney, its first owner, in a part of Centerville that was one of the earliest areas to be settled by European colonists. It is significant as an early example of a bowed roof, a notable regional variant often associated with carpenters experienced in the shipbuilding trade. In 2005, the owners had expanded the home by adding a 1200 sqft addition to the rear of the home as not to impede the visual front. The addition made way for a large master bedroom and large living room. The home is currently owned by real estate agent John DeLellis, a local realtor involved with the Centerville Civic Society and historic preservation.

== See also ==
- National Register of Historic Places listings in Barnstable County, Massachusetts
