= Joseph Hull =

American settler in Massachusetts (1596–1665)

Rev. Joseph Hull (1596–1665) led a congregation of 104 from England to Massachusetts in 1635. He founded the Cape Cod town of Barnstable in 1639 and served as one of Maine’s earliest ministers. Hull's willingness to preach without approval from church officials and his efforts to chart a middle course between Anglicans and Puritans resulted in repeated conflicts with religious and colonial authorities.

== England: 1596–1635 ==
Baptized on 25 April 1596, Joseph Hull was the youngest son of yeoman Thomas Hull and Joane Peson of Crewkerne, Somerset. He began his studies at St. Mary's College, Oxford, on 22 May 1612 and earned a bachelor's degree on 14 November 1614. He was ordained as a deacon by Bishop William Cotton of Exeter on 23 May 1619 in the Parish Church of St. Mary the Virgin, Silverton, Devon, and was appointed rector of St. Giles' Church, Northleigh, Devon, on 28 March 1622. He would serve the parish 11 years.

Hull's first wife, whose name is unknown, died during or soon after the birth of her seventh child in 1632. Hull married Agnes (surname unknown) in St. Cuthbert's Church, Wells on 13 March 1633 and resigned at North Leigh the following day. In April, he began working as a curate in the Broadway Parish, Somerset. Hull's decision to return to his native Somerset might have ensured relatives were available to support Agnes, then 23, as she became stepmother to a large family of young children.

Throughout his career, Hull refused to allow those in "ecclesiastical authority over him" to dictate when and where he could minister. In September 1629, wardens of the Crewkerne parish had been cited for allowing Hull and two other ministers to preach without license and without registration in the parish's Book of Strange Preachers. In January 1635, Hull reportedly preached in Glastonbury, “saying that judgment hung over the land and that first it would fall on the clergy and then the laity.” That same month, he was prosecuted for preaching without license. Hull failed to respond to the charges, and in February 1635, he was expelled from the Church of England. Before the end of the following month, the 40-year-old minister had gathered a congregation of 104 and set sail for New England.

== Massachusetts Bay: 1635–1639 ==
The Hull Company left Weymouth, Dorset, on 20 March 1635. Among them were a chandler, clothier, and cooper, eight husbandmen, twelve servants, two tailors, a salter, and a weaver. The Hulls were accompanied by three servants, the most for a single family. Hull signed the passenger list “boldly” as “Joseph Hull, Minister,” unlike many Puritan pastors who emigrated under assumed names.

The group arrived in Dorchester, Massachusetts, on 7 June 1635, fifteen years after Pilgrims established Plymouth Plantation and five years after Puritans founded the Bay Colony, seeking the freedom to practice their religion without fear of persecution, a liberty they would not grant to others. On 8 July 1635, John Winthrop noted in his journal, “At this court Wessagusset was made a plantation and Mr. Hull, a minister of England, and twenty-one families with him allowed to sit down there.”

Native Wessagusset had been “nearly depopulated” by the Great Dying, beginning in 1616 when contact with early Europeans sparked waves of infectious disease for which Americans had no immunity. Tens of thousands died in the nations between today's southern Maine and Rhode Island. For King James, it was a “wondrous plague” that allowed the English to appropriate vast tracts of land—including cultivated acres and buildings—without purchase. In 1634, Winthrop observed, “For the natives, they are near all dead of the smallpox, so the Lord hath cleared our title to what we possess.” On 2 September 1635, the General Court in Boston changed the name of Wessagusset to Weymouth after the Hull Company's port of departure and made Hull a freeman. He received the town's largest land grant on 12 June 1636.

The village had a small English population when the Hull Company arrived. Some had been among the first successful settlers in 1623. Under the leadership of Sir Ferdinando Gorges, these colonists were more theologically liberal than the Puritans who joined them beginning in 1630. If Hull “hoped to bridge the gap between Anglicans and Puritans,” he found his efforts rejected by both sides. From 1635 until 1644, “there was almost constant tumult and disturbance” in the village, “sometimes so serious as to draw the attention of the General Court.” “The agitations showed themselves principally in the church and upon ecclesiastical matters.”

“Dissention quickly arose” between Hull and the village's Puritans, likely “instigated by the authorities outside,” and, in less than a year, they had called Rev. Thomas Jenner to be their pastor. At the same time, Hull's willingness to adopt a Puritan practice caused “tension” with Weymouth's traditional Anglicans. Like nearly all Massachusetts ministers, he required prospective congregants to give a “testimony of spiritual experience” before they could join the church and have access to the sacraments. When new emigrant Rev. Robert Lenthall agreed to make baptism the only “door to the church,” some Weymouth residents asked him to join them. Yet another minister, Rev. Samuel Newman, was soon “summoned to heal the breach.” Thus, by 1637, “there were no less than four claimants for the Weymouth pulpit, each with a strong party at his command.”

In 1637, Hull “relinquished his charge and withdrew.” After “a brief season of preaching at Bass River, now Beverly, he gave up his ministerial labor.” Moving to adjoining Hingham, he was granted a five-acre house lot and 45 acres which he used to graze cattle. The ecclesiastic chaos had not cost him “the confidence of his fellow townsmen.” He was appointed a local magistrate in 1638 and was elected to serve as the settlement's Deputy to the General Court on 7 September 1638 and 13 March 1639. Hull's years in the Bay Colony ended when he received permission from Plymouth to found a colonial settlement on Cape Cod. He delivered a “farewell sermon,” likely in Hingham, on 5 May 1639.

== Cape Cod: 1639–1641 ==
To encourage development and defense, colonial officials granted large swaths of Native land to their fellow Englishmen. The Cape Cod village of Mattakeese was prized for its soil's “adaptation to the raising of grain, much of the land being already cleared by the Indians” who had long “successfully cultivated it.” When the original English grantee failed to establish a settlement, Plymouth eradicated his claim and granted the land to Hull and Thomas Dimmock, who led the first group of colonists to Mattakeese in May 1639. They changed the name of the village and established the town of Barnstable in June. Hull and Dimmock held nearly all offices and shared the responsibility of parceling house lots and acreage. “No appeal from their decisions was ever made,” and they “seemed to possess the entire confidence of the people."

In October, a large influx of families arrived under the leadership of Rev. John Lothrop after their church in Scituate split in a controversy over baptism. In December, Hull and Dimmock were elected as Barnstable's Deputies to the General Court. On 11 December 1639, a service of thanksgiving and a feast were held at Hull's house. Communal praise quickly gave way to “controversy,” which “turned primarily on the conflicting loyalties and interests of the people who had come to Barnstable from different places.” Hull and his followers founded the town, but the Scituate settlers brought “a population large enough to support a congregation, and Lothrop expected to be its minister.”

Ideally, each Puritan church would have two ministers who led worship and administered sacraments: a pastor and a teacher. In Barnstable, neither role went to Hull. Lothrop served as pastor, and on 15 April 1640, Rev. John Mayo was invested as the church's teaching elder when “Mr. Hull and brother Cobb” joined Lothrop in the ritual of laying on hands. Denied a role in ministry, Hull was also “dropped from his position as deputy” to the colony court. In 1640, only a year after founding Barnstable, “Hull does not appear to have held any office.” Without a ministerial salary, he again turned to “agriculture, especially the ranging of cattle and horses for market.”

Early in 1641, residents of neighboring Yarmouth asked him to establish a second church in their settlement. In Puritan practice, members pledged not to leave a church without the consent of its ministers and congregation. Hull accepted Yarmouth's call without obtaining this consent, just as he had accepted invitations to preach in England without obtaining permission from Anglican authorities.

“Hull was in trouble from the beginning.” Apparently in retaliation, he was sued by a number of men in Lothrop's congregation for trespass or debt, but Lothrop himself wielded the biggest weapon. Under his leadership, the Barnstable Church excommunicated Hull on 1 May 1641 “for his willful breaking of communion with us and joining himself a member with a company in Yarmouth to be their Pastor; contrary to the advice and Counsel of our Church.” Lothrop didn't limit his vengeance to Hull. Some of Hull’s Barnstable friends and former congregants joined him in Yarmouth. Lothrop's register “records a number of excommunications of its members, far more than one would expect, and for reasons which hint of retribution.” Hull's wife Agnes experienced “the same stern discipline.”

A ”dreaded censure,” excommunication held “great weight since excommunicated church members could not participate in communion, … bringing with it the terrifying consequence of eternal damnation.” In Puritan practice, if individuals were “duly” excommunicated from one congregation, they were deemed “unfit” to be members of any congregation. However, “each church reserved to itself the right to make trial of each case of excommunication,” and if it determined another church had proceeded wrongly, “it could hold communion with an excommunicate.” Individuals censured by Barnstable could thus receive the sacrament from Hull in Yarmouth.

“When Lothrop's spate of excommunications had no perceptible effect, the power of the civil magistrates was invoked.” On 8 March 1642, Plymouth Colony ordered that “a warrant shall be directed to the constable of Yarmouth, to apprehend Mr. Joseph Hull (if he do either exercise the ministry amongst them or administer the seals [sacraments]), to bring him before the next magistrate, to find sufficient sureties for his appearance the next General Court, to answer his doings (being an excommunicant)." “[N]o allegation of immorality or unsoundness of doctrine” was ever made against Hull, “but he was dealt with as rigorously as if there had been.”

The warrant appears to have disbanded Hull's congregation, cutting its members off from communion. Agnes Hull was pregnant with her fourth child during the turmoil, and the Hull family knew all too well the mortal dangers of childbirth. On 11 March 1642, she returned to the Barnstable Church, “renouncing” her decision to join the Yarmouth congregation and “confessing her evil in so doing with sorrow,” according to Lothrop's note in the parish register.

Hull had likely continued his agricultural work while preaching in Yarmouth. But by spring 1642, the “New England economy was turning downward.” Cattle bought at £10 a head in 1640 could not be sold for £5 in 1642, and Hull's livestock business “collapse[d].” Banned from ministry in Massachusetts, Hull left his wife and children in Barnstable and travelled north, seeking work in Maine.

== Maine: 1642–1647 ==
Unlike Massachusetts, Maine was founded as an economic, not a religious venture. Like Hull, Maine Gov. Thomas Gorges sought a moderate, tolerant path in church matters. In 1640, he was asked about Maine's religious policy in a letter from Rev. John Wheelwright, who had been banished from Massachusetts alongside his sister-in-law Anne Hutchinson. Gorges explained the province “steered as near we could to the course of England for ecclesiastical,” but “required no man” to follow the Book of Common Prayer or Church of England ceremonies, “but allowed the Liberty of Conscience.”

In 1640, the Maine General Court at Saco convicted Rev. George Burdet of “often soliciting” women to his “incontinent practices and persuading them by scriptures to satisfy his insatiable lust.” Gorges “spent much effort in attempting to obtain a more worthy successor to the sinful minister.” In 1641, at least two possible replacements fell through. Hull's ministry in Maine was both needed and welcomed.

Although the date of his arrival in the province is uncertain, Hull was preaching in Agamenticus (later York) by May 1642 when Gov. Gorges received a letter from William Vassall of Scituate, apparently explaining that members of Hull's Yarmouth congregation had been excommunicated for choosing him as their minister. Gorges began his 17 May 1642 reply with his admission that the contents of Vassall's letter “somewhat startle” him: “Sorry I am that they … have exposed themselves to reproof for hearing [Mr. Hull] preach whom to hear we account it a happiness. As for … neighbors here I shall not press their consciences but leave them to their own liberty.” Noting that “Any Church may and do err,” Gorges assured Vassall that he and Hull “should most willingly join with you in the request of a fair hearing of the differences before indifferent men,” but added, “we living at such a distance I see not how it can well be effected. I shall hearken after your advice and readily embrace any motions whereby peace may be settled.”

Hull remained in Maine. Because “the Anglican concept of parish included all within its boundaries,” he ministered in both mainland Agamenticus and in fishing villages on the rocky cluster of islands six miles from shore known as the Isles of Shoals. Hull led worship in a brick meetinghouse on Smuttynose Island, “possibly the first church in the province” when built in 1640. He was still in the province on 17 April 1643, when he witnessed a land deed from Gorges to Wheelwright.

Word of Hull's ministry in Maine reached Winthrop by 10 May 1643, when he cited it as one of the reasons he decided not to invite Maine to join the New England Confederation: “Those of Sir Ferdinando Gorge and his province, beyond Pascataquack, were not received nor called into confederation, because they ran a different course from us both in their ministry and civil administration; for they had lately made Acomenticus (a poor village) a corporation, and had made a tailor their mayor, and had entertained one Hull, an excommunicated person and very contentious, for their minister.” Historian James Adams argues Winthrop's real reason was his plan to seize the vast tract: “To have allowed its inhabitants representation … would have been to acknowledge their right to be considered an independent colony.”

Winthrop's claim that Hull was “very contentious” is belied by facts. Although Hull stood firm in his determination to minister without seeking permission from authorities, he withdrew from conflict in England, Weymouth, Barnstable, and Yarmouth, as he would in Maine. And despite all that Lothrop had done to turn church and state against him, Hull chose to reconcile with the Barnstable congregation when he returned to Cape Cod in summer 1643. On 10 August, according to Lothrop's parish record, “Mr. Hull in the acknowledging of his sin, & renewing his covenant was received again into fellowship with us.” Hull soon returned to Maine, accompanied by his wife and children.

Documents establish the Hulls' presence in Maine, including Winthrop's 30 October 1644 journal entry referring to Hull as the village's minister and a 19 July 1645 land deed witnessed by Joseph and Agnes Hull. His ministry on the Shoals is noted by Cotton Mather, who includes Hull in the “first class” of New England ministers. The family's time in Maine offered a respite from controversy, but it proved brief. Sir Ferdinando Gorges died in May 1647, and Massachusetts quickly began consolidating its power over his province. “As one of its first measures,” Winthrop sent Puritan John Brock to replace Hull.

Hounded out of a fourth pulpit by Puritans in ten years, Hull decided to return to England, apparently to stay. Hull's son-in-law John Bickford would later testify that when Joseph and Agnes “went for England,” they left their “very young” children behind. Hull's first four children were then 21 or older. It's likely they had some role in raising their younger siblings, although evidence suggests that at least one child—Naomi, then 7—lived with an unrelated family.

== Cornwall: 1648–1662 ==
Although Hull had been among the most “unsettled” of the early New England ministers, he “settled well as a parish minister in Cornwall,” further evidence that “his wanderings in New England arose more from a failure to get matched with a congenial community than from unorthodox opinions.”

Hull returned to a church and a country much changed since the outbreak of war in 1642. Archbishop William Laud, whose efforts to impose uniformity of worship “precipitated the slide to Civil War,” had been beheaded in 1645. The following year, Parliament abolished the episcopacy, the hierarchy of bishops that governed the English Church. “During the course of the war, Puritan opinion became increasingly radicalised. Initially two broad groupings emerged in Parliament: the moderate Presbyterians and the more radical Independents.” When Hull “applied for a preaching post in Cornwall, he produced certificates from two ministers with good local ties but very different outlooks”: the “leading Presbyterian in the south-west,” George Hughes, and “hawkish Independent” Hugh Peter. Historians differ in their characterization of Hull's own theological views. Susan Hardman Moore and Kenneth Hyde describe him as Presbyterian, Sir Alfred Robbins identifies him as Independent, and Gilbert Nash writes that he was an "independent with Episcopalian antecedents" who became a “moderate dissenter.”

In 1648, Hull became the vicar of St. Mary Magdalene's Church in Launceston. Regarded as “the most impressive and beautiful late medieval church in Cornwall,” its exterior is completely covered in detailed carvings. The difference between its grandeur and a rustic brick chapel on tiny Smuttynose can't be overstated. Hull's name first appears in St. Mary Magdalene's parish register on 23 January 1649 when his son Reuben was baptized.

The Launceston register includes records of a Hull child's baptism or birth “at almost yearly intervals” from 1649 to 1654 and contains clues about Hull's theology. In his decision to record the 1654 birth of his son John, rather than his baptism, Hull followed Puritan practice. Entries in a later hand “directed against Puritans” included changes made to the entry for Ephraim Hull's 1650 baptism. The infant's first name was “partially obliterated,” and the entry was changed to read, “The 25th was Bap. Cuckold sonne of Mr Joseph Hull.”

Puritans held power in 1655, and evidence that Hull was in their favor “comes from the fact that the Council of State in October 30th, 1655, approved an Augmentation of £50 certified by the Trustees for the maintenance of Ministers to Jos. Hull, minister of Launceston, co. Cornwall." On 20 December 1655, Hull “proved his devotion to the ruling powers by assisting in the celebration of the first civil marriage at Launceston.” A “further sum of fifty pounds was granted by the Council on a similar recommendation for the maintenance of the Launceston minister” on 25 December 1655. Comparatively, Hull's grants were particularly high.

Hull's October augmentation followed a 16 August 1655 request from John Tingcombe to the clerk of Cromwell's Council. Explaining that Hull had no previous augmentation, he added, “'Tis hoped that the man is godly. He has a very greate charge of children, neare twenty, some say more.” As noted, however, Hull's 13 or 14 children born prior to his appointment in Cornwall lived in New England, and of the five Hull infants born in Launceston, only one survived to return with the couple in 1662. Presumably, Tingcombe would have known this, writing as he did from Launceston. Perhaps the Hulls found ways to get funds to the children they left behind.

In April 1656, Hull became the minister of St. Buryan's and St. Sennen's Churches, west of Launceston. There he came into conflict with Quakers who refused to pay tithes to the state church. The “Book of Sufferings” of the Land's End Meeting reports that men who “farmed the tithe of the priest of Sennan” imprisoned Friends and seized their property. In 1658, Quaker James Myers testified that he attempted to speak with Hull and would have been “beaten by the priest” if Hull's wife had not intervened. Friends founder George Fox visited the Meeting in 1659. In a letter to Cornwall parishes and magistrates, he objected to the local practice of scavenging shipwrecks and asked, “priest Hull, are these thy fruits? … Hast thou taught them no better manners and conversation, who are so brutish and heathenish?”

Hull's tenure at St. Buryan ended in 1662 with the Restoration of the Monarchy. Loyalist Robert Creighton had been ousted as St. Buryan's dean during the First Civil War. He successfully “petitioned for restoration,” and Hull lost his living. Hull was also among the 2,000-2,500 ministers “ejected” from the Church of England following passage of the Act of Uniformity 1662. It made the Book of Common Prayer the “only legal form of worship” throughout England; “adherence was mandatory for anyone who wished to hold a position in the church or in the government.”

== Maine: 1662–1665 ==
In 1662, Joseph and Agnes Hull made their third trans-Atlantic crossing and stayed first in Oyster River (Durham), New Hampshire, where a number of their children were living. Hull preached in Oyster River, but was not formally appointed as the church's minister. According to George Bishop's 1667 polemic New England Judged by the Spirit of the Lord, two women from the local Quaker Meeting went to “Priest Hull's place of worship,” and disrupted “the Old Man” as he preached.

Hull returned to Maine in 1662-63. With Winthrop some dozen years dead, there was no political interference when Hull was selected to replace the man once sent to take his job, Rev. John Brock. The Hulls made their home on Appledore (Hog) Island, where the Shoals' population was then centered, and Hull returned to preaching in the brick chapel on nearby Smuttynose. It must have been a labor of love. The Isles of Shoals owed him £20 “for his ministry” when he died at age 70 on 19 November 1665. His place of burial is unknown.

Acting as administrator, Agnes Hull filed the inventory of his possessions on 5 December 1665. Without back pay, his estate was valued at 32 pounds, 5 shillings, 5 pence, including only 6 shillings in cash. Far outstripping all other items in value were “his books.” At £10, they represented nearly a third of his wealth.

== Works cited ==
- Adams, James Truslow. The Founding of New England. Atlantic Monthly Press, 1921.
- Alsbury, Colin. Undignified Exits: A colorful selection of tales of local 17th-century clergy who found themselves out of a living. Bishop Ken Memorial Lecture, 2003.
- Anderson, Robert et al. "Joseph Hull." Great Migration: Immigrants to New England 1634-35, New England Historical and Genealogical Society, 1999, 452-59.
- Banks, Charles E. History of York Maine. Calkins Press, 1931.
- Bishop, George. New England Judged, By the Spirit of the Lord. Sowle, 1703.
- Blish, James Knox. Genealogy of the Blish Family in America, 1637-1905. JK Blish, 1905.
- Brown, David C. (1994). “The Keys of the Kingdom: Excommunication in Colonial Massachusetts.” New England Quarterly Vol. 67, No. 4, p. 531-566.
- Calamy, Edmund and Samuel Palmer. The Nonconformist's Memorial Being an Account of the Ministers, who Were Ejected or Silenced After the Restoration. Volume 1, W. Harris, 1775.
- Chamberlain, George Walter. History of Weymouth, Massachusetts. Vol. 3-4, Higginson, 1923.
- Chatfield, Donald F. The Congregationalism of New England and Its Repercussions in England and Scotland, 1641-1662. PhD Thesis, University of Edenborough, 1963.
- Clayton, W. Woodford. History of York County, Maine. Everts and Peck, 1880.
- First Parish [Dover.] The First Parish in Dover, New Hampshire: Two Hundred and Fiftieth Anniversary, October 28, 1883. First Parish, 1884.
- Fox, George. George Fox’s Journal, edited by Percy L. Parker, Isbister, 1903.
- Freeman, Frederick. The History of Cape Cod: The Annals of Barnstable County and of Its Several Towns, Including the District of Mashpee. Volume 2, 1862.
- Hughes, Phyllis J. "Common Errors in the Joseph Hull Line," Hull Family Association, 1990
- Hughes, Phyllis J. "The Myth of Joanna Coffin, Given as First Wife of the Rev. Joseph Hull, 1635 Immigrant." Hull Family Association Journal, vol 12, no. 1 (spring 2001): p 23-24.
- Hull, James W. An Appeal to those Bearing the Name of Hull. The Hull Family Association, 1905.
- Hull, Robert B. "Joseph Hull." Proceedings of the Weymouth Historical Society, no 01, 1881.
- Hyde, Kenneth. "The Union Church at Launceston, Cornwall. Biblical Studies, 1952, p. 118-24.
- Jenness, John. The Isles of Shoals: An Historical Sketch. Houghton Mifflin, 1901, p. 144-46.
- King, H. Roger. Cape Cod and Plymouth Colony in the Seventeenth Century. University Press of America, 1994.
- Mather, Cotton. Magnalia Christi Americana, Book III. First American edition, 1702.
- McConnell, Samuel. History of the American Episcopal Church. T. Whittaker, 1897.
- Moody, Robert E. “Thomas Gorges, Proprietary Governor of Maine, 1640-1643.” Proceedings of the Massachusetts Historical Society, 3rd series, vol 75, 1963, p. 10-26.
- Moore, Susan Hardman. Pilgrims: New World Settlers and the Call of Home. Yale UP, 2007.
- Nash, Gilbert. Historical Sketch of the Town of Weymouth, Massachusetts, from 1622-1884. A. Mudge and Sons, 1885.
- Nash, Gilbert. The Original Journal of General Solomon Lovell, Kept During the Penobscot Expedition. Weymouth Historical Society, 1881.
- Otis, Amos. Genealogical Notes of Barnstable, 1888-90. Ed CF Swift. Genealogical Publishing, 1979.
- “Passengers for New England.” [Hull Company Passenger List] New England Historical and Genealogical Register, Volume 25, 1871, pp. 13-15. Republished online by Teaching American History.
- Peck, Francis. Desiderata Curiosa. Evans, 1779.
- Penney, Norman. "Record of the Sufferings of Quakers in Cornwall, 1655-1686." Friends Historical Society, 1928.
- Porter, Joseph B. "Rev Joseph Hull of York, ME." Bangor Historical Magazine, vol 6, numbers 7-9 (Jan-Mar 1891), page 125-128.
- Punchard, George. History of Congregationalism from about AD 250 to the Present Time. Congregational Publishing, 1880.
- Records of the Colony of New Plymouth. Court Orders, Vol 1, 1855.
- Robbins, Alfred F. "Query #99: Joseph Hull." The Western Antiquary, Or, Devon and Cornwall Note Book, vol 9-10, 1890.
- Robbins, Alfred F. Launceston, Past and Present: Historical and Descriptive Sketch. Weighell, 1888.
- Rutledge, Lyman V. The Isles of Shoals in Lore and Legend. Barre, 1965.
- Savage, James. A Genealogical Dictionary of the First settlers of New England Showing Three Generations of Those who Came before May, 1692, on the Basis of Farmer's Register. Little, Brown, 1860-62.
- “Scituate and Barnstable Church Records.” The New England Historical & Genealogical Register and Antiquarian Journal, vol. 10, 1856.
- Stackpole, Everett S., Lucien Thompson, and Winthrop Meserve. History of the Town of Durham, NH (Oyster River Plantation). Vol. 2, Durham, 1913.
- Swift, Charles Francis. Cape Cod, the Right Arm of Massachusetts: An Historical Narrative. Register, 1897.
- Thompson, Mary P. (1892). Landmarks in Ancient Dover. Concord Republican Press, 1892.
- Way, Timothy D. 2012 A New City upon a Hill: Puritans, Christian Reconstructionists, and Theocracy in America. M.Ed. thesis, Humboldt State University.
- Weygant, Charles. Hull Family in America. Sun Printing, 1913, p. 245-49.
- Weymouth Historical Society. “The Coming of the Hull Company.” History of Weymouth, Massachusetts, vol. 1. Wright and Potter, 1923, p. 72-75.
- Williams, Lois. Religion at the Isles of Shoals. Randall, 2006.
- Winthrop, John. Winthrop’s Journal, vol. 1. Ed. James Kendall Hosmer, Scribner’s, 1908, p. 163.
- Winthrop, John. Winthrop’s Journal, vol. 2. Ed. James Kendall Hosmer, Scribner's, 1908, p. 99, 218-19.
