= Barnstable, Massachusetts =

Barnstable
- Town
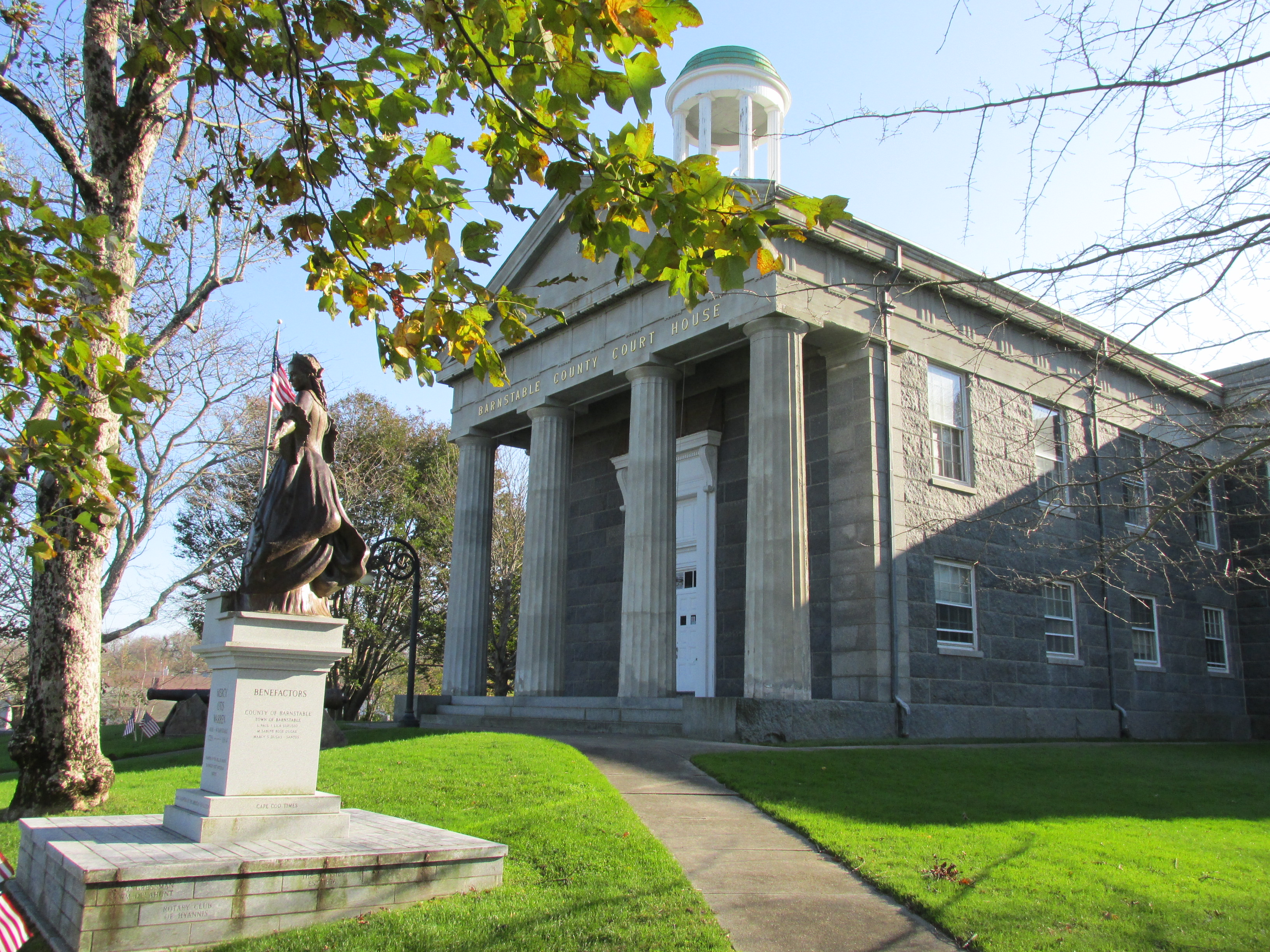
- Barnstable County Courthouse

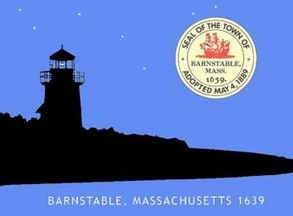
- Flag Seal

- Location in Barnstable County and the state of Massachusetts

- Location in Massachusetts Location in the United States
- Coordinates: 41°42′00″N 70°18′00″W
- Country: United States
- State: Massachusetts
- County: Barnstable County
- Settled: June 4, 1638
- Incorporated (town): September 3, 1639
- Incorporated (city): April 11, 1989
- Named for: Barnstaple, England

Government
  - Type: Council-manager city
  - Town Manager: Mark S. Ells
  - Town Council: Felicia R. Penn (President), Gordon Starr, Kristin E. Terkelsen, Betty Ludtke, Craig A. Tamash, John R. Crow, Paul C. Neary, Seth W. Burdick, Jeffrey Mendes, Charles R. Bloom, Matthew Levesque, Kris Clark, Paula K. Schnepp
  - Council administrator: Cindy Lovell

Area
  - Town: 76.47 sq mi (198.05 km^{2})
  - Land: 59.93 sq mi (155.22 km^{2})
  - Water: 16.54 sq mi (42.83 km^{2})
- Elevation: 36 ft (11 m)

Population (2020)
  - Town: 48,916
  - Density: 816.2/sq mi (315.15/km^{2})
  - Urban: 303,269 (US: 133rd)
  - Urban density: 889/sq mi (343.1/km^{2})
  - Metro: 228,996 (US: 201st)
- Time zone: UTC−5 (Eastern)
  - Summer (DST): UTC−4 (Eastern)
- ZIP Codes: 02601 (Hyannis); 02630 (Barnstable); 02632 (Centerville); 02635 (Cotuit); 02637 (Cummaquid); 02647 (Hyannis Port); 02648 (Marstons Mills); 02655 (Osterville); 02668 (West Barnstable); 02672 (West Hyannisport)
- Area code: 508 / 774
- FIPS code: 25-03690
- Website: barnstable.gov

Barnstable (/ˈbɑːrnstəbəl/ BARN-stə-bəl) is a town on Cape Cod in Massachusetts and the county seat of Barnstable County. Barnstable is the largest community, both in land area and population, on Cape Cod, and is one of thirteen Massachusetts municipalities that have been granted city forms of government by the Commonwealth of Massachusetts but wish to retain "the town of" in their official names. At the 2020 census it had a population of 48,916. The town contains several villages (one of which is also named Barnstable) within its boundaries. Its largest village, Hyannis, is the central business district of the Cape, and home to Barnstable Municipal Airport, the airline hub of Cape Cod and the islands of Martha's Vineyard and Nantucket. Additionally, Barnstable is a 2007 winner of the All-America City Award.

== History ==
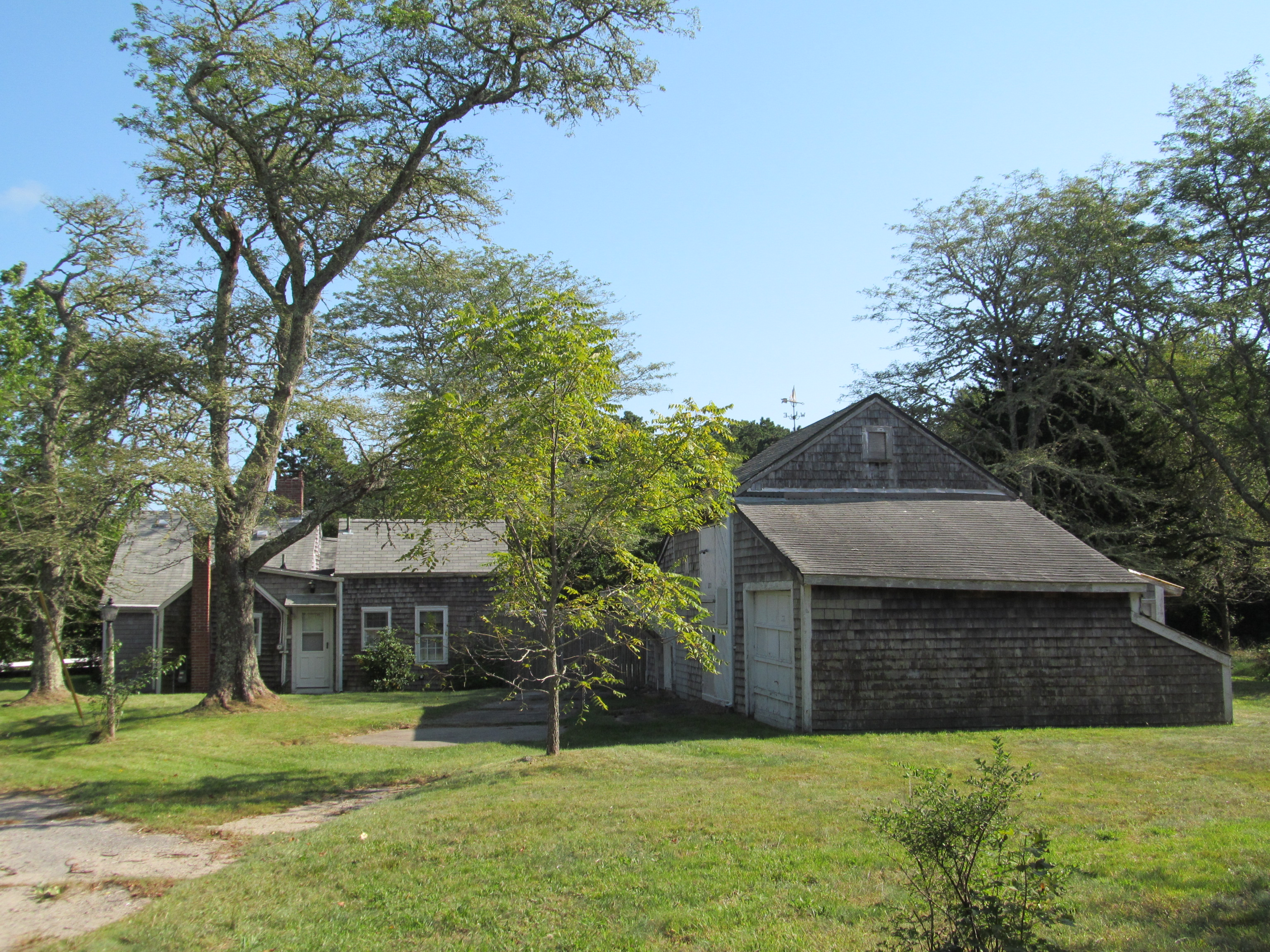
1653 Goodspeed House

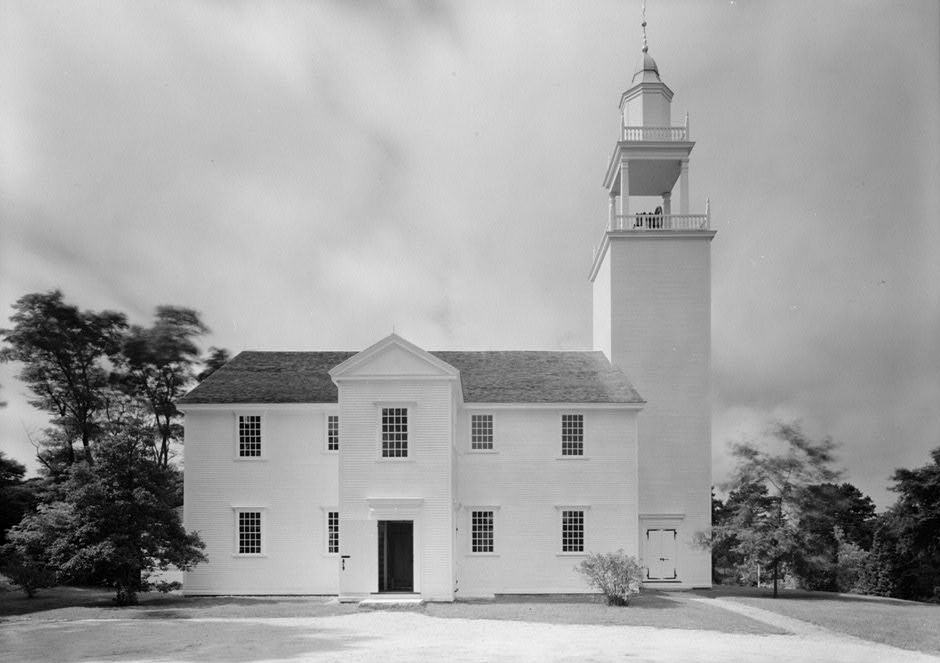
West Parish Congregational Church

Barnstable takes its name from the English town of Barnstaple, in the county of Devon. The first European to explore the area was Bartholomew Gosnold in 1602. It was settled in 1638, as one of the first towns in the Plymouth Colony, one year behind Sandwich further south in Massachusetts on Cape Cod. It was incorporated on September 4, 1639, the same day as the towns of Sandwich, and Yarmouth. On the first Tuesday of December, the same year, its deputies took their seats in the general court. The early settlers were farmers, led by the Reverend Joseph Hull, the founder of Barnstable. A memorial tablet was dedicated there in 1939 (the 300th anniversary of the town's founding) marking the site of his home, and the rock from which he preached still stands along the highway there.

Soon after the town's founding, agriculture, fishing and salt works became its major industries. By the end of the 19th century, there were some 804 ships harbored in the town. But the role of sailing ships declined with the rise of ocean-going steamships and the railroad, which had arrived in 1854.

By the late 19th century, Barnstable was becoming world-renowned as the tourist destination it still is to this day. Many prominent Bostonians spent their summers on the Cape shores, as did presidents Ulysses S. Grant and Grover Cleveland. The most well-known family of the 20th century to summer in the town was, and remains, the Kennedy family. They still inhabit the Kennedy Compound in Hyannis Port. This was the summer home of President John F. Kennedy during his administration, and it was likewise the home of Senator Ted Kennedy until his death.

Today, tourists come in droves to the town during the summer months. Hyannis has numerous shops. Other attractions include the John F. Kennedy Museum and several other museums. Significant sites and renowned historic houses listed on the National Register of Historic Places include the Ancient Burying Ground and Gideon Hawley House, representing the town's colonial history. The town's many beaches are popular tourist destinations as well.

== Geography ==
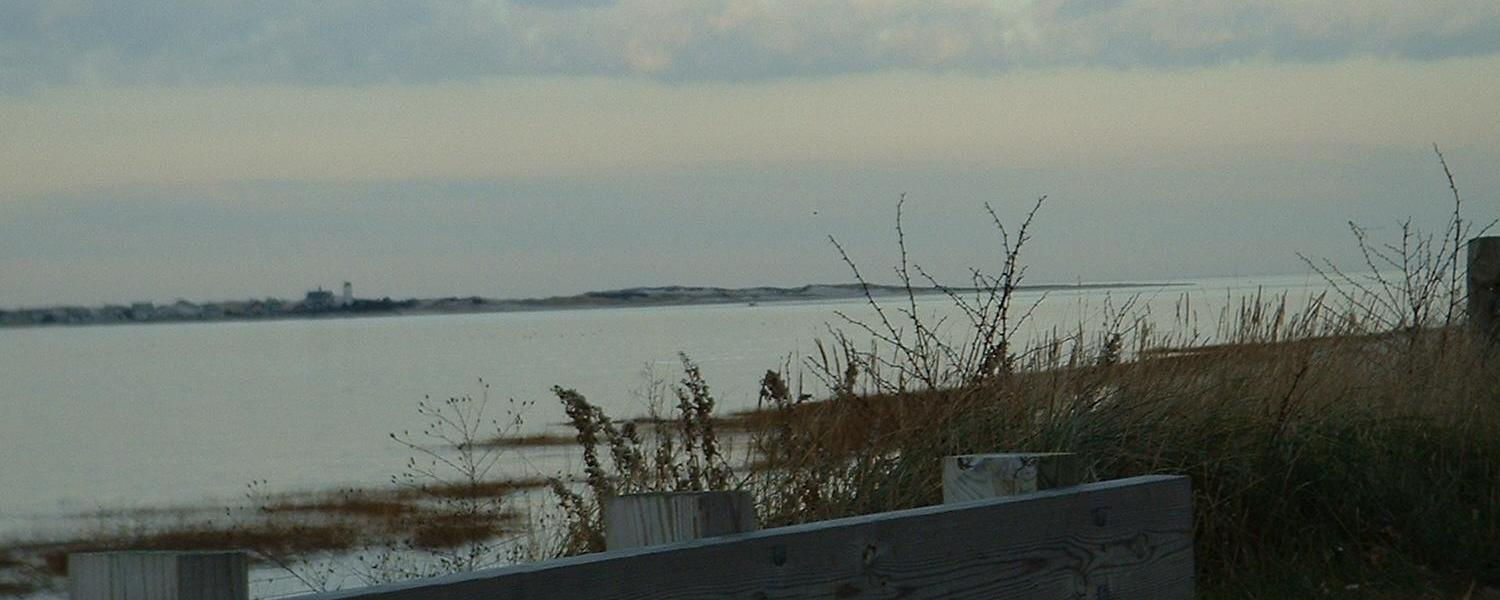
Barnstable Harbor, as seen from Millway Beach

Barnstable is located at 41°39′33″N 70°21′11″W (41.659158, –70.353059), about halfway along the "biceps" of the Cape Cod "arm". According to the United States Census Bureau, the town has a total area of 76.3 square miles (197.7 km^{2}), of which 59.8 square miles (154.9 km^{2}) is land and 16.5 square miles (42.8 km^{2}), or 21.66%, is water. It is bordered by Cape Cod Bay on the north, Nantucket Sound on the south, Sandwich and Mashpee on the west and Yarmouth on the east. Barnstable is approximately 70 miles (110 km) southeast of Boston.

=== Villages ===
The Town of Barnstable contains several villages, which are not legally defined entities. Between seven and eleven are commonly enumerated, listed below with ZIP codes:

- The village of Barnstable (02630), including Cummaquid (02637)
- Centerville (02632)
- Cotuit (02635)
- Hyannis (02601), including Hyannis Port (02647) and West Hyannisport (02672)
- Marstons Mills (02648)
- Osterville (02655)
- West Barnstable (02668)

To the north of Barnstable lie the dunes of Sandy Neck along Barnstable Harbor, tipped by the Sandy Neck Light. The central part of the town is dominated by the pines and oaks around Wequaquet Lake. The south is where the bulk of the population lives, many along the beaches of Centerville and Hyannis Harbors. Hyannis is the biggest village in Barnstable by size and population.

=== Climate ===
According to the Köppen climate classification system, Barnstable has a humid continental climate (Dfb). Dfb climates are characterized by at least one month having an average mean temperature ≤ 32.0 °F (≤ 0.0 °C), at least four months with an average mean temperature ≥ 50.0 °F (≥ 10.0 °C), all months with an average mean temperature ≤ 71.6 °F (≤ 22.0 °C), and no significant precipitation difference between seasons. The average seasonal (Nov-Apr) snowfall total is approximately 30 inches (76 cm). The average snowiest month is February, which corresponds with the annual peak in nor'easter activity. According to the United States Department of Agriculture, the plant hardiness zone is 7a, with an average annual extreme minimum air temperature of 0.3 °F (−17.6 °C).

Climate data for Barnstable, Barnstable County, Massachusetts (1981–2010 averages)
Month	Jan	Feb	Mar	Apr	May	Jun	Jul	Aug	Sep	Oct	Nov	Dec	Year
Mean daily maximum °F (°C)	37.8 (3.2)	39.4 (4.1)	44.7 (7.1)	53.2 (11.8)	62.8 (17.1)	72.2 (22.3)	78.2 (25.7)	77.4 (25.2)	71.1 (21.7)	61.3 (16.3)	52.9 (11.6)	43.3 (6.3)	57.9 (14.4)
Daily mean °F (°C)	30.2 (−1.0)	31.8 (−0.1)	37.3 (2.9)	45.6 (7.6)	55.0 (12.8)	64.7 (18.2)	70.8 (21.6)	70.2 (21.2)	63.4 (17.4)	53.5 (11.9)	45.3 (7.4)	35.8 (2.1)	50.4 (10.2)
Mean daily minimum °F (°C)	22.6 (−5.2)	24.2 (−4.3)	29.8 (−1.2)	38.1 (3.4)	47.2 (8.4)	57.2 (14.0)	63.5 (17.5)	63.0 (17.2)	55.8 (13.2)	45.7 (7.6)	37.7 (3.2)	28.4 (−2.0)	42.9 (6.1)
Average precipitation inches (mm)	3.72 (94)	3.26 (83)	4.60 (117)	4.24 (108)	3.31 (84)	3.53 (90)	3.19 (81)	3.49 (89)	3.67 (93)	4.01 (102)	4.11 (104)	4.21 (107)	45.34 (1,152)
Average relative humidity (%)	69.1	68.2	66.9	69.2	72.2	74.7	76.9	77.1	77.1	73.7	70.6	70.1	72.2
Average dew point °F (°C)	21.3 (−5.9)	22.5 (−5.3)	27.3 (−2.6)	36.1 (2.3)	46.2 (7.9)	56.5 (13.6)	63.2 (17.3)	62.7 (17.1)	56.1 (13.4)	45.3 (7.4)	36.3 (2.4)	27.0 (−2.8)	41.8 (5.4)
Source: PRISM Climate Group

== Ecology ==
According to the A. W. Kuchler U.S. Potential natural vegetation Types, Barnstable, Massachusetts would primarily contain a Northeastern Oak/Pine (110) vegetation type with a Southern Mixed Forest (26) vegetation form.

== Demographics ==
Historical population
Year	Pop.	±%
1790	2,610	—
1840	4,301	+64.8%
1850	4,901	+14.0%
1860	5,129	+4.7%
1870	4,793	−6.6%
1880	4,242	−11.5%
1890	4,023	−5.2%
1900	4,364	+8.5%
1910	4,676	+7.1%
1920	4,836	+3.4%
1930	7,271	+50.4%
1940	8,333	+14.6%
1950	10,480	+25.8%
1960	13,465	+28.5%
1970	19,842	+47.4%
1980	30,898	+55.7%
1990	40,949	+32.5%
2000	47,821	+16.8%
2010	45,193	−5.5%
2020	48,916	+8.2%
2024*	49,831	+1.9%
source: = population estimate. Source: United States census records and Population Estimates Program data. Source: U.S. Decennial Census

As of the census of 2000, there were 47,821 people, 19,626 households, and 13,012 families residing in the town. The population density was 796.5 inhabitants per square mile (307.5/km^{2}). There were 25,018 housing units at an average density of 416.7 per square mile (160.9/km^{2}). The racial makeup of the town was 91.85% White, 2.74% Black or African American, 0.59% Native American, 0.81% Asian, 0.04% Pacific Islander, 1.67% from other races, and 2.30% from two or more races. Hispanic or Latino of any race were 1.70% of the population. 24.2% were of Irish, 13.3% English, 9.3% Italian and 5.5% American ancestry according to Census 2000. 92.1% spoke English, 3.4% Portuguese, 1.6% Spanish and 1.0% French as their first language.

There were 19,626 households, out of which 26.9% had children under the age of 18 living with them, 52.4% were married couples living together, 10.7% had a female householder with no husband present, and 33.7% were non-families. 27.7% of all households were made up of individuals, and 12.5% had someone living alone who was 65 years of age or older. The average household size was 2.38 and the average family size was 2.88.

In the town the population was spread out, with 22.0% under the age of 18, 5.6% from 18 to 24, 26.8% from 25 to 44, 25.5% from 45 to 64, and 20.1% who were 65 years of age or older. The median age was 42 years. For every 100 females, there were 91.6 males. For every 100 females age 18 and over, there were 87.9 males.

The median income for a household in the town was $46,811, and the median income for a family was $54,026. Males had a median income of $41,494 versus $30,442 for females. The per capita income for the town was $25,554. About 6.3% of families and 8.8% of the population were below the poverty line, including 11.7% of those under age 18 and 5.9% of those age 65 or over.

== Government ==
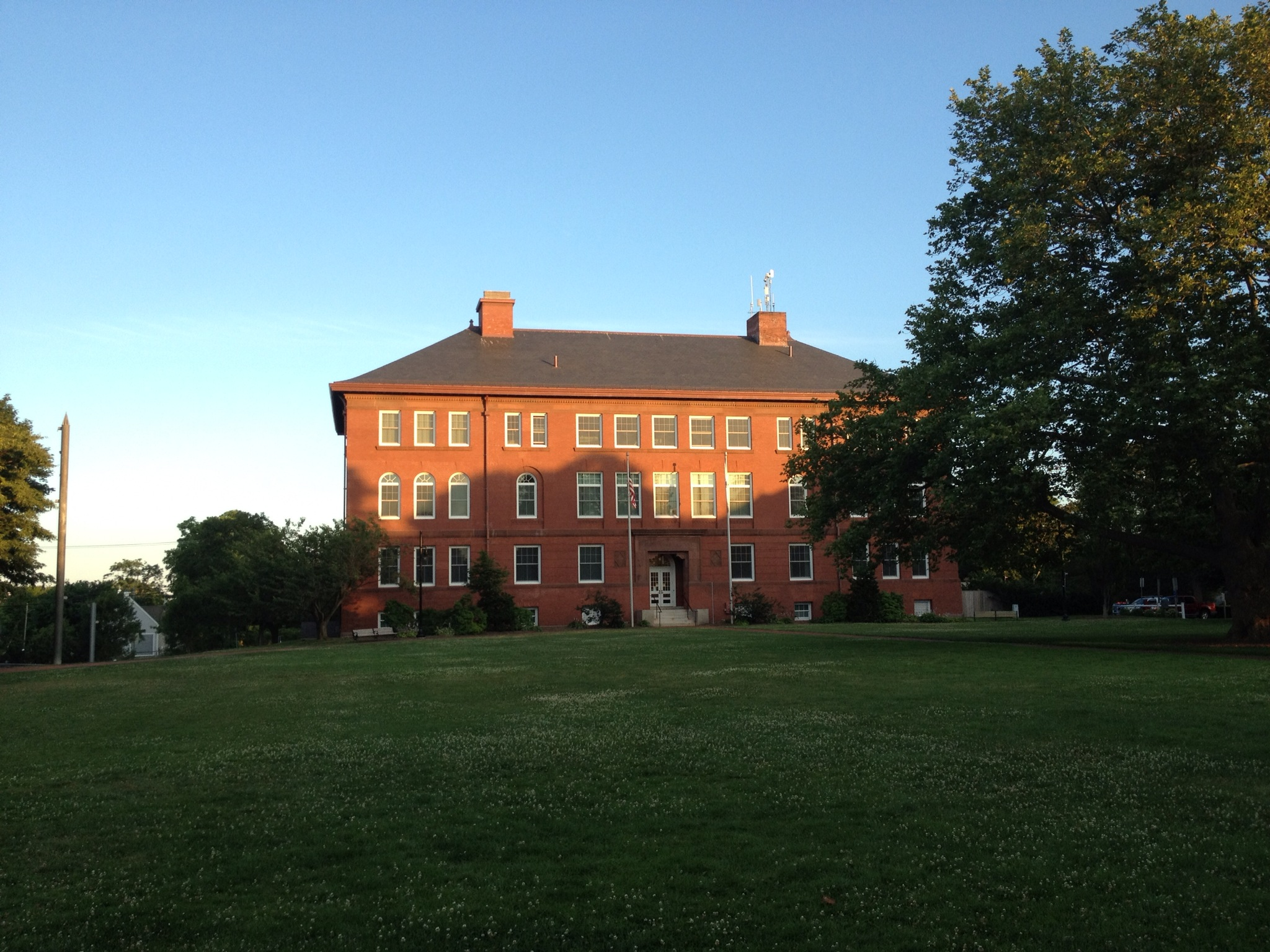
Barnstable Town Hall

Barnstable has a council–manager government. It was created in 1989, when the Town rewrote its charter and changed from a selectmen-town meeting form of government to adopt a council-manager system. The council hires the town manager. Barnstable is one of thirteen Massachusetts municipalities that have applied for, and been granted, city forms of government but wish to retain "the town of" in their official names.

The first town manager, Warren Rutherford, held office from 1990 to 1997. His successor, James Tinsley, served from 1997 to 1999. He was succeeded by former state representative John C. Klimm. Klimm had his contract bought out in 2011 due to internal disputes among a majority of the Barnstable City Council. He was succeeded by the executive director of the Barnstable Housing Authority, Thomas K. Lynch. Mark Ells has served as the Town Manager since 2016.

The town hall is located in the village of Hyannis, and the police station is located on Route 132, closer to the geographic center of the town. There are eight fire stations, seven libraries, and ten post offices located throughout the town. The largest, or central branches, are usually located in the downtown Hyannis area. Hyannis also is the site of the Cape Cod Hospital, which serves the central Cape region. As the county seat of Barnstable County, the town is the site of the county courthouse and juvenile lockup at the old House of Corrections, as well as the Offices of the Cape and Islands District Attorney.

Presidential election results

Barnstable Township vote by party in presidential elections
Year	Republican	Democratic
2024	42.9% 15,227	54.9% 11,919
2020	40.2% 11,436	58.0% 16,491
2016	43.0% 11,195	50.0% 13,005
2012	48.2% 12,354	50.6% 12,946
2008	44.3% 11,084	54.2% 13,559
2004	46.9% 11,938	52.0% 13,236
2000	42.6% 10,237	50.3% 12,080
1996	37.4% 8,317	51.9% 11,543
1992	30.4% 6,558	41.6% 8,972
1988	49.5% 10,026	49.2% 9,971
1984	56.6% 10,333	43.0% 7,856
1980	50.8% 8,335	28.1% 4,613
1976	54.3% 7,853	42.8% 6,196
1972	61.1% 7,237	38.2% 4,521
1968	57.8% 5,194	39.2% 3,523
1964	44.4% 3,450	55.3% 4,296
1960	61.8% 4,515	38.1% 2,783
1956	84.9% 5,337	14.8% 933
1952	83.2% 4,941	16.6% 987
1948	75.4% 3,232	23.4% 1,003
1944	71.4% 2,596	28.2% 1,026
1940	71.3% 2,870	27.8% 1,141
1936	69.7% 2,564	28.6% 1,052
1932	70.1% 2,031	27.9% 808
1928	76.7% 1,931	22.6% 570
1924	83.5% 1,318	11.2% 177
1920	77.8% 1,114	21.4% 306
1916	53.6% 515	44.1% 424
1912	21.9% 219	29.5% 295
1908	70.4% 657	23.5% 219
1904	73.8% 650	24.1% 212
1900	74.8% 606	23.9% 194
1896	81.9% 719	14.1% 124
1892	66.6% 530	31.7% 252
1888	67.6% 438	31.5% 204
1884	59.2% 399	34.0% 229
1880	68.2% 483	31.8% 225
1876	64.7% 359	35.3% 196
1872	84.5% 343	15.5% 63
1868	71.1% 432	28.9% 176

Barnstable is represented in the Massachusetts House of Representatives as a part of the Second, Third and Fifth Barnstable districts. The town is represented in the Massachusetts Senate as a part of the Cape and Islands district, which encompasses most of Cape Cod, Martha's Vineyard and Nantucket. The town is patrolled by the Second (Yarmouth) Barracks of Troop D of the Massachusetts State Police.

On the national level, Barnstable is a part of Massachusetts's 9th congressional district, and is currently represented by William R. Keating. The state's senior (Class II) member of the United States Senate, is Elizabeth Warren. The junior senator from Massachusetts is Ed Markey, elected in 2013.

Voter Registration and Party Enrollment as of October 15, 2008
Party	Number of Voters	Percentage
Democratic	8,242	25.45%
Republican	5,836	18.02%
Unaffiliated	18,073	55.80%
Libertarian	235	0.73%
Total	32,386	100%

== Education ==
Barnstable has the largest public school enrollment of any town on Cape Cod, with over 5,000 students. In 2010, the public school system underwent major changes due to budgetary constraints. The presently operational schools include: the Enoch Cobb Early Learning Center for preschool students and five elementary schools serving various grades, including: Centerville Elementary School (K–3), Barnstable Community Horace Mann Public Charter School (formerly Hyannis East Elementary School) (K–3), West Villages Elementary School (formerly Marstons Mills East Elementary School) (K–3), Hyannis West Elementary School (K–3), and Barnstable-West Barnstable Elementary School (K–3). The Barnstable United Elementary School (formerly Barnstable Horace Mann Charter School) serves the Town's fourth and fifth grade students. The Barnstable Intermediate School (formerly Barnstable Middle School) serves grades six and seven. Barnstable High School serves grades eight through twelve. Barnstable's athletic teams are nicknamed the Red Hawks, and their colors are red and white. Their teams are highly successful because of the large student body from which to choose players. Notable town rivals of the Red Hawks are Dennis/Yarmouth and Falmouth. Barnstable has played Falmouth in football on Thanksgiving Day nearly every year since 1895, making the annual game one of the longest-standing high school football rivalries in history.

In addition to its public schools, there are also several private schools in Barnstable. There are five Christian schools, three of which are not Catholic: Bayberry Christian Academy (K–3), Faith Christian School (Pre-K–12), and Trinity Christian Academy (Pre-K–12). There are two Catholic schools, Saint Francis Xavier Prep (5–8) and Pope John Paul II High School, which opened in 2007. Barnstable is also home to the Academy of Early Learning (Pre-K–6), Veritas Academy (K–8), and the Cape Cod Academy, a private K–12 school. There are also two special education schools (Southeast Alternative & Beacon Point), as well as the Sturgis Charter School, which serves high school-aged students. Additionally, high school students have the option of attending Cape Cod Regional Technical High School in Harwich free of charge.

Barnstable is the home of Cape Cod Community College, a two-year junior college affiliated with Suffolk University in Boston.

== Transportation ==
Both U.S. Route 6 and Massachusetts Route 28 pass through the town from west to east, with Route 6 being a four-lane freeway through the town. Routes 6A, 132, 149 and a brief 0.1-mile (0.16 km) portion of 130 are also located in town. Route 6A follows an east–west route to the north of Route 6, on its route between the Sagamore Bridge and the Orleans Rotary. Routes 132 and 149 are both entirely located within the town, and both begin at 6A and end at Route 28.

Since 2013, the CapeFlyer passenger rail service has run on weekends between Memorial Day and Labor Day. The nearest MBTA Commuter Rail stations with year-round service are Middleborough and Kingston. The nearest inter-city (Amtrak) passenger rail stations are Boston's South Station and Providence. Freight rail service is provided by the Massachusetts Coastal Railroad.

The Cape Cod Central Railroad operates seasonal tourist excursions from Hyannis to Sandwich and Sagamore, with some scheduled weekend stops at the West Barnstable depot on Route 149 near Route 6A.

The town is the site of two airports. Cape Cod Airfield is a smaller airfield, used primarily for private travel, and Barnstable Municipal Airport at Polando Field is used for regional flights, especially between the Cape and the islands. Regional airline Cape Air is headquartered in Barnstable. The nearest national and international air service can be reached at Logan International Airport in Boston. Hyannis is also the site of the main ferry lines to Nantucket and Martha's Vineyard.

== Notable people ==
- Demetrius Atsalis, state representative
- Orrin Bacon, Wisconsin state legislator
- Austin Bearse, abolitionist, merchant mariner
- Gary Brito, LTG U.S. Army
- Joe Cronin, professional baseball player, manager, and Hall of Famer
- Gary DiSarcina, MLB player and coach
- Isaac Dunbar, singer-songwriter
- Nancy Frangione, actor
- Raymond Goulding, comedian, actor, writer
- Andy Hallett, actor and singer
- Tom Hamilton, bassist for the rock band Aerosmith
- John Havlicek, basketball player for the Boston Celtics
- Thomas Hinckley, governor of Plymouth Colony
- Rev. Joseph Hull, minister who moved to Massachusetts and founded the Hull Colony
- Amy Jo Johnson, original Pink Power Ranger
- Herbert Kalmus, co-founder and president of the Technicolor Corporation
- Edward M. Kennedy, U.S. senator from Massachusetts, 1962–2009
- John F. Kennedy, 35th President of the United States
- Joseph P. Kennedy Sr., 44th United States Ambassador to the United Kingdom, 1938–1940
- Joseph P. Kennedy II, served in the U.S. House of Representatives from Massachusetts
- Patrick J. Kennedy, Rhode Island congressman and youngest child of Ted Kennedy
- Robert F. Kennedy, United States Attorney General, 1961–1964, and U.S. senator from New York, 1965–1968
- Rose Fitzgerald Kennedy, matriarch of the Kennedy family
- Jack Kerouac, novelist, poet, artist
- Paul G. Kirk, U.S. senator from Massachusetts, 2009–2010
- Dan LaCouture, NHL hockey wingman
- Reverend John Lothropp, founder of Town of Barnstable
- Siobhan Magnus, former American Idol contestant
- Neal McDonough, film and television actor
- Eric Nickulas, NHL hockey player for the Boston Bruins
- John T. Olson, brigadier general in the United States Air Force
- James Otis, lawyer and American patriot
- Paul Pena, blues singer, guitarist
- John Percival, captain of the USS Constitution
- Jane Maria Read (born 1853), poet, artist, teacher
- Robert Richardson, Academy Award-winning cinematographer
- Eliza Scudder, hymnwriter
- Marnie Schulenburg, actor
- Lemuel Shaw, state representative, state senator, 1821–1822; Massachusetts Chief Justice, 1830–1860
- Casey Sherman, bestselling author of A Rose for Mary, Black Irish & The Finest Hours
- Eunice Kennedy Shriver, founder of the Special Olympics
- Robert Sargent Shriver Jr., 21st United States Ambassador to France, founder of the Peace Corps
- William F. Sturgis, a Boston merchant and politician in 1800s
- Paul Stewart, professional ice hockey player and NHL referee
- Michael Tonello, bestselling author
- Kathleen Kennedy Townsend, lieutenant governor of Maryland, 1995–2003
- Kurt Vonnegut, author, political icon, entertainer
- Mercy Otis Warren, author, poet, playwright, and American patriot
- Eden White, singer
- Max Willman, hockey player for the Philadelphia Flyers

== See also ==
- Barnstaple, England (often called the town's twin)
- National Register of Historic Places listings in Barnstable County, Massachusetts
