= Wequaquet Lake =

- Location of Wequaquet Lake within Massachusetts Wequaquet Lake (the United States)
- Location: Barnstable County, Massachusetts
- Coordinates: 41°40′17″N 70°20′20″W
- Type: lake
- Primary outflows: Centerville River
- Basin countries: United States
- Surface area: 654 acres (265 ha)
- Average depth: 14 feet (4.3 m)
- Max. depth: 33 feet (10 m)
- Shore length^{1}: 7.5 miles (12.1 km)
- Surface elevation: 33 feet (10 m)
- Settlements: Hyannis
- ^{1} Shore length is not a well-defined measure.

Wequaquet Lake is a 654 acres (265 ha) unstratified warmwater lake in Barnstable County, Massachusetts. It is located northwest of Hyannis. Wequaquet Lake drains south via Centerville River which flows into the Atlantic Ocean. Wequaquet Lake is also known as Chequaquet Lake, Great Pond or Nine Mile Pond. The bottom is composed primarily of sand. The 7.5 miles (12.1 km) of shoreline is heavily (90%) developed with cottages and year-round homes. Bearse Pond is connected to Wequaquet Lake by a narrow channel, other nearby ponds include Hathaways Pond and Shallow Pond.

== Fishing ==
Fish species present in the lake are pumpkinseed, yellow perch, golden shiner, brown bullhead, American eel, alewife, white sucker, banded killifish, chain pickerel and largemouth bass. The alewife and blueback herring populations are sea-run, entering via the Centerville River.

== Locations ==
- Fuller Point
- Lewis Point
- Hayes Point
- Great Point
- Little Point
- Long Point
- Gooseberry Island
- Huckins Neck
- Nyes Point
- Nyes Neck
- Stoney Point
- Point Shirley
