= Michael Tonello =

American author

Michael Tonello (born July 19) is an author best known for being an expert on Birkin bags, a luxury brand of tote bag.

Tonello was a reseller of luxury goods, finding his niche buying Hermès items at retail and reselling them on eBay.

In 2008, William Morrow/HarperCollins published his memoir called Bringing Home the Birkin; My Life in Hot Pursuit of the World’s Most Coveted Handbag. The book details his adventures as an eBay entrepreneur who travels all over the world, going to Hermès stores to procure "same day" Birkins for wealthy and famous clients who do not want to wait for the item. In 2016, Tonello co-founded the luxury brand Respoke.
