= Barnstable Public School District =

School district in Massachusetts, United States

Location
- Barnstable, Massachusetts

District information
- Type: Public; Open enrollment
- Grades: K-12
- Superintendent: Dr. Sara Ahern
- Asst. superintendent(s): Kristen Harmon
- Budget: $87,228,024 total $15,555 per pupil (2016)

Students and staff
- District mascot: REDHAWKS
- Colors: Red, white

Other information
- Website: www.barnstable.k12.ma.us

The Barnstable Public School District oversees the operation all public schools in Barnstable, Massachusetts, United States. The Superintendent of Schools is Sara Ahern. The Assistant Superintendent is Kristen Harmon.

== History ==
Although it is unknown when the school district started, it is generally believed to have been in existence by the early 1900s.

=== 2001 and 2003 Overrides Fail ===
In 2001, a Proposition 2 1/2 override failed to pass. In addition to teacher cuts across the system and reductions in each school's budget, the most significant losses were to the schools' award-winning music program; elementary school feeder programs were cut completely. In 2002 the district faced another budget shortfall and the school committee voted to implement fees for bus transportation, music programs and sports programs. A 2003 override was attempted to remove these fees and prevent further staff lay-offs. The override failed and the fees remained. The loss of feeder music programs in 2001 and the subsequent fees for participation in the high school music program decimated the award-winning Barnstable High School Marching Band.

== Schools ==
- Barnstable High School (Grades 8-12)
- Barnstable Intermediate School (Grades 6-7)
- Barnstable United Elementary School (Grades 4-5)
- Barnstable Community Innovation School (Grades K-3)
- Barnstable/West Barnstable Elementary School (Grades K-3)
- Centerville Elementary School (Grades K-3)
- Hyannis West Elementary School (Grades K-3)
- West Villages Elementary School (Grades K-3)
- The Enoch Cobb Early Learning Center (Preschool)
