= Barnstable Harbor =

Coordinates: 41.707°N 70.300°W

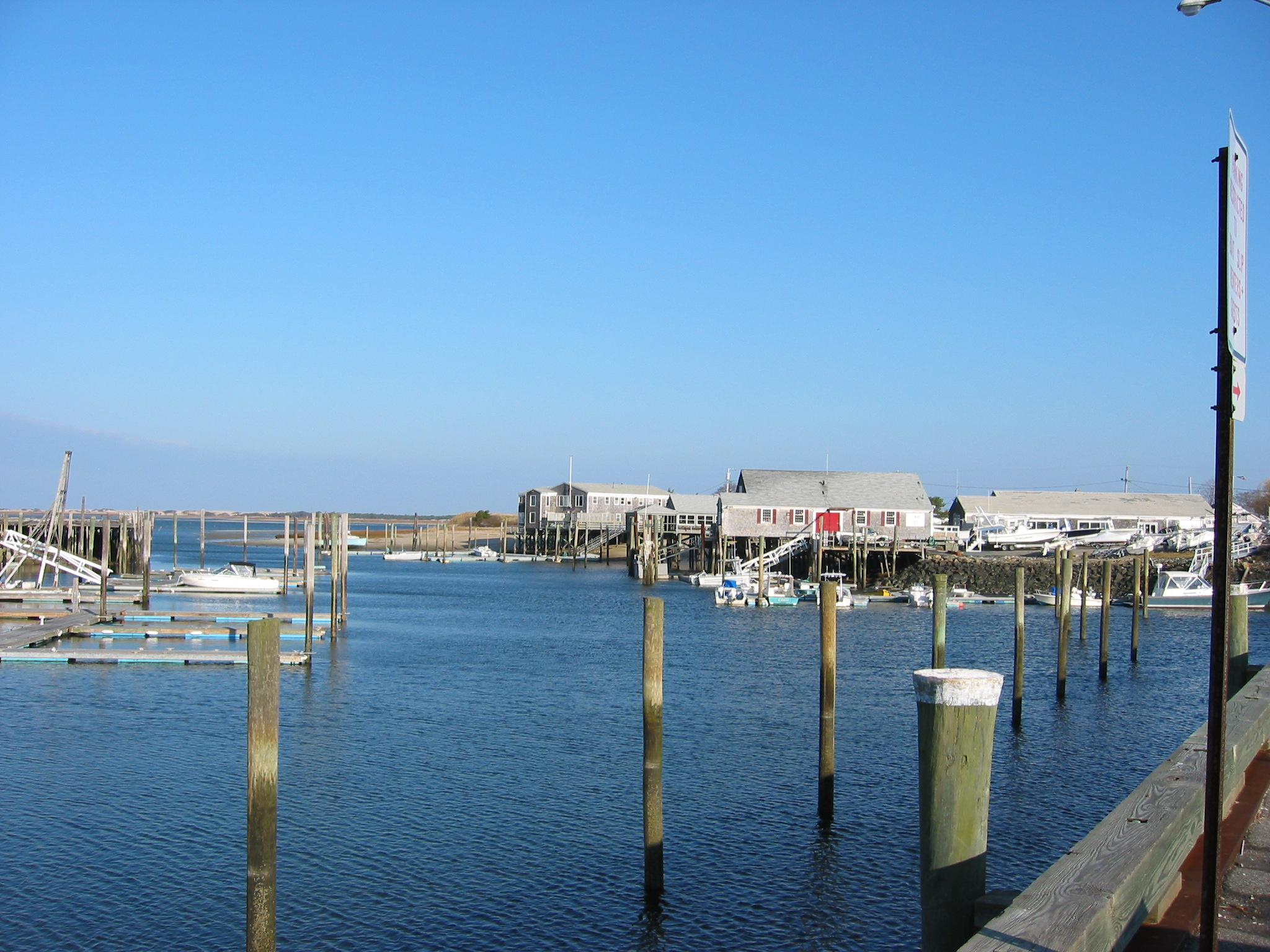
Barnstable Harbor, in 2002

Barnstable Harbor is a natural harbor located in Barnstable, Massachusetts that is sheltered by Sandy Neck to the north and the city of Barnstable to the south. The inner harbor is mostly dredged, while the outer harbor is natural.

During the 2014-2015 winter, the inner harbor suffered extensive ice damage to pilings, which were pulled out or snapped.
