= Liberty Hall (disambiguation) =

Liberty Hall in Dublin, Ireland is the headquarters of the Services, Industrial, Professional, and Technical Union.

Liberty Hall may also refer to:

== Buildings ==
=== Australia ===
- Liberty Hall, Ipswich

=== United States ===
- Liberty Hall (Camden, Alabama); NRHP-listed
- Liberty Hall (Oakland, California); NRHP-listed
- Liberty Hall (Americus, Georgia); NRHP-listed
- Liberty Hall (Crawfordville, Georgia); NRHP-listed
- Liberty Hall (Lamoni, Iowa); NRHP-listed
- Liberty Hall (Frankfort, Kentucky); NRHP-listed
- Liberty Hall (Machiasport, Maine); NRHP-listed
- Liberty Hall (Westover, Maryland); NRHP-listed
- Liberty Hall (Barnstable, Massachusetts)
- Liberty Hall (New Jersey)
- Liberty Hall (Kenansville, North Carolina)
- Liberty Hall (Windsor, North Carolina)
- Liberty Hall (Quakertown, Pennsylvania)
- Liberty Hall (Houston, Texas)
- Liberty Hall (Tyler, Texas)
- Liberty Hall (Forest, Virginia); NRHP-listed
- Liberty Hall Academy, now Washington and Lee University
  - Liberty Hall Site
- Liberty Hall, the land surrounding the Liberty Tree in Boston, Massachusetts

== Arts and entertainment ==
- Liberty Hall, a fictional location in Oliver Goldsmith's 1773 play She Stoops to Conquer
- Liberty Hall (play), by R. C. Carton, 1892
- Liberty Hall (film), a 1914 silent film adaptation of Carton's play
- Liberty Hall, a 1985 album by Oysterband

== Other uses ==
- Liberty Hall Formation is a geologic formation in Virginia, U.S.

== See also ==
- Independence Hall (disambiguation)
