= Marstons Mills Hearse House and Cemetery =

Historic cemetery in Barnstable County, Massachusetts

- U.S. National Register of Historic Places
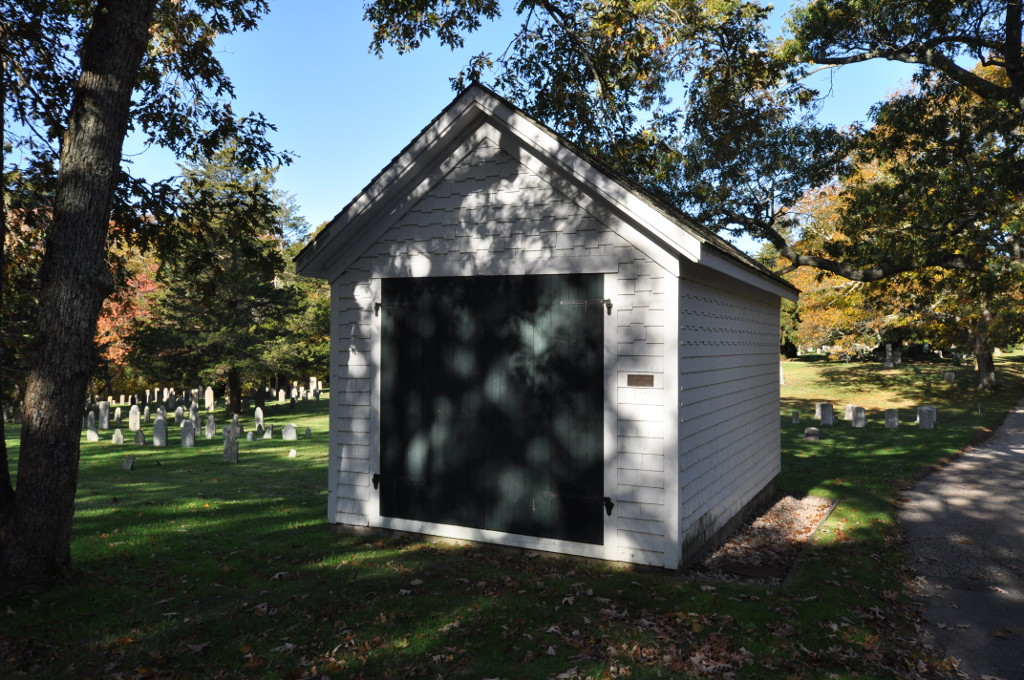

- Location within Cape Cod Location within Massachusetts Location within the United States
- Location: MA 149, Barnstable, Massachusetts
- Coordinates: 41°39′43″N 70°24′31″W
- Built: 1780
- MPS: Barnstable MRA
- NRHP reference No.: 87000302
- Added to NRHP: March 13, 1987

The Marstons Mills Hearse House and Cemetery is a historic cemetery on Massachusetts Route 149 in the Marstons Mills section of Barnstable, Massachusetts. The hearse house, essentially a garage, was built c. 1885 to house a hearse for the village of Marstons Mills, and was one of seven such buildings erected in Barnstable. It is one of only two that are now left, and the only one that is relatively unaltered and in its original setting. It presently serves as a utility shed for the Marston Mills Cemetery, and is maintained by the local historic society. It is a simple rectangular wood-frame structure, with a gable roof, decorative shingle exterior, and a large double-leaf equipment door.

The Marston Mills Cemetery was established in 1775, and is the resting place of many of the village's early settlers. It is located on the northwest side of Route 149, between Mistic Drive and Cammett Road. It is still in active use; the oldest graves are nearest the street, and it has an estimated 300–400 burials.

The property was listed on the National Register of Historic Places in 1987.

== See also ==
- National Register of Historic Places listings in Barnstable County, Massachusetts
