= Liberty Hall (Barnstable, Massachusetts) =

- U.S. National Register of Historic Places
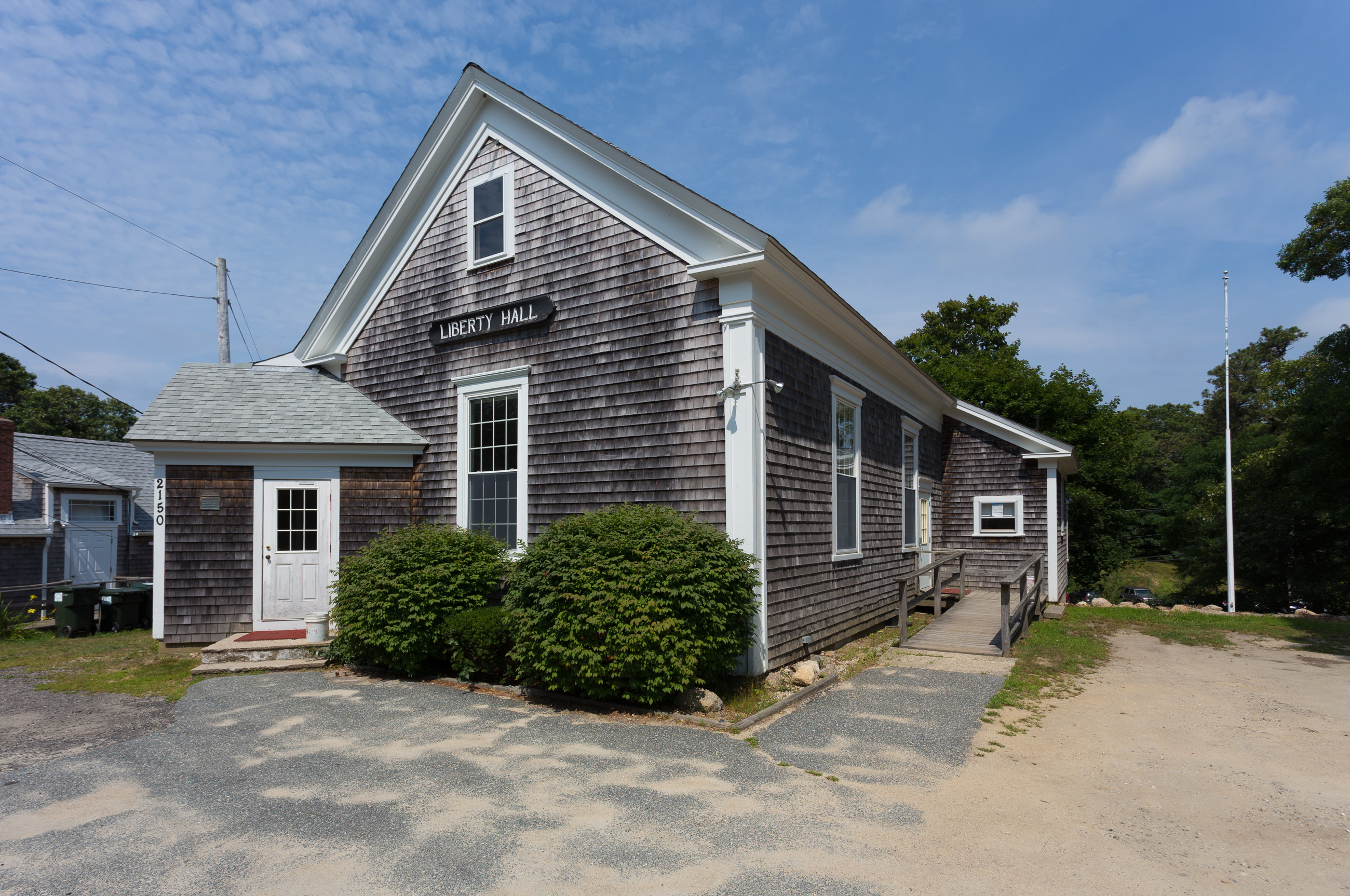
- Liberty Hall in 2014

- Location within Cape Cod Location within Massachusetts Location within the United States
- Location: 2150 Main St., Barnstable, Massachusetts
- Coordinates: 41°39′15″N 70°24′46″W
- Built: 1859
- Architectural style: Greek Revival
- MPS: Barnstable MRA
- NRHP reference No.: 87000246
- Added to NRHP: March 13, 1987

Liberty Hall is a historic community building in the Marstons Mills village of Barnstable, Massachusetts. The 1 1/2-story structure was built in 1859 by a local community group as a function hall. It has modest Greek Revival styling, with an entablature and corner pilasters, large 12-over-12 sash windows, and an entry vestibule projecting at an angle from one corner. It continues to be used as a community function space, although it was adapted for a time as the local Methodist church's parish hall.

The building was listed on the National Register of Historic Places in 1987.

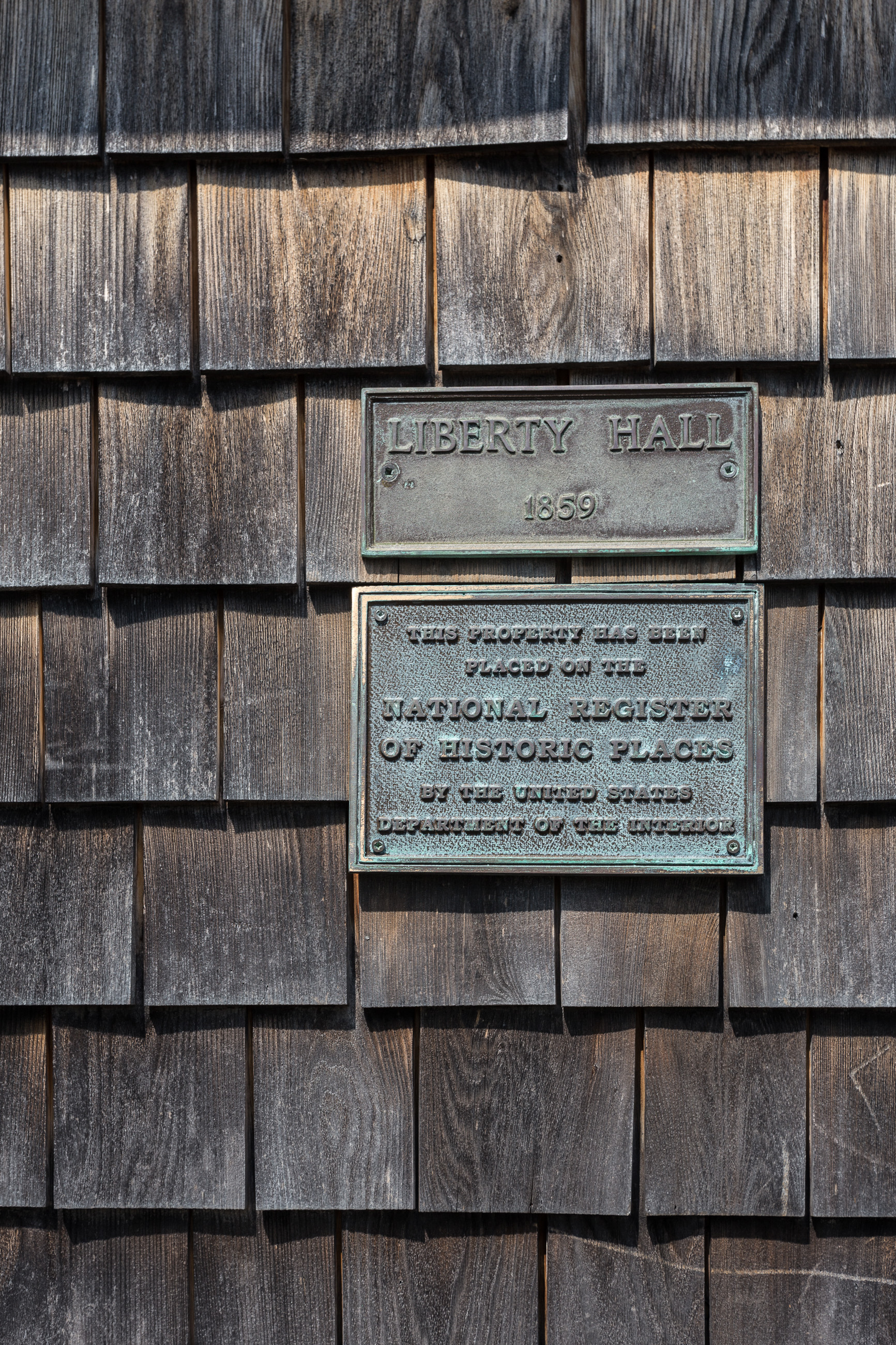
Plaque on the building

== See also ==
- National Register of Historic Places listings in Barnstable County, Massachusetts
