= Camp Perkins =

Massachusetts Army National Guard camp

Coordinates: 41°41′07.0″N 70°24′08.1″W

Camp Perkins was a Massachusetts Army National Guard camp located in Barnstable, Massachusetts near the site of the present Cape Cod Airfield.

== History ==
On June 8, 1921, Brig. Gen. John H. Sherburne announced that the 51st Field Artillery Brigade of the Massachusetts National Guard would hold their summer encampment in West Barnstable, Massachusetts. The camp bordered on Mystic Lake, between West Barnstable, Massachusetts and Cotuit near the village Marstons Mills on a plateau ninety feet above the Lake. The camp was named Camp Perkins in honor of the deceased Col. Frank S. Perkins of the Yankee Division. Construction was delayed due to issues with the Federal appropriation for the camp. When the first guardsmen arrived on July 9, 1921, the camp was still largely incomplete.

The camp was described in The Barnstable Patriot in 1921 as having water piped in to company streets, electric lights, a telephone system, a wireless system, and equipment to listen into messages from the Eiffel Tower and Tufts College band concerts. The listening equipment could also pick up storm warnings along the coast of the Atlantic Ocean. It was also described as having 400 horses, which watered in the nearby lake, something which was a daily source of enjoyment for the infantry men. The camp also fired at a range on the nearby Sandy Neck, a barrier beach on the north side of Barnstable. The guns themselves were described as being just north of the New Haven Railroad. Full charges were also used, with both shrapnel and high explosives. The men also visited the nearby village of Osterville in their free time. As many as 600 men and 400 horses would visit the camp each summer. According to the Boston Globe, the 101st Field Artillery Regiment and 102nd Field Artillery Regiment trained at the Camp in 1922. On September 10, 1922, the Cape Cod Chamber of Commerce sent a letter to Adjutant General Jesse F. Stevens requesting that the camp be discontinued "on the ground that it was a serious determent to the development of a considerable portion of the Cape". The letter accused the Guard of damaging property and using land without permission. In 1923, the units that were encamped at Camp Perkins the previous summer were ordered to Camp Devens instead.

In 1929, the Massachusetts National Guard returned to the former site of Camp Perkins when the 26th Division Air Service began performing training and maneuvers at Cape Cod Airfield.

== See also ==
- List of military installations in Massachusetts
