= Cape Cod Airfield =

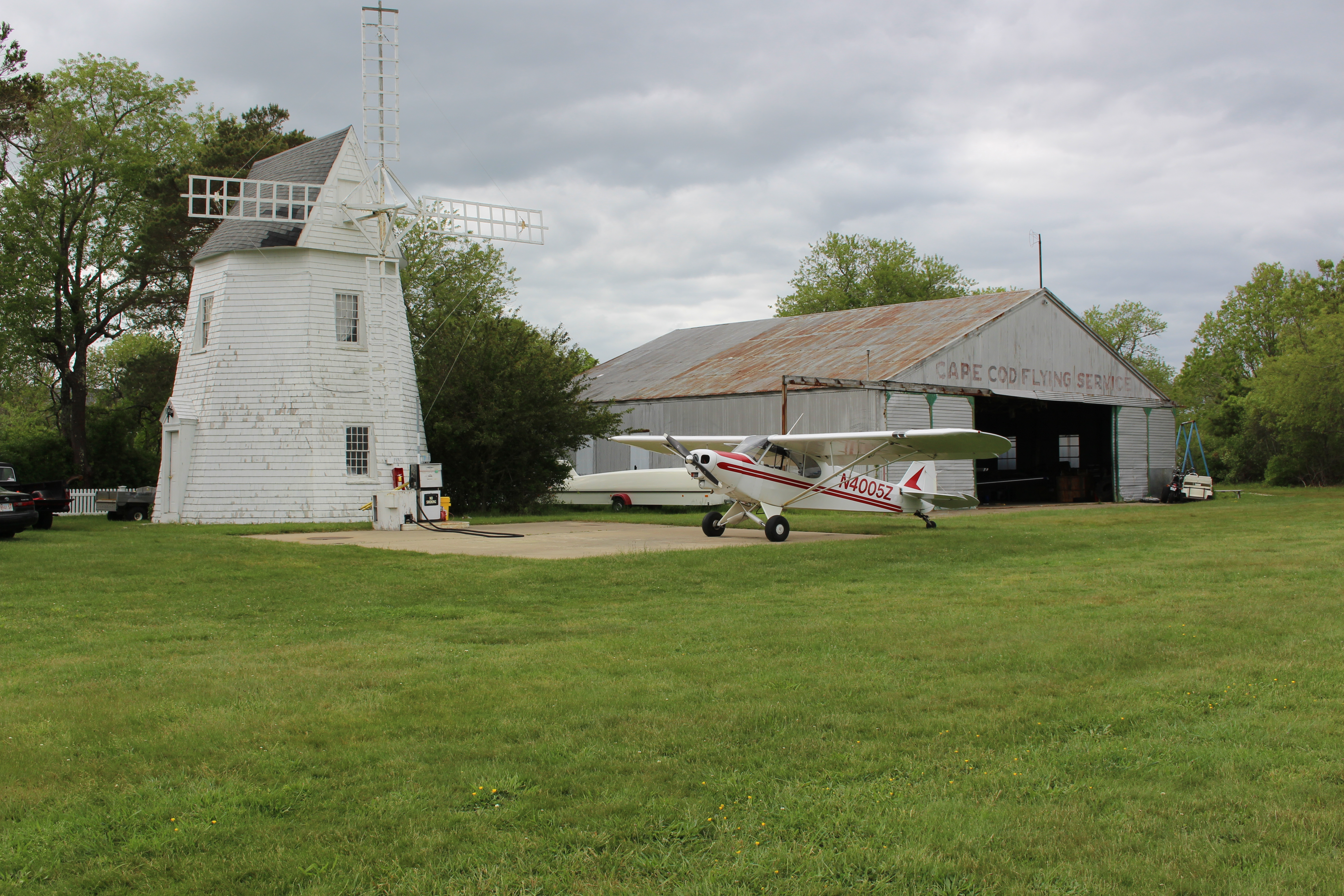
- IATA: none; ICAO: none; FAA LID: 2B1

Summary
- Airport type: Public
- Owner: Town of Barnstable
- Location: Marstons Mills, Massachusetts
- Elevation AMSL: 103 ft (31 m)
- Coordinates: 41°41′07.0″N 70°24′08.1″W
- Website: www.capecodairfield.com

Map
- Interactive map of Cape Cod Airfield

Cape Cod Airfield, (FAA LID: 2B1) in Marstons Mills, Massachusetts, United States, is a public airport owned by the Town of Barnstable.

== History ==
Cape Cod Airfield is located on the former site of Camp Perkins, a Massachusetts National Guard camp which was active on the site in 1921 and 1922. The airport was founded by Zenas Crocker, a World War I biplane pilot. It opened with a flying circus on July 4, 1929. During Prohibition, the biggest attraction at the airport was the nearby Aviation Country Club, which ran an open bar and night-club. The club was closed down by Zenas Crocker's brother - Laughlin Crocker who was the Sheriff of Barnstable County. From 1929 to 1934, the Massachusetts National Guard's aviation group held its summer encampment at the airport.

In 1930, the Skyways Flying School, run by Crocker's friend Crocker Snow, opened at the airport. In 1935, the property was acquired by Hilma and William H. Danforth, summer residents of Oyster Harbors. The Danforths used the property as a riding stable, polo field, and automobile race track as well as for their private aircraft and added a windmill to serve as an office building. The airport was opened for commercial service on May 8, 1946, when Mrs. Danforth leased the property to John C. Van Arsdale. Van Arsdale opened a flying school to take advantage of the G.I. Bill's flight training for World War II veterans. During this time, the stables were torn down and the Aviation Country Club moved to Hyannis, Massachusetts, where it became an Elks Club.

In 1949, Van Arsdale opened the Provincetown-Boston Airlines and eventually turned over control of the Cape Cod Airport to the Danforth's pilot Harry Kornhiser. Kornhiser expanded the operation to include airplane maintenance and reconditioning used aircraft for resale in addition to flight instruction. Kornhiser died in 1991 and his son Rick took over as airport manager. Under the younger Kornhiser, the airport saw gliders, blimps, and an occasional hot air balloon added to its flight operations. Kornhiser also towed advertising banners over nearby beaches. On April 17, 2000, Kornhiser died in a banner-towing accident near the Norfolk Airport. Laurel Kornhiser took over operations following her husband's death. In March 2003, a representative of the Danforth family informed Kornhiser that her lease would not be renewed and the airport would close.

In 2003, the Town of Barnstable purchased the 217-acre Danforth Property, which included the airport, for $11.2 million. The airport reopened in July 2004.

== See also ==
- List of airports in Massachusetts
