= William Marston House =

Historic house in Massachusetts, United States

- U.S. National Register of Historic Places
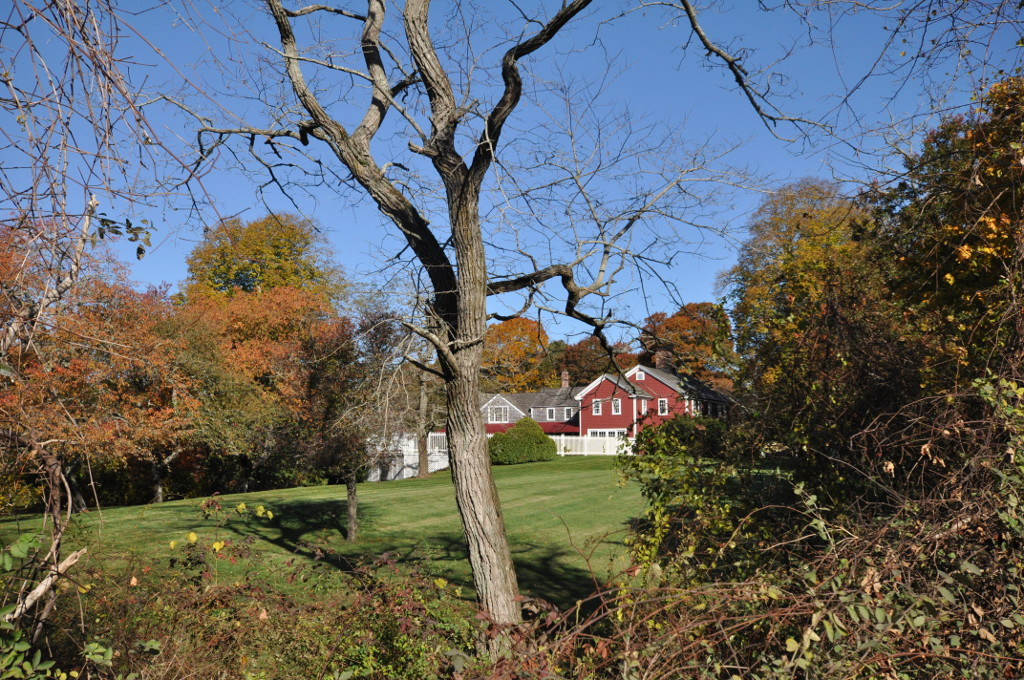

- Location within Cape Cod Location within Massachusetts Location within the United States
- Location: 71 Cotuit Rd., Barnstable, Massachusetts
- Coordinates: 41°39′8″N 70°24′53″W
- Built: 1780
- Architectural style: Georgian
- MPS: Barnstable MRA
- NRHP reference No.: 87000234
- Added to NRHP: March 13, 1987

The William Marston House is a historic house located in the Marstons Mills area of Barnstable, Massachusetts.

== Description and history ==
The 2 1/2-story wood-frame house was built c. 1780 by Benjamin Marston, from the third generation of Marstons that gave the area its name. It has a five-bay facade and a large central chimney, with a centered entry framed by pilasters and topped by a transom window and entablature. The building underwent a major restoration in the 1960s.

The house was listed on the National Register of Historic Places on March 13, 1987.

== See also ==
- National Register of Historic Places listings in Barnstable County, Massachusetts
