= John T. Olson =

United States Air Force general

- Born: April 7, 1929; Iowa City, Iowa, US
- Died: February 26, 2011 (aged 81); Marstons Mills, Massachusetts, US
- Burial place: Bourne, Massachusetts, US
- Military career
- Allegiance: United States
- Branch: United States Air Force
- Service years: 1952–1959; 1960-1986
- Rank: Brigadier general
- Commands: Air Commander, Air Technical Detachment, 102nd Fighter Interceptor Wing
- Conflicts: Korean War; Cold War; Vietnam War

John T. Olson (April 7, 1929 – February 26, 2011) was a brigadier general in the United States Air Force.

== Biography ==
=== Early life ===
Olson was born on April 7, 1929, in Iowa City, Iowa. He graduated from Cedar Falls High School and then attended the United States Military Academy where in 1952 he graduated with a bachelor's degree.

=== Military career ===
After graduation, he completed both Basic and Advanced Pilot Training. Subsequently, he became part of the 57th Fighter-Interceptor Squadron stationed at Presque Isle Air Force Base in Presque Isle, Maine. He was transferred to Greenland's Thule Air Base, and was active until 1956.

=== First return to civilian life ===
After leaving active duty, Olson enrolled in the Massachusetts Institute of Technology, and earned his master's degree in aeronautical engineering in 1959. During his time in the civilian realm, he went to work for the North American Aviation Company in Ohio, and became a project manager for the AVCO Systems Division while there.

=== Return to the military ===
In January 1960, he returned to the military, this time in Boston with the Massachusetts Air National Guard at Logan International Airport. During this time, the 102nd Tactical Fighter Wing was called to active duty to face the Berlin Crisis of 1961. He first served as Flight Commander and eventually as Squadron Operations Officer.

After returning to the United States in August 1962, Olson was progressively promoted. Simultaneously, he gained a series of positions with the 101st Tactical Fighter Squadron as well as the parent wing, the 102nd. His final position, taken on January 1, 1977, was the appointment to a full-time position as Air Commander, Air Technical Detachment of the 102nd.

=== Retirement and death ===
Olson retired in 1986 with the rank of brigadier general. Aircraft flown during his career included the T-6 Texan, T-28 Trojan, F-84 Thunderjet, F-89 Scorpion, F-100 Super Sabre and the F-106 Delta Dart. He died on February 26, 2011.
