= Provincetown-Boston Airlines Flight 1039 =

1984 aviation accident

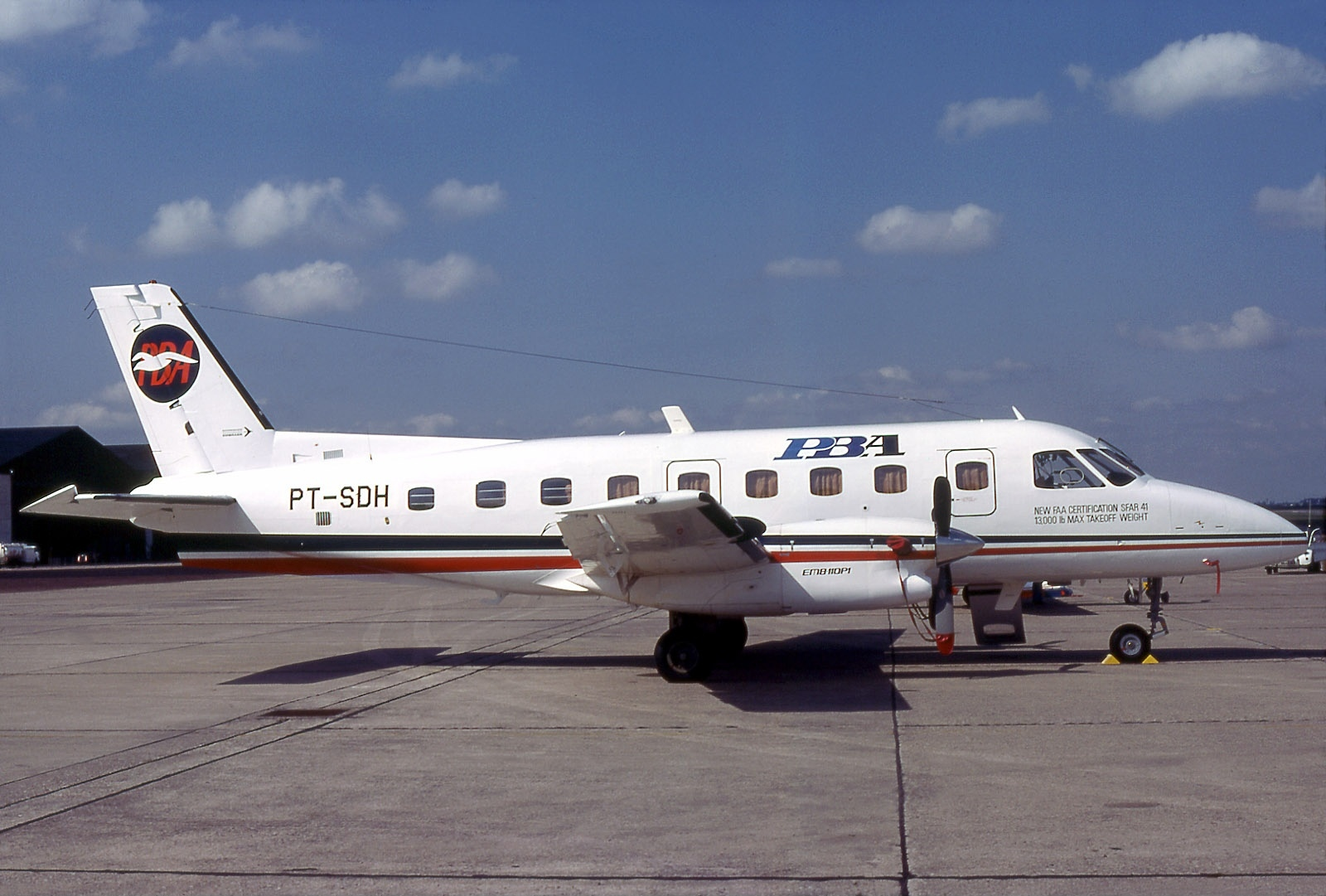
- A Provincetown-Boston Airlines Embraer EMB-110, similar to the one involved.

Accident
- Date: December 6, 1984
- Summary: Pitch system failure and pilot error leading to loss of control from elevator separation
- Site: Jacksonville International Airport; Jacksonville, Florida, United States; 30°29′N 81°41′W

Aircraft
- Aircraft type: Embraer EMB-110 Bandeirante
- Operator: Provincetown-Boston Airlines
- Registration: N96PB
- Flight origin: Jacksonville International Airport; Jacksonville, Florida
- Destination: Tampa International Airport; Tampa, Florida
- Occupants: 13
- Passengers: 11
- Crew: 2
- Fatalities: 13
- Survivors: 0

Provincetown-Boston Airlines Flight 1039 was a scheduled passenger flight from Jacksonville International Airport in Jacksonville, Florida, to Tampa International Airport, Florida. On December 6, 1984, the plane crashed upon takeoff at Jacksonville, killing all 13 passengers and crew.

== Background ==
Provincetown-Boston Airlines was a regional airline headquartered in Provincetown, Massachusetts. The airline had been grounded on November 10, 1984 for violating federal aviation safety rules, and began returning to service on November 25. Prior to being grounded, the airline carried more passengers than any other commuter airline in the United States.

On December 6, 1984, PBA operated Flight 1039 using an Embraer Bandeirante EMB-110P1 twin-turboprop regional airliner (registration N96PB). The EMB 110 was operated within its designed gross weight and center of gravity limits on the date of the accident. The aircraft was purchased by PBA in October 1981 and operated continuously by PBA until the accident, accumulating 5662 hours of operation and 7,858 cycles by the date of the accident.

Captain Thomas Ashby (34) was hired by PBA in 1974. At the time of the accident, he had accumulated approximately 10,000 hours of flying time, including approximately 400 hours in the EMB 110. First Officer Louis Fernandez (25) was hired in 1984, and had accumulated approximately 3,000 of flying time, including 500 hours in the EMB 110.

== Accident ==
PBA Flight 1039 was scheduled to depart Jacksonville at 6:08 p.m. Eastern Standard Time. (Note: All times provided are based on those given in the NTSB's final report, which are in Eastern Standard Time.) At 6:12 p.m., Flight 1039 received takeoff clearance and began its takeoff roll down Runway 31. At 6:13 p.m., the EMB 110 climbed above the departure end of Runway 31, Flight 1039 was told to switch to the departure control frequency, which he acknowledged with "OK, so long."

Thirty seconds later, witnesses saw the aircraft in a steep descent. The horizontal stabilizer, elevators, tail cone assembly, and part of the ventral fin separated from the aircraft while in flight. At 6:14 p.m., the EMB 110 crashed approximately 7,800 feet (2,400 m) beyond the end of Runway 31. The aircraft was destroyed by the impact and a post-crash fire; all 11 passengers and both crew members were killed by "severe impact forces which exceeded human tolerance."

== Investigation ==
The National Transportation Safety Board (NTSB) investigated the accident.

The NTSB found the horizontal stabilizer had separated from the EMB 110 in one piece, landing 1,100 feet short of the primary crash site. The tail cone and ventral fin separated along with the horizontal stabilizer. The left and right elevators separated from the horizontal stabilizer due to fractures in hinge brackets typical of overstress separations. As a result, the NTSB's investigation and analysis focused substantially on determining the sequence of, and the reasons for, the structural separations.

The hypotheses considered by the NTSB included:

- structural overload imposed by turbulence;
- structural failure as the result of preexisting structural weakness;
- the onset of a destructive aerodynamic phenomenon as the result of preexisting damage;
- the onset of destructive vibration produced by the imbalance of a damaged propeller; and
- the application of excessive aerodynamic loads as a result of one or more flight control system malfunctions.

The lack of a cockpit voice recorder (CVR) and flight data recorder (FDR) aboard the EMB 110 hampered the NTSB's ability to investigate the accident. At the time of the Flight 1039 accident, the Federal Aviation Administration had issued a notice of proposed rulemaking that would require installation of CVRs/FDRs on multi-engine turboprop passenger aircraft, but no such rule was finalized yet. The NTSB concluded that "installation of an FDR and CVR would have provided significant clues regarding the cause of this accident and remedied action needed to prevent recurrence."

Based on its investigations, the NTSB was able to determine multiple potential causes of an elevator control system or elevator trim system malfunction, any of which could have led the crew to take corrective actions that would result in an overstressed elevator control rod, and ultimately separation of the elevators and horizontal stabilizer. The NTSB issued its final report on June 24, 1986. In its report, it made the following statement regarding the probable cause of the accident:

The National Transportation Safety Board determines that the probable cause of this accident was a malfunction of either the elevator control system or elevator trim system, which resulted in an airplane pitch control problem. The reaction of the flightcrew to correct the pitch control problem overstressed the left elevator control rod, which resulted in asymmetrical elevator deflection and overstress failure of the horizontal stabilizer attachment structure. The Safety Board was not able to determine the precise problem with the pitch control system.

== Aftermath ==
The crash was the third in six months for PBA, which had just recently resumed service after its grounding by the FAA for safety violations. The crash shook public confidence in PBA, and customer bookings dropped by 75 percent. After filing for bankruptcy, the airline was purchased by People Express in 1986.
