= John C. Van Arsdale =

John C. Van Arsdale (December 4, 1919 – February 7, 1997) was the founder of Provincetown-Boston Airlines and a leader in the development of regional airlines in the United States.

== Early life and military service ==
He enlisted in the US Army Air Forces in 1942 and served during World War II.

== Aviation career ==
In May 1946, having returned from service in the Second World War, Van Arsdale started a flying school at the Cape Cod Airfield in Marstons Mills, Massachusetts on Cape Cod. This eventually turned into the Cape Cod Flying Service and, in 1949, led to the founding of Provincetown - Boston Airlines (PBA), Cape Cod's first scheduled air service. He served as President of PBA, as it grew into a regional carrier in New England and later in South Florida after merging with Naples Airlines in 1960. Van Arsdale ran the airline until 1980 when he turned it over to his two sons, Peter and John, Jr.

== Death ==
Van Arsdale died in Naples, Florida on February 7, 1997.
