= Marstons Mills Community Church =

Historic church in Massachusetts, United States

- Methodist Church
- U.S. National Register of Historic Places
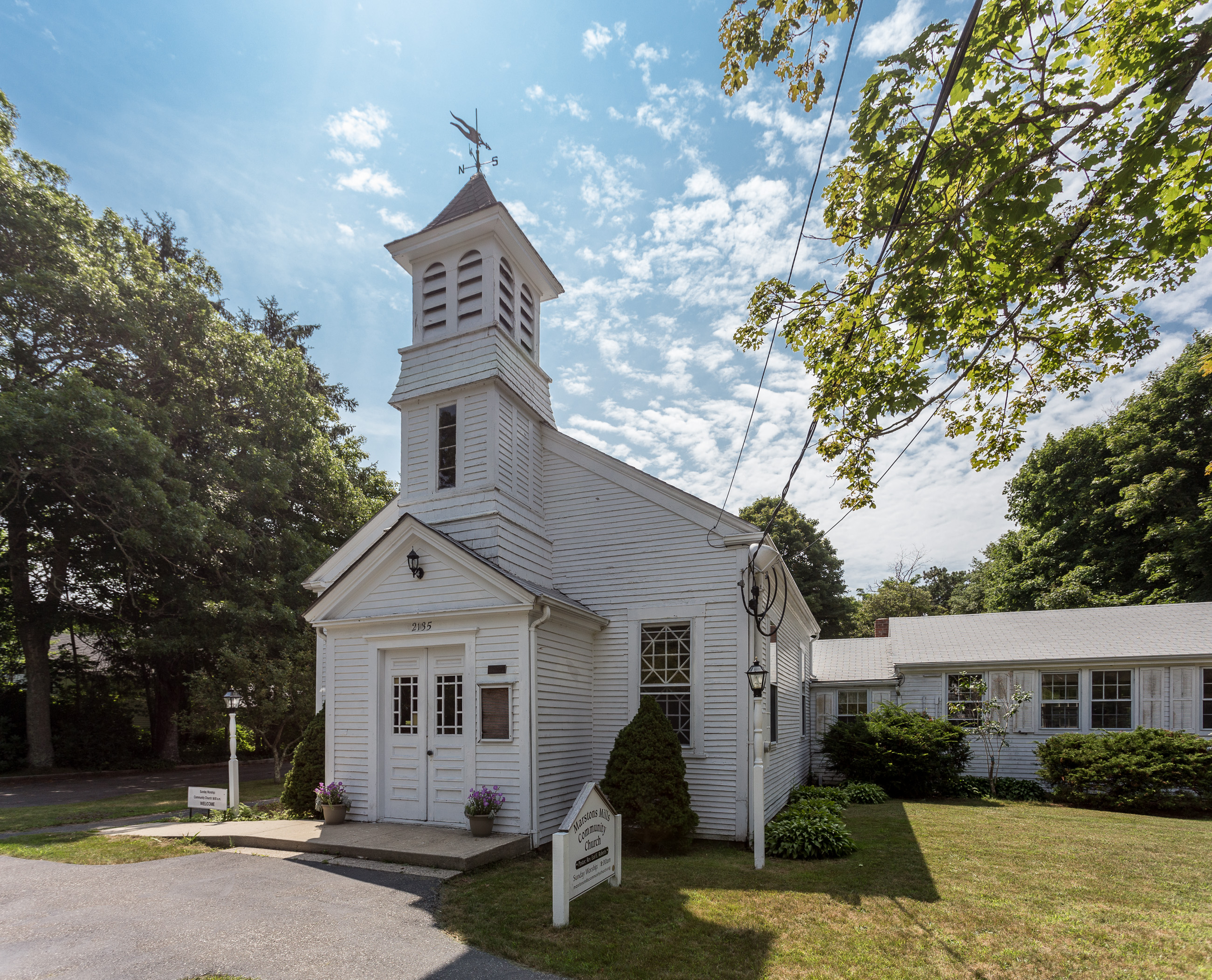
- Marstons Mills Community Church in 2014

- Location within Cape Cod Location within Massachusetts Location within the United States
- Location: 2135 Main Street, Barnstable, Massachusetts
- Coordinates: 41°39′14″N 70°24′43″W
- Built: 1830
- Architectural style: Greek Revival
- MPS: Barnstable MRA
- NRHP reference No.: 87000247
- Added to NRHP: March 13, 1987

The Marstons Mills Community Church, formerly the Methodist Church, is a historic church building in the Marstons Mills village of Barnstable, Massachusetts. The white clapboard church was built in the town of Yarmouth, and moved to Marstons Mills in 1830. Its small belfry tower was added sometime between 1888 and 1908, around the same time it acquired some of its Queen Anne stylistic elements. In 1987, the church was listed on the National Register of Historic Places for its architecture and for its role in community history.

== Description and history ==
The Marstons Mills Community Church is set on the south side of Main Street, a short way northeast of its junction with Cotuit Road (Massachusetts Route 149). It is a single-story wood-frame structure with a front-gable roof and clapboard siding. A gable-roofed entry vestibule projects from the main facade, with a double-door frame by a simple surround and a fully pedimented gable. The square church tower rises partly through the vestibule and partly through the main block. It consists of a series of sections, some stepped in and others stepped out, and includes a belfry stage that has paired round-arch louvers on each side. The tower is topped with a flared pyramidal roof and a weathervane. The windows flanking the vestibule have decorative sashes, a Queen Anne embellishment also appearing on the door windows.

The Methodist congregation of Marstons Mills was organized in 1826, though informal meetings in private spaces had occurred at least as early as 1819. This church building was hauled by oxen from Yarmouth in 1830 to serve as its sanctuary. Over the next 150 years, it went through a number of alterations, the most visible being the addition of Queen Anne styling to the tower and of a surplus military barracks as a parish hall. In 1968 the Marstons Mills congregation merged with that of Osterville, and this building was closed.

== See also ==
- National Register of Historic Places listings in Barnstable County, Massachusetts
