= Liberty Hall (Lamoni, Iowa) =

Historic house in Iowa, United States

- U.S. National Register of Historic Places
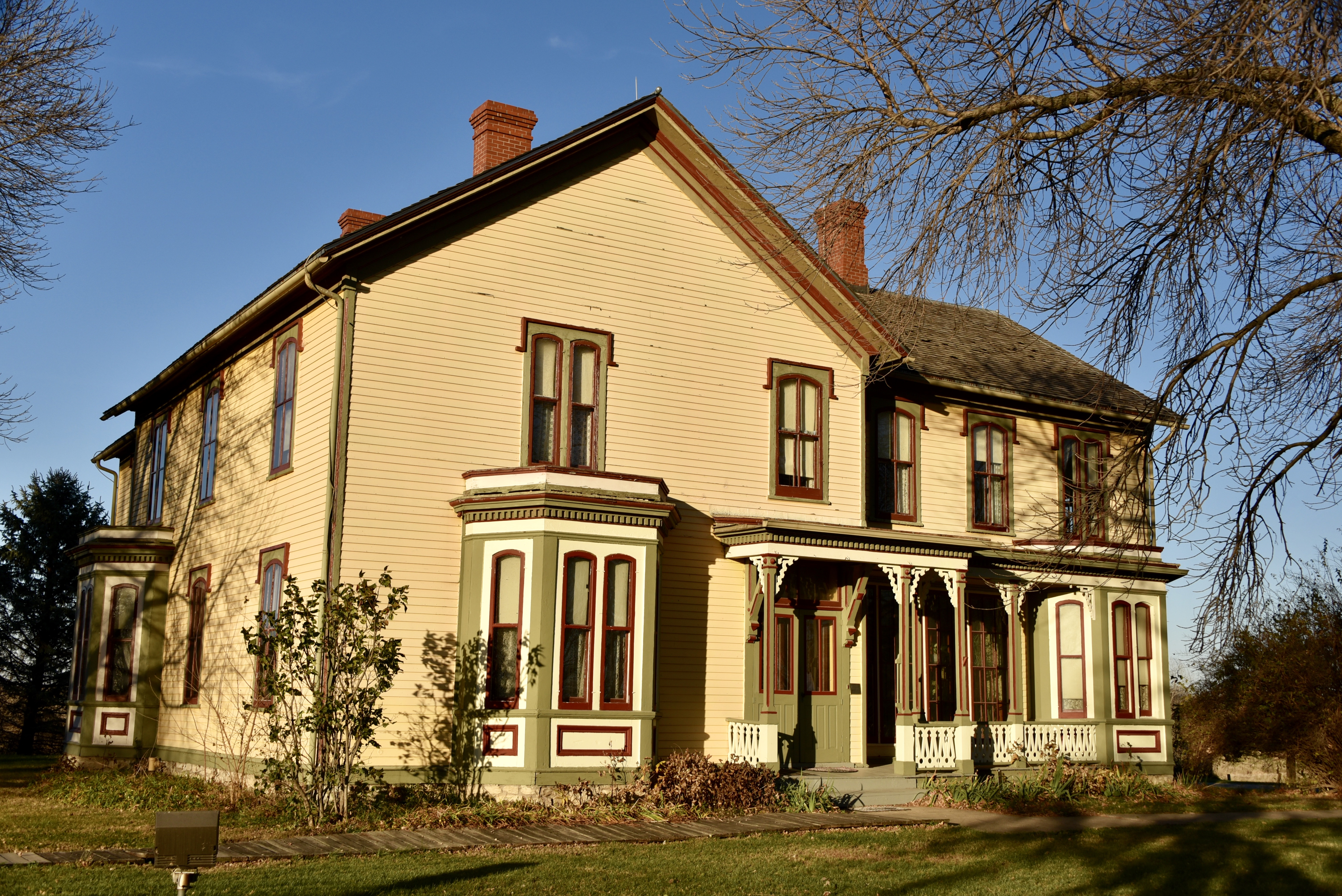

- Location within Iowa Location within the United States
- Location: Main St. Lamoni, Iowa
- Coordinates: 40°37′27″N 93°57′08″W
- Area: less than one acre
- Built: 1881
- Built by: Thomas Jacobs
- Architectural style: Late Victorian
- NRHP reference No.: 83000350
- Added to NRHP: September 29, 1983

Liberty Hall is a historic building located in Lamoni, Iowa, United States. The house, built in 1881, served as the residence of Joseph Smith III when he served as the president and prophet of the Reorganized Church of Jesus Christ of Latter Day Saints when it was headquartered in Lamoni. Local carpenter Thomas Jacobs built the house in a vernacular Victorian style. Smith left the house in 1906 when the church headquarters transferred to Independence, Missouri. Its name was changed to Liberty Home after 1906 when it became one of two church homes for aged members. In 1926 the house became a part of a church owned Holstein dairy operation, which closed due to the Great Depression in 1932. From 1934 to 1941 it housed a Civilian Conservation Corps office. After its service to the CCC it returned to being a church home for the aged. The church, now known as the Community of Christ, continues to operate the house as a museum. It was restored beginning in 1973 to look the way it did during Smith's occupancy. It was added to the National Register of Historic Places in 1983.
