= Heenan-Menfi Memorial Airport =

Former airfield in Massachusetts, US

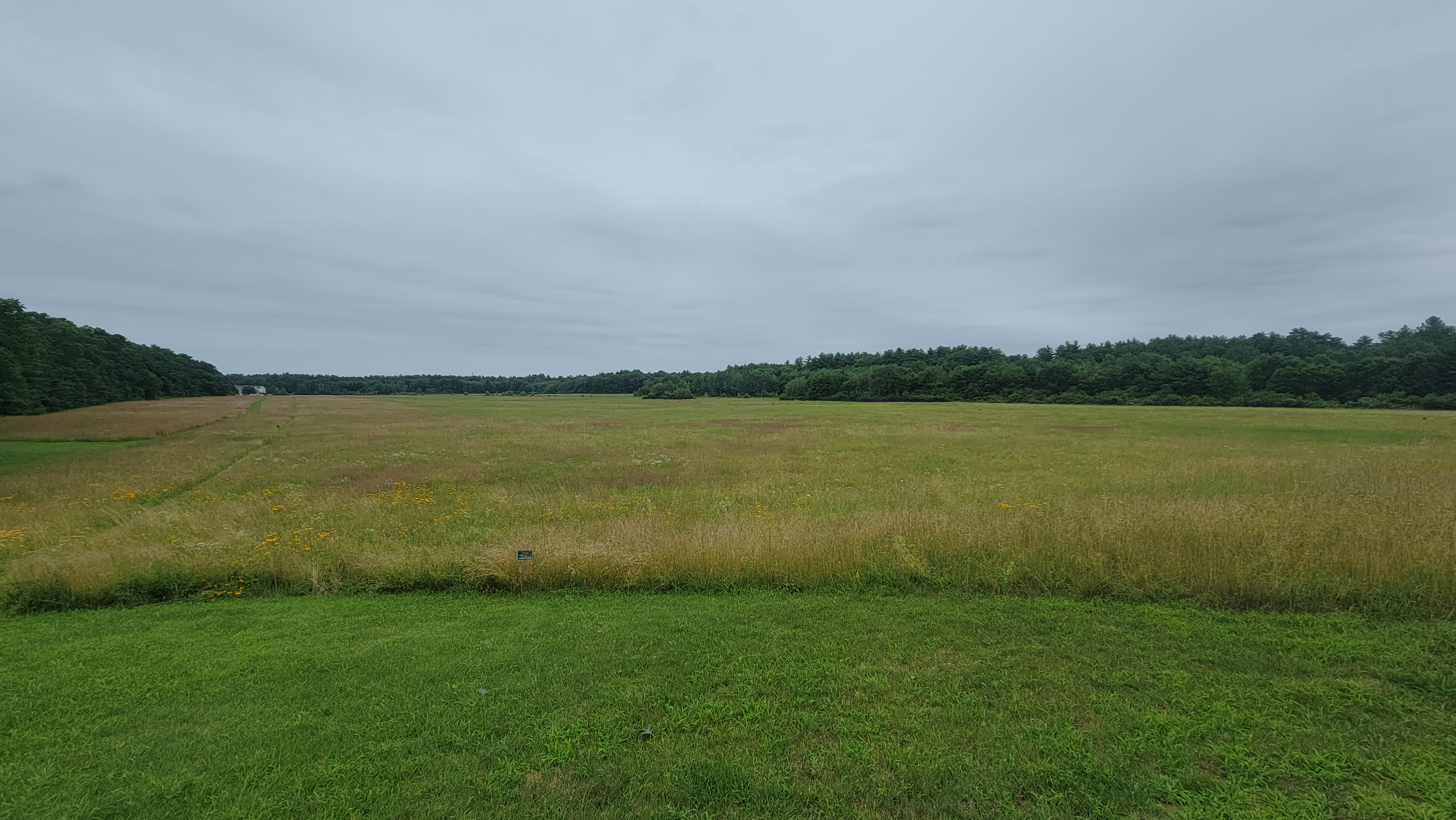
- Heenan-Menfi Memorial Airport
- IATA: none; ICAO: none

Summary
- Operator: Private
- Location: Norfolk, Massachusetts
- Built: Unknown
- In use: After 1945-1995
- Occupants: Private/Public
- Elevation AMSL: 134 ft / 41 m
- Coordinates: 42°7′41.58″N 71°22′15.40″W
- Interactive map of Heenan-Menfi Memorial Airport

Heenan-Menfi Memorial Airport, also known as Norfolk Airport and Franklin-Norfolk Airport, was an airfield operational in the mid-20th century in Norfolk, Massachusetts.

The airfield is named in remembrance for John Heenan and John Menfi, who died in a plane crash on July 12, 1991.
