= Massachusetts Route 149 =

State highway in Barnstable County, Massachusetts, US

Route 149
- Route 149 highlighted in red

Route information
- Maintained by MassDOT
- Length: 4.83 mi (7.77 km)

Major junctions
- South end: Route 28 in Marstons Mills
- US 6 in West Barnstable
- North end: Route 6A in West Barnstable

Location
- Country: United States
- State: Massachusetts
- Counties: Barnstable

Highway system
- Massachusetts State Highway System; Interstate; US; State
| ← Route 148 | → Route 150 |

Route 149 is a 4.83-mile-long (7.77 km) north–south highway on Cape Cod in southeastern Massachusetts. The route, located in Barnstable County, begins at an intersection with Route 28 in Marstons Mills, serving as the main road through the small community. The route crosses US 6 (the Mid-Cape Highway) before reaching a junction with Route 6A in West Barnstable. The route was a former designation of Route 49.

== Route description ==
Route 149 begins at an intersection with Route 28 (Falmouth Road) in the town of Barnstable, within the community of Marstons Mills. Passing Mill Pond, Route 149 proceeds northeast through Marstons Mills, as the two-lane Cotuit Road. In Marstons Mills, the route junctions with River Road and Main Street, a double fork in the center of the community. Route 149 passes multiple homes, leaving Marstons Mills as it passes Hamblin Pond. After Old Famouth Road, the highway winds north along the east side of the pond, and passes Cape Cod Airport.

Route 149 continues northeast along the western edge of Olde Barnstable Fairgrounds Golf Course, becoming Prospect Street after crossing through a rotary. The highway continues northeast through the West Barnstable Conservation Area. Route 149 runs northeast and into a partial cloverleaf interchange with US 6 (Mid-Cape Highway exit 65). Now in West Barnstable, Route 149 becomes Meetinghouse Way and reaches a junction with Route 6A (Main Street) in downtown West Barnstable, south of Sandy Neck Beach Park.

== Major intersections ==
The entire route is in Barnstable County.

| Location | mi | km | Destinations | Notes |
|---|---|---|---|---|
| Marstons Mills | 0.0 | 0.0 | Route 28 (Falmouth Road) | Southern terminus |
| West Barnstable | 3.8 | 6.1 | US 6 (Mid-Cape Highway) – Orleans, Provincetown, Boston, Providence RI | Exit 65 on US 6 |
| West Barnstable | 4.8 | 7.7 | Route 6A (Main Street) – Sandwich, Boston, Barnstable | Northern terminus |
1.000 mi = 1.609 km; 1.000 km = 0.621 mi
