= Liberty Hall (Camden, Alabama) =

Historic house in Alabama, United States

- U.S. National Register of Historic Places
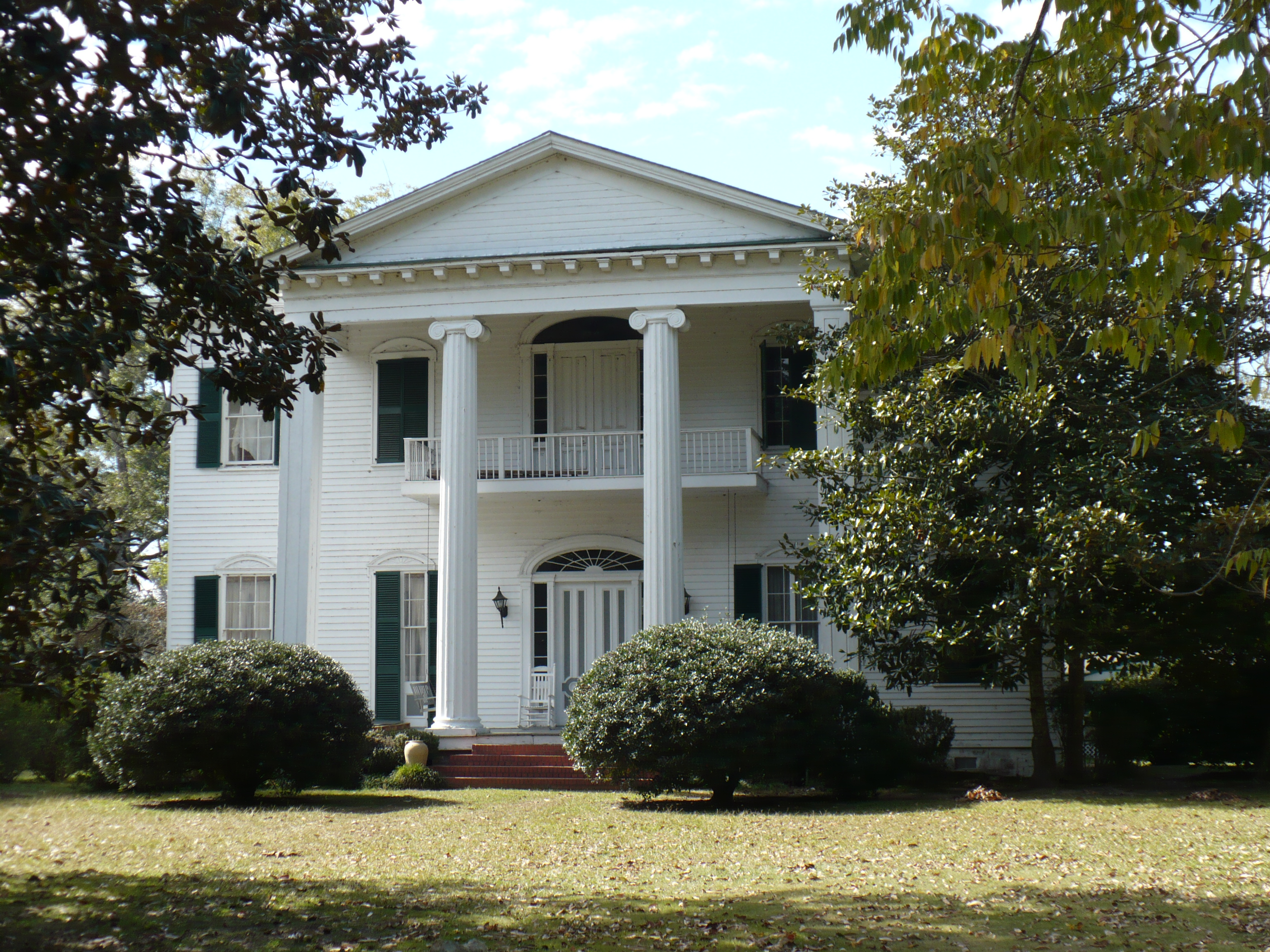
- Liberty Hall in 2008

- Location within Alabama Location within the United States
- Location: Camden, Alabama
- Coordinates: 31°58′22″N 87°20′7″W
- Built: 1855
- Architect: W.W. Robinson
- Architectural style: Greek Revival
- NRHP reference No.: 84000751
- Added to NRHP: January 5, 1984

Liberty Hall, also known as John Robert McDowell Place, is a historic plantation house near Camden, Alabama. The two-story Greek Revival style main house was built in 1855 for John Robert McDowell by W.W. Robinson. The two-story front portico features two central Ionic columns flanked by a square column to each side, reminiscent of a distyle-in-antis arrangement. The floor plan is centered on a broad hall that separates four large, equally proportioned rooms on both levels. The formal rooms and hall on the lower level have elaborate plasterwork that was designed, in part, by Harriet McDowell, wife of John Robert McDowell. The house is currently owned by the great-granddaughter of the original owner. It was added to the National Register of Historic Places on January 5, 1984.
