= Marstons Mills, Massachusetts =

Marstons Mills
- Village
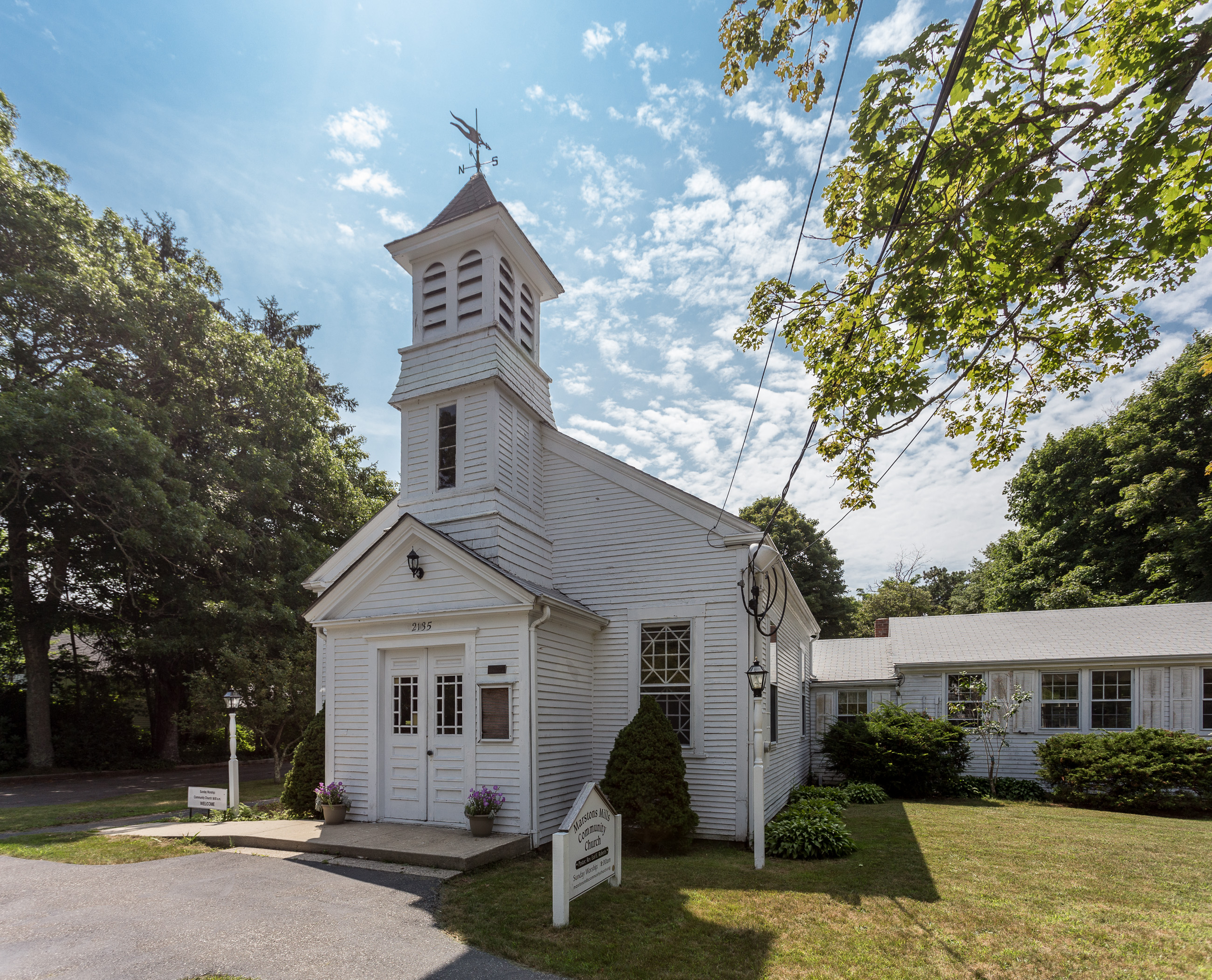
- Marston Mills Community Church

- Location of ZIP code 02648 Marstons Mills within the Town of Barnstable, county, and state
- Coordinates: 41°39′22″N 70°24′58″W
- Country: United States
- State: Massachusetts
- County: Barnstable
- Town: Barnstable
- Settled: c. 1653
- Time zone: UTC-5 (Eastern (EST))
  - Summer (DST): UTC-4 (EDT)
- ZIP codes: 02648

Marstons Mills (sometimes spelled Marston's Mills) is a village in the town of Barnstable, Massachusetts, United States. It is primarily residential, located on Massachusetts Route 28, and rural in nature. Main roads also include Massachusetts Route 149, Race Lane, River Road, Osterville-West Barnstable Road, and Santuit-Newtown Road.

== History ==
The village was first settled by Roger Goodspeed before 1653. His granddaughter Lydia married Benjamin Marston, who developed the fulling mill and weaving operations, giving the village its namesake. Benjamin built a cottage which stands today as the William Marston House, and is considered a historical building by the town.

== Physical formation ==
Marstons Mills is located on glacial outwash plains, the northern boundary of which is the moraine hills of the West Barnstable conservation lands. The plains consist of sands and gravels deposited by glacial meltwaters; to the south finer particles of silts and clays form good agricultural soils. Steep slopes overlook the Marstons Mills River and Little River. These river valleys were cut by much more powerful forerunners of the present rivers, which are little more than streams today. Stripped of vegetation, these slopes erode easily and can become unstable. Ponds are formed in deep kettle holes, the most notable of which are Mystic, Middle, and Hamblin.

== Main Street ==
Main Street in Marstons Mills is mostly residential, with Liberty Hall and the Marstons Mills Public Library located on the road. Marstons Mills Community Church is located near the former Marstons Mills Elementary School and across from Liberty Hall.

== Schools ==
Marstons Mills has two elementary schools, West Villages Elementary and Barnstable United Elementary School. West Villages Elementary School houses students grades K-3. From the mid-1990s until 2003, Barnstable Middle School at Marstons Mills housed grades 6 through 8. After the closing of the town's fifth grade building, the Marstons Mills Middle School recombined with Barnstable Middle School at Hyannis in Barnstable. The building that housed the former middle school was then converted to Barnstable Horace Mann Charter School (BHMCS), with students in grades 5 and 6. Students in grades 7 and 8 attend Barnstable Middle School (formerly Barnstable Middle School at Hyannis). In 2008 the Town of Barnstable closed three elementary schools. It made the BHMCS into a grade four and five school and Barnstable Middle School into Barnstable Intermediate School for grades six and seven. The eighth grade moved into Barnstable High School.

== Lakes ==
Marstons Mills has many notable lakes, cranberry bogs, and ponds, including Mystic Lake, Middle Pond, Hamblin Pond, and Shubael Pond. Marstons Mills has no saltwater beaches.

== Recreation ==
Burgess Park and the herring run provide leisure opportunities for adults and children of all ages. Burgess Park was purchased by the town in 1989 for its historic and scenic values. It has proven to be a very popular park for many different activities, most notably disc golf. The village survey revealed that this property is favored second only to the pond beaches and is also identified as one of the valued scenic views. Concern was expressed, however, for the incompatible nature and location of play equipment at Burgess Park. The Long Pond Conservation has a scenic bike path (off Newtown Road). The only grass airport left on the Cape is Cape Cod Airfield, which originally started in 1929 and was a Massachusetts Air National Guard summer training site in the 1930s. There is also the 18-hole Olde Barnstable Fairgrounds Golf Course, which is on the site of the old fairgrounds.

Although Cape Cod is known for its fishing industry, Marstons Mills' fishing is for recreation only, aside from Prince Cove which is the only gateway to the ocean. All but two bodies of water in the village are considered lakes for depth and water surface area. Fishing in the smaller ponds include mainly small perch and bass. Mercury in the fish is a concern in Mystic Lake. Hunting is less prevalent than fishing in Marstons Mills; the only hunting area is on conservation land in northwestern Marstons Mills, called West Barnstable Conservation. Hunting includes rabbit, deer, and wild turkey.

== Notable people ==
- Steve Bernard – adventurer and businessman, co-founder of Cape Cod Potato Chips
- Nancy B. Clark – philatelist
- Abraham Lincoln Filene – businessman and philanthropist
- Paul G. Kirk – lawyer and politician, Senator from Massachusetts (2009-2010) and chair of the Democratic National Committee (1985-1989)
- John T. Olson – U.S. Air Force brigadier general
- Henry Austin Scudder – state legislator and associate judge of the Superior Court of Massachusetts
- John C. Van Arsdale – aviator and businessman, founder of Provincetown-Boston Airlines
