= Provincetown-Boston Airlines =

US regional airline (1949–1989) merged into Britt

IATA	ICAO	Call sign
PT	PBA	PBA
- Founded: November 30, 1949; 76 years ago (in Provincetown, Massachusetts)
- Commenced operations: 1949; 77 years ago
- Ceased operations: 1989; 37 years ago (merged into Britt Airways)
- Hubs: See Hubs, routes, and destinations below
- Fleet size: See Fleet below
- Destinations: See Hubs, routes, and destinations below
- Parent company: People Express Airlines (1986–1987); Continental Airlines (1987–1989)
- Headquarters: Provincetown, Massachusetts, U.S.
- Founder: John C. Van Arsdale

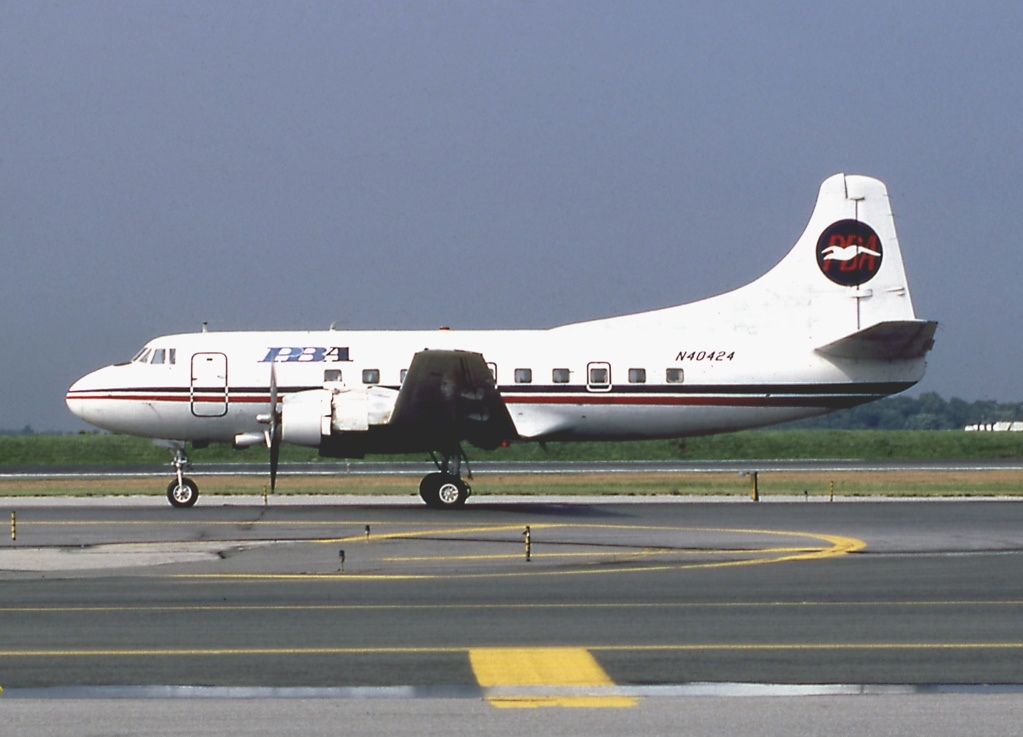
Martin 4-0-4 New York 1984

PBA Florida Network in 1982

Provincetown-Boston Airlines was a regional airline in the United States that operated from 1949 until it merged with Britt Airways in 1989. It operated a route network in New England, New York, Pennsylvania, and Florida, and at one time was the largest commuter airline in the United States before its purchase by People Express Airlines and then eventual consolidation with other commuter airlines into Continental Express, now United Express after the merger of Continental Airlines and United Airlines.

== Beginnings ==
On November 30, 1949, PBA was founded by John C. Van Arsdale in Provincetown, Massachusetts, and its first route was operated between Provincetown and Boston; hence its name. It was the successor to the Cape Cod Flying Service. Van Arsdale learned how to fly from his father at a young age, and loved flying. He became the manager of the Provincetown Airport, and started giving local residents rides to Boston in his airplane. Soon, Van Arsdale learned that people liked the idea of taking a 20-minute flight across the bay, and started the airline. He did the flying, while his wife Betty worked at the airport taking reservations. The aircraft of choice to start operations was the Cessna Bobcat.

== Expansion ==
By 1953, PBA expanded with more airplanes and pilots. PBA acquired the Lockheed Model 10 Electra and used it on the Provincetown route, and then expanded service to include Cape Cod Airfield in Marstons Mills (later moved to Hyannis). Since demand for travel to Provincetown and Hyannis falls off during the winter months, in 1957 a cooperation arrangement with Naples Airlines of Naples, Florida was started, allowing the PBA aircraft to be used in Florida during the winter months. By 1958, PBA had taken over Naples Airlines and merged the two airlines together.

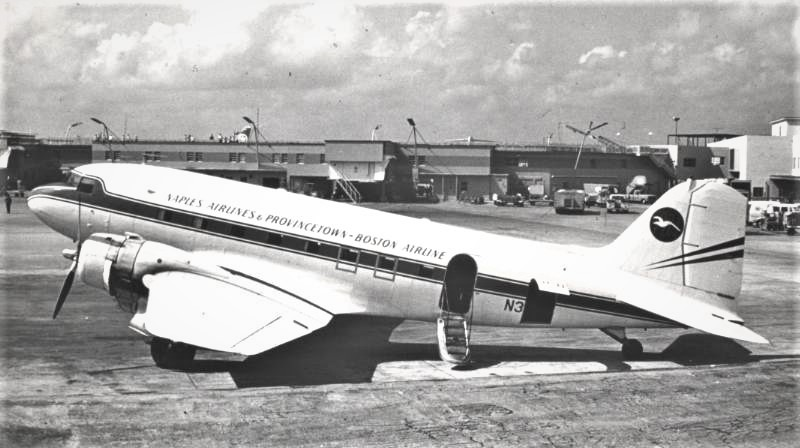
Provinceton-Boston Airline Douglas DC-3 at Miami International in 1971

In the following years, the route network in Florida and New England was expanded, and in 1968 a Douglas DC-3 was bought at $50,000 and refurbished at a cost of $150,000 to fill the demand. In 1975, a Martin 4-0-4 was added, and in 1980, PBA had a fleet of twelve DC-3s and four Martin 4-0-4s as well as a small number of smaller Cessnas and Pipers.

Seasonal expansion and contraction continued, but with year-round service to all locations. The larger aircraft were flown in New England during the busy summer months, with the smaller aircraft operating in Florida. In the winter months, the fleet would be swapped, with the DC-3s and Martin 404s migrating to Florida, and the Cessnas flying in the north. PBA also operated a flexible, demand-based schedule with its different fleet types, even in peak season. On days when demand was higher, the larger aircraft would be operated, but if bookings were light, the smaller aircraft would be used to save on fuel and operating expenses.

== More expansion and changes ==
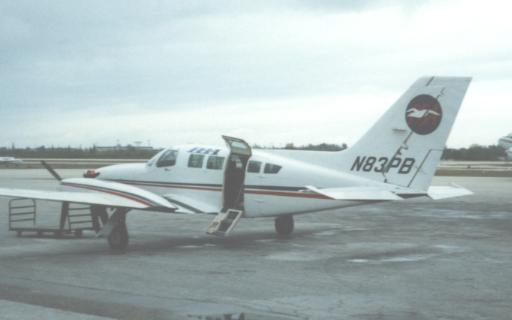
PBA Cessna 402C at Key West International in 1987 on scheduled flight to Miami

During the early 1980s the company expanded both in the north and in Florida. Two new aircraft types were introduced: the Embraer EMB-110 Bandeirante and the larger NAMC YS-11. PBA began operating flights to New York/LaGuardia with the longer range aircraft. Also at this time, Van Arsdale retired and turned the company over to his two sons, John-o and Peter. The two boys started expanding the company to an even greater degree. Soon thereafter, an interline agreement was signed with Delta Air Lines, and in 1982 PBA became a regional feeder for Eastern Airlines. By the mid-1980s, in addition to Provincetown, Boston, and Hyannis, PBA's northern routes reached Martha's Vineyard, Nantucket, New Bedford, MA and Burlington, VT. The Florida routes virtually covered the entire state from Jacksonville to Tampa, Naples, Miami, and Key West, as well as smaller cities in between.

The expansion and integration of all the new routes, aircraft and personnel brought about technical, safety and administrative shortcomings, which culminated in a crash on September 7, 1984. One person was killed and five injured, in the crash of the flight from Naples to Tampa that was mistakenly fueled with the wrong type of aircraft fuel. In November 1984, the FAA grounded the airline for this and many other safety violations. At the time of the shutdown by the FAA, PBA was the USA's largest commuter airline with 113 aircraft in the fleet. In December 1984, the airline was allowed to return to the skies, but then days later had another fatal crash. On December 6, 1984, 13 people were killed in the crash of an Embraer Bandeirante shortly after takeoff from Jacksonville FL. Mechanical problems were to blame for this crash. Confidence in the airline was lost, and the company was losing money.

Peter Van Arsdale turned to Hugh Culverhouse of the Tampa Bay Buccaneers football team for financial help for his ailing airline, in exchange for part ownership. The airline continued to lose money, Culverhouse gave up his investment, turning control back to Van Arsdale, and PBA filed for bankruptcy.

== People Express ==
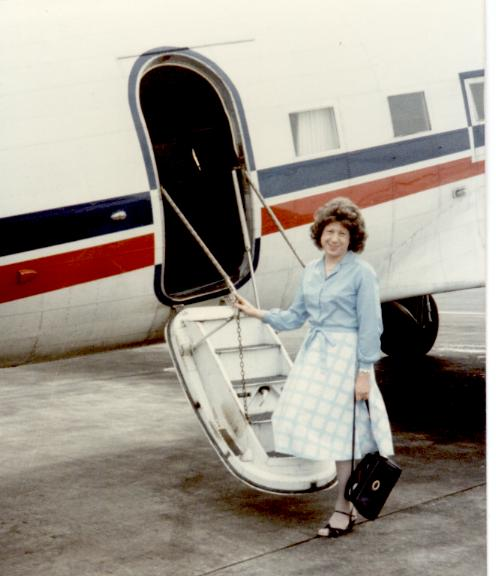
PBA operated pre-war DC-3s with right-hand passenger doors as late as 1987

In May 1986, People Express was approved to take PBA out of bankruptcy. People Express provided financing to keep PBA operating, and changed PBAs routes to feed into its own. Flights from LaGuardia were shifted over to the People Express hub and headquarters at Newark. In addition to PBA's existing routes to the Cape and Islands, People Express used PBA airplanes to expand to short-haul locations from Newark, including Philadelphia, Allentown PA, and Farmingdale/Republic Airport, Long Island. People Express also downgraded some of its Boeing 737 flights to PBA's YS-11s on routes from Newark to Providence and Albany. The Miami hub was closed, but flights continued from Jacksonville and the Tampa Bay area via the People Express location at St. Petersburg (PIE) airport rather than Tampa (TPA).

People Express had also purchased Frontier Airlines of Denver and Britt Airways of Terre Haute, Indiana. People Express itself experienced financial difficulties caused by its own expansion and as well as difficulty competing with established major airlines. On September 15, 1986, People Express agreed to a merger with Continental Airlines.

== Continental Airlines (Now United Airlines) ==
On February 1, 1987, People Express completed the merger with Continental Airlines, and PBA's fate again came into question. Continental enjoyed having the PBA feeder flights at Newark, operating the flights now with the Continental Express name. Additional service was added as Continental Express with PBA's EMB-110s from Newark to Binghamton, NY, New Haven, CT and Baltimore, MD.

Texas Air also owned Eastern Airlines in addition to Continental, and Eastern had a codeshare relationship with Bar Harbor Airlines in Florida and New England. Continental also owned Britt Airways from the People Express merger, and Rocky Mountain Airways of Denver. While Bar Harbor's New England routes did not overlap PBA's, the Florida routes were in direct competition, and Continental was investing in Bar Harbor through airplane purchases.

In April 1988, Continental acquired majority interest in Bar Harbor Airlines and began consolidating Bar Harbor with PBA. PBA flight crews started operating the new Bar Harbor Airlines ATR-42 turboprops from Hyannis to LaGuardia Airport and Newark. PBA's Cessna 402 airplanes started appearing on some Bar Harbor Airlines routes, such as Hartford/Bradley to New York/La Guardia. Because of the larger presence of Eastern Airlines in Boston and LaGuardia, PBA's flights to/from Boston and LaGuardia were rebranded as Eastern Express in 1988. (Texas Air Corporation controlled both Continental Airlines and Eastern Airlines.) Most of the classic DC-3s were repainted from PBA colors to the Eastern Express livery. Ironically, many of the PBA Douglas DC-3s were originally built for and operated as Eastern Airlines decades earlier. Florida flights were all now being operated with Bar Harbor's Saab 340, Beechcraft 1900C, and Beechcraft 99 turboprops as Eastern Express, while the PBA fleet was consolidated back in the Northeast for the last summer.

== The end of an era ==
In September 1988, Texas Air completed the consolidation of PBA with Bar Harbor Airlines. The PBA routes continued to have service as Continental Express and Eastern Express, but the old PBA Cessnas, Embraers, DC-3s, and YS-11s were all retired and replaced with the newer ATR-42s and Beech 1900s, now operating on the Bar Harbor Airlines certificate. The merger of the two carriers got off to a rocky start, as PBA flight crews were initially not given their seniority at the combined carrier for the first six months. Junior Bar Harbor pilots were able to get better positions than their more senior PBA coworkers. Some PBA captains who were formerly flying the ATRs under PBA were downgraded to the Beech 99s, while junior Bar Harbor pilots took their seats in the ATR-42s. Eventually seniority was integrated between the two workgroups.

Though the PBA name and logo were gone, much of the PBA ground staff, flight crews, and spirit remained on board, working for Continental Express. The PBA maintenance hangar and offices in Hyannis remained open, though downsized as a regional office for Continental Express. Continental ended service on the Provincetown-Boston route shortly after the merger in September 1988, but continued to operate most other PBA routes from Boston, LaGuardia, and Newark to the Cape and Islands with ATR-42, Beech 99 and Beech 1900 aircraft. The Provincetown route was briefly picked up by New Hampshire-based PAC Air, and then in 1989 by Cape Air.

== Beyond PBA ==
After the Eastern Airlines strike in March 1989, the company rebranded the PBA/Bar Harbor flights in New England and Florida from Eastern Express back to Continental Express, practically overnight, in order to keep the routes flying. Continental ticket stock was shipped out to the stations, and Continental trainers were deployed to teach the Eastern Express ground staff how to use Continental's reservations/check-in systems. As Eastern came back to life, the parent company decided to operate the PBA/Bar Harbor routes under what may have been one of the first dual codeshare agreements in the airline industry. Flights were now branded as both Continental Express and Eastern Express, and were sold in both systems under both the EA and CO airline codes. Employees joked about how long it took to answer the phone ("thank you for calling Continental Express/Eastern Express/Bar Harbor/PBA").

Continental then began the process of consolidating its four commuter carriers (PBA, Bar Harbor, Britt, Rocky Mountain) into one consolidated Continental Express carrier, serving its main hubs at Newark, Houston, and Denver. The combined carrier operated using the Britt Airways operating certificate. In the consolidation, PBA's Florida routes were spun off to Eastern Airlines, and continued to operate using Bar Harbor Airways aircraft and operating certificate as Eastern Express until the demise of Eastern Airlines. The PBA hubs at Boston and LaGuardia continued to operate for a little while longer.

In early 1991, Continental increased flights and destinations at LaGuardia airport after the shutdown of Eastern Airlines, and also increased the number of Continental Express flights and destinations at the airport. But after the end of the summer season in 1991, Continental decided to close the former PBA hubs at Boston and LaGuardia. Because some of the routes were operated under the federal Essential Air Service program, replacement service had to be obtained before the government would allow Continental to abandon some of the routes, most notably service to Martha's Vineyard, Bar Harbor ME, and Rockland, ME. An agreement was reached where Cape Air would operate year-round service between Boston and Martha's Vineyard, and Continental Express would continue to operate seasonal service from Newark to Martha's Vineyard, Nantucket, and Hyannis. Colgan Air picked up the routes from Boston to Maine. This then permitted Continental to completely close the Continental Express hubs at Boston and LaGuardia, as well as the PBA maintenance hangar and regional offices in Hyannis.

Cape Air slowly began adding other former PBA routes, and today resembles PBA, operating service to former PBA destinations in New England, and also occupying the former PBA hangar in Hyannis, though it no longer serves Florida. Today, Cape Air operates many of the former PBA Cessna 402 aircraft. Cape Air also operated two of the former PBA ATR-42 turboprops as United Express (formerly Continental Connection) carrier in Guam until the type was retired in 2018. Van Arsdale Sr (Old Man Van as he was affectionately called) even had a seat on the board of Cape Air until his death.

PBA's ATR-42s continued to operate flights for Continental Express in Newark for a number of years. Eventually, Continental retired the ATR-42s in favor of regional jets. Continental eventually spun off Continental Express into a private company, renamed ExpressJet Airlines. The only PBA route that continues to be operated today by Continental/United Express on a seasonal basis is Nantucket-Newark, operated by CommutAir with a de Havilland Canada DHC-8 Dash 8 turboprop. Cape Air also operates a seasonal Nantucket-White Plains NY route using their Cessna 402 aircraft.

== Fleet ==
- Cessna Bobcat
- Lockheed Model 10 Electra
- Piper Aztec
- Cessna 402
- Douglas DC-3
- Martin 4-0-4
- Embraer EMB 110 Bandeirante
- NAMC YS-11
- ATR-42

== Hubs, routes, and destinations ==
From: Boston, MA (BOS) to:

- Provincetown, MA (PVC)
- Marstons Mils, MA
- Hyannis, MA (HYA)
- Nantucket, MA (ACK)
- New Bedford, MA (EWB)
- Burlington, VT (BTV)

From: New York/LaGuardia (LGA) to:

- Hyannis, MA (HYA)
- Nantucket, MA (ACK)
- Martha's Vineyard, MA (MVY)
- New Bedford, MA (EWB)

From: New York/Newark (EWR) to:

- Hyannis, MA (HYA)
- Nantucket, MA (ACK)
- Martha's Vineyard, MA (MVY)
- New Bedford, MA (EWB)
- New Haven, CT (HVN)
- Philadelphia, PA (PHL)
- Farmingdale, NY - Long Island/Republic (FRG)
- Baltimore/Washington (BWI)
- Binghamton, NY (BGM)
- Allentown, PA (ABE)

From: Jacksonville, FL (JAX) to:

- Daytona Beach (DAB)
- Melbourne (MLB)
- Tallahassee (TLH)
- Pensacola (PNS)
- New Orleans (MSY)

From: Tampa, FL (TPA) and St. Petersburg, FL (PIE) to:

- Sarasota (SRQ)
- Fort Myers (FMY/RSW) (Note: Flights to/from Fort Myers operated from Page Field (FMY) until May 1983, when all commercial service was relocated to the newly-opened Southwest Florida Regional Airport (RSW))
- Naples (APF)
- Key West (EYW)
- West Palm Beach (PBI)
- Gainesville (GNV)
- Panama City (PFN)
- Tallahassee (TLH)
- Punta Gorda (PGD)
- Marco Island, FL (MRK)

From: Miami, FL (MIA) to:

- Marathon (MTH)
- Key West (EYW)
- Naples (APF)
- Fort Myers (FMY/RSW)
- Sarasota (SRQ)
- Fort Lauderdale (FLL)
- West Palm Beach (PBI)
- Melbourne (MLB)

== Accidents and incidents ==
- On December 6, 1984, Provincetown-Boston Airlines Flight 1039 crashed just after takeoff at Jacksonville International Airport. All 11 passengers and 2 crew members perished in the accident.

== See also ==
- List of defunct airlines of the United States
