= George Turnbull (engineer) =

- George Turnbull
- Born: 2 September 1809; Luncarty, Perth and Kinross (then Perthshire)
- Died: 26 February 1889 (aged 79); Rosehill, Abbots Langley, Hertfordshire, England
- Education: Perth Grammar School from 18 September 1819; Edinburgh University from 3 November 1824
- Spouses: Jane Pope, Fanny Thomas
- Children: Five by his wife Fanny Thomas .. two children died as infants in India
- Engineering career
- Discipline: Civil engineer
- Institutions: Institution of Civil Engineers 1838–1889
- Projects: East Indian railways; St Katharine Docks, London; West Bute dock, Cardiff; Middlesbrough Dock; Dover railway; Seacombe wall; Great Northern Railway (Great Britain)
- Awards: In 1863 gazetted by the Indian Government as the "First Railway Engineer in India". He was also offered a British knighthood.

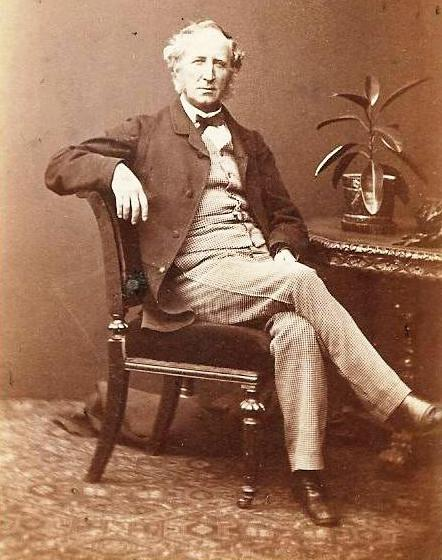
George Turnbull, 1868

George Turnbull (2 September 1809 – 26 February 1889) was a Scottish engineer. He was responsible from 1851 to 1863 for the construction of the first Indian long-distance railway line: Calcutta to Benares up beside the Ganges river, 541 miles (871 kilometres), (601 miles including branches). The main line was later extended to Delhi. He had some 100 British civil engineers and 118,000 Indian workers. All railway lines, engines etc etc were brought from Britain in ships (before the Suez Canal existed) -- most then went in Indian ships up the Ganges river, despite monsoons.

On completion, Turnbull was gazetted by the Indian government as the "First railway engineer of India". He declined a British knighthood.

== Early life ==
George Turnbull was born in Luncarty, 5 miles north of Perth, Scotland in 1809, the 11th and last child of William Turnbull and Mary Sandeman. Eight children were still living when the family moved in 1814 to nearby Huntingtower village, where his father successfully developed a linen bleachfield. His two grandfathers Hector Turnbull and William Sandeman had jointly developed bleachfields in Luncarty. Initially largely schooled by his older sister Mary, George in 1819 from age 10 rode a pony to Perth Grammar School. In 1824 he attended Edinburgh University learning Latin, Greek and mathematics. With one year for his father, he learned linen-manufacturing engineering and book-keeping.

== Career in England ==
In 1828 he sailed from Dundee to London to train under the famous civil engineer Thomas Telford building St Katharine Docks. In 1830 he became Telford's draughtsman and clerk, living in Telford's house in 24 Abingdon Street. He became an Associate of the Institution of Civil Engineers at age 19 and eventually the oldest member.

In 1832, he helped survey the options for supplying water to London both from the north and south, gauging the north-side rivers Colne, Gade, Lea, Odess and Ver; and on the south side the River Wandle. He was involved in 1833 with experiments for fast passenger canal boats on the Paddington Canal with Cubitt, Dundas and other prominent engineers.

In 1834 Telford died: Turnbull (Telford's young clerk) made arrangements for his house and correspondence and was involved with his burial in Westminster Abbey.

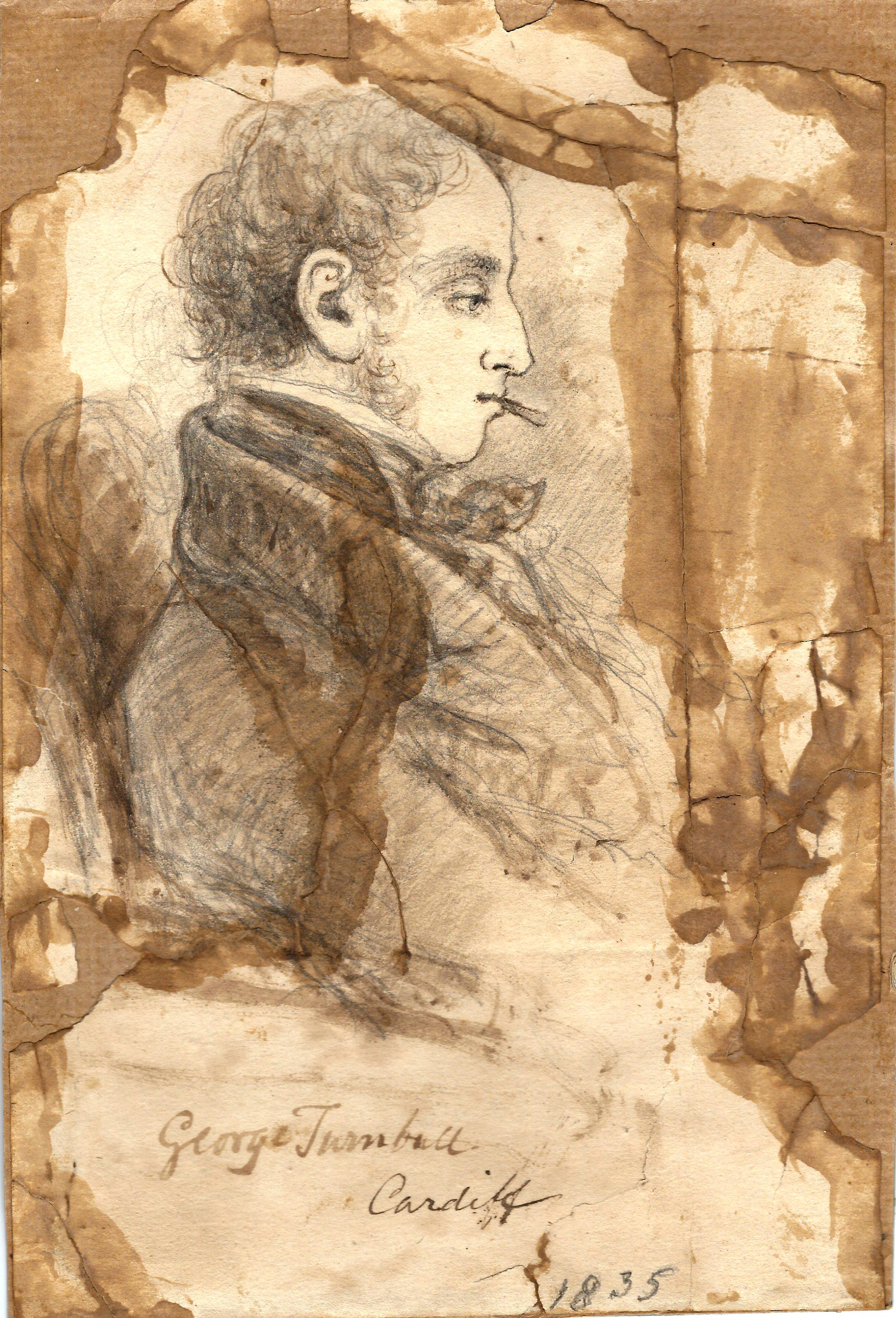
George Turnbull, 1835, Bute Docks, Cardiff, Wales

Turnbull was promoted to be resident engineer building the Bute Ship Canal and Bute Dock (now West Bute dock) in Cardiff, reporting to William Cubitt and meeting Lord Bute regularly.

In August 1836 George went to Bristol to see the 1 1/2-inch bar drawn between the River Avon's precipices for the future Clifton Suspension Bridge. Isambard Kingdom Brunel visited him at his Cardiff works in 1839.

Amongst other journeys, Turnbull's January 1837 diary records travel from Cardiff to his parents' Perthshire home: the mail coach to Bristol (with no then Severn Bridge or Severn Tunnel); all the next day Bristol to London "on Cooper's coach, sitting on the box seat outside with the coachman" (there was snow 10-feet deep near Marlborough); the steamer Perth for the 41-hour journey to Dundee; and then overland to Huntingtower, near Perth.

From 1840 to 1842 Turnbull built Middlesbrough Dock which was later bought by the Stockton and Darlington Railway. In 1841 he travelled through deep snow to Stirling to agree a contract to supply sleepers for the railway. In 1843 he was resident engineer for William Cubitt for the railway line from the Shakespeare Tunnel along the shore to Dover station (he entertained the Duke of Wellington, "pale, old and shaky on his legs", who visited the works) and built a pier and landing stages at Folkestone.

In 1845 he was the engineer in Birkenhead for the complex Seacombe Wall sea defence that helped drain the marshes behind the town of Seacombe.

In 1846-9 he was the resident engineer for the Great Northern Railway making cuttings and the South Mimms, Copenhagen and three other tunnels for the first 20 miles out of London, and making the first plans for King's Cross station.

== East Indian Railway ==
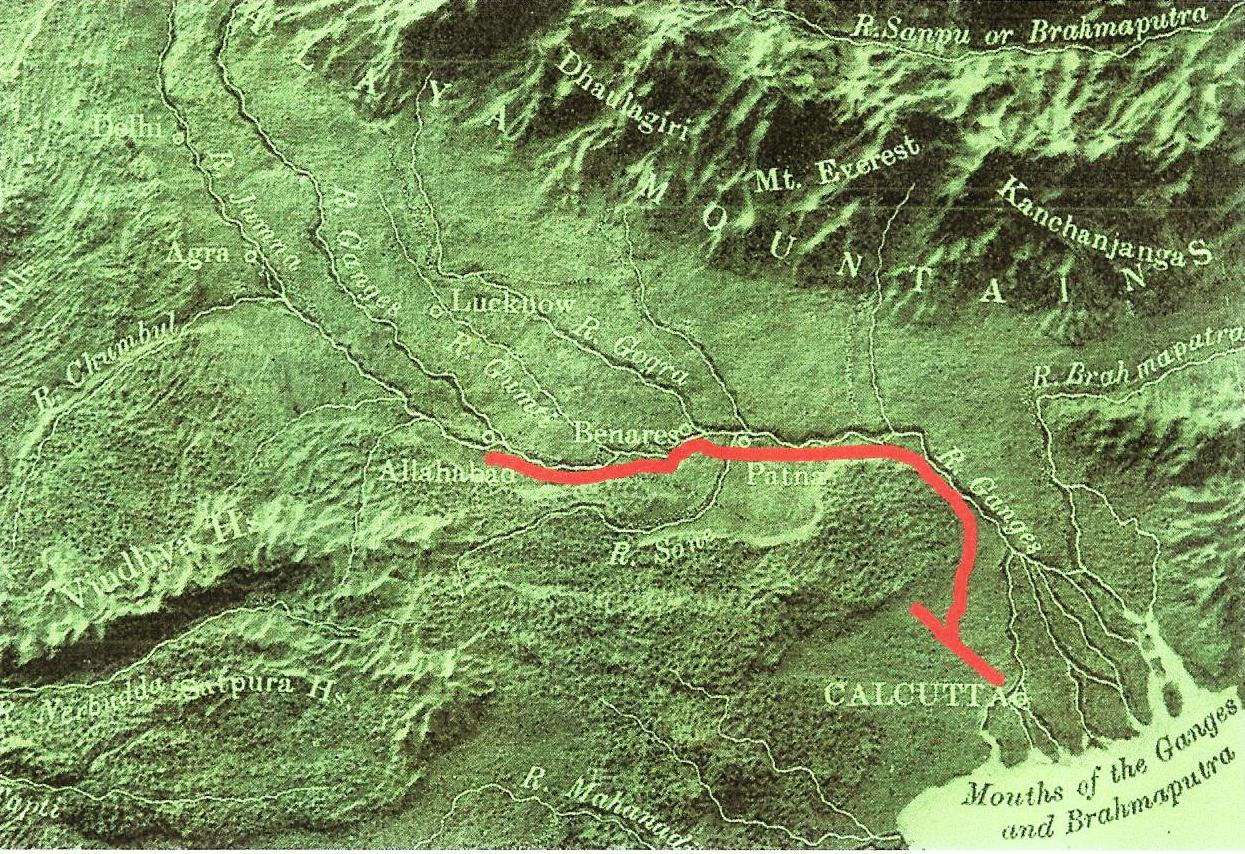
East Indian Railway built by George Turnbull

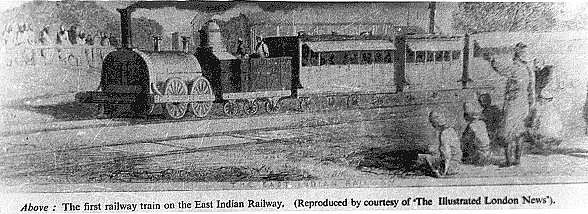
First train of the East Indian Railway, 1854

In 1850 he was appointed Chief Engineer of the East Indian Railway, building 1851–1862 India's first main-line railway 541 miles (871kms) from Calcutta to Benares, (on the route to Delhi); 601 miles (967kms) including branches. He designed Calcutta's terminus at Howrah which now has 23 platforms and the highest passenger and freight train-handling capacity of any station in India. The monsoon-ravaged Ganges tributaries, such as the wide Sone River were particularly challenging to bridge. Major constraints for Turnbull were the lack of both quality clay and local brick-building skills resulting in the change to importing nearly all ironwork from England (before the Suez canal) for the many bridges, rails, engines, etc as no Indian steel works existed. Another constraint was the difficulty of moving enormous volumes of materials from Calcutta up the Ganges on its primitive "country boats", particularly during the period of the Indian Mutiny when many boats were sunk and materials stolen. Cholera and other diseases killed hundreds of Indians and many of the over 100 English civil engineers.

== Offered a knighthood ==
Turnbull was offered a British knighthood for his railway building in India, but declined it as he felt that he did not have sufficient money to live to the standard he felt was needed (he later regretted declining the knighthood, if only because it reduced his later earning power).

== Calcutta drainage and sewerage ==
In 1856 the Bengal Government appointed Turnbull to be the Commissioner of Drainage and Sewerage.

== Calcutta University Syndicate ==
In 1861 Turnbull was appointed a member of the Syndicate of the Calcutta University.

== Sulkea Dock ==
In Calcutta in 1861 the Peninsular and Oriental Steam Navigation Company employed Turnbull to redesign the Sulkea Graving Dock, at Sulkea, and widen its entrance.

== Great Indian Peninsular Railway ==
In February 1868, Turnbull was offered £2000 to settle the claim by contractors who had built part of the Great Indian Peninsular Railway. He travelled via Marseille, Alexandria, train to Suez, and on to Bombay. He and others had a private train for four days "getting down and inspecting every bridge and large culvert" and making copious notes for the 389 km (242 mi) between Bhusawal and Nagpore.

== Personal life ==
In 1845 he married Jane Pope in St. Margaret's, Westminster. She died of fever on 23 August 1850 in Calcutta, only four months after arriving there. In 1855, after leave in England and on his way again to India, he married Fanny Thomas, the engineer William Cubitt's niece (in Neuchâtel, Switzerland because of concern that UK marriage to his deceased wife's half-sister might not be legal in England). Their first child [Ellen] Nelly was born on 14 July 1856 in Calcutta 9 months after their wedding. They had six children: their infants Jane and later Rose were born in Calcutta and successively buried in the same grave in Circular Road. Born in Calcutta on 17 March 1860 was their son George. Born in London were their son Alexander Duncan Turnbull on 10 March 1863 and daughter Katie on 4 June 1864.

The family retired to Cornwall Gardens in London and then in 1875 to Rosehill, Abbots Langley, Hertfordshire, England. The house Rosehill was built in the 1820s and demolished circa 1952. The house stood on Gallows Hill where the Gade View flats are today. He was the Vice-Chairman of the Assam Tea Company – his younger son (Alexander) Duncan Turnbull worked for the company in London and then Assam, where Duncan's daughter Doris was born in 1898. George Turnbull's wife Fanny died in 1903.

== Abbots Langley ==
Applying his engineering skills, Turnbull wrote the prospectus for the Abbots Langley Water Company and was much involved with the village's drainage and sewerage scheme in 1885. In March 1877, he also took a lease on 24 Collingham Place in London.

The village church includes a stained-glass memorial window with the inscription To the Glory of God in memory of George Turnbull C.E. born 1809 died 1889. It was donated by his widow Fanny.
