= John Glas =

Scottish theologian (1695–1773)

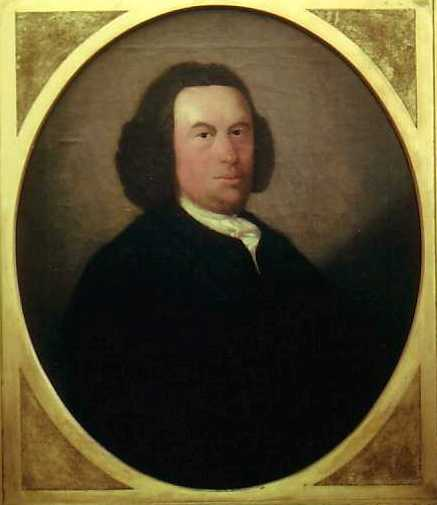
John Glas

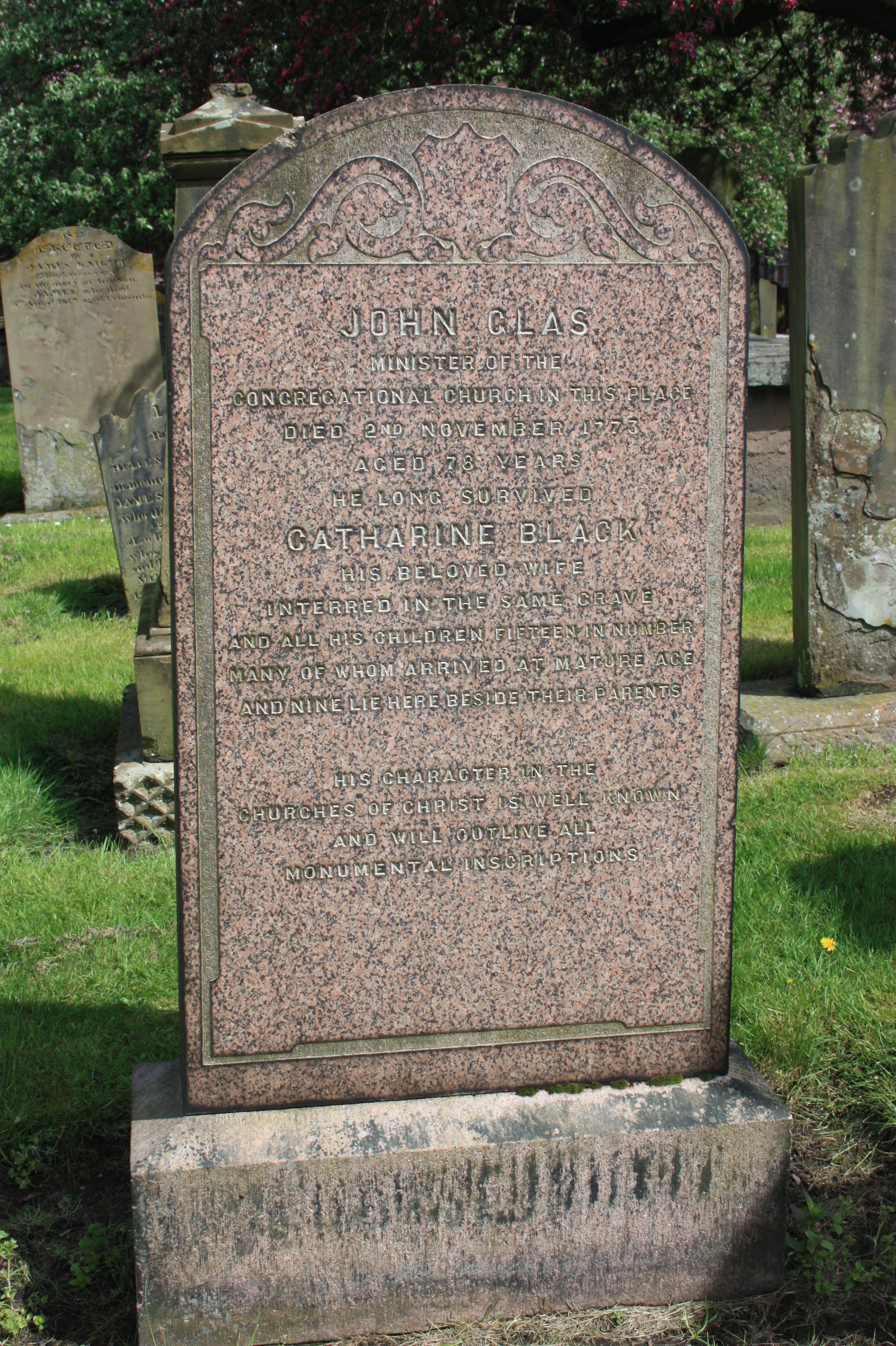
The grave of Rev John Glas, The Howff Cemetery, Dundee

John Glas (5 October 1695 – 2 November 1773) was a Scottish clergyman who started the Glasite church movement.

== Biography ==
=== Early years ===
He was born at Auchtermuchty, Fife, where his father was parish minister. He was educated at Kinclaven and Perth Grammar School, graduated from the University of St Andrews in 1713, and completed his education for the ministry at Edinburgh. He was licensed as a preacher by the presbytery of Dunkeld, and soon afterwards ordained by that of Dundee as minister of the parish of Tealing (1719), where his preaching soon drew a large congregation. Early in his ministry he was brought to a halt while lecturing on the Shorter Catechism by the question "How doth Christ execute the office of a king?" This led to an examination of the New Testament foundation of the Christian Church, and in 1725, in a letter to Francis Archibald, minister of Guthrie, Forfarshire, he repudiated the obligation of national covenants.

=== Separate society ===
In the same year he formed a society separate from the multitude, numbering nearly a hundred, and drawn from his own and neighbouring parishes. The members of this ecclesiola in ecclesia pledged themselves to join together in the Christian profession, to follow Christ the Lord as the righteousness of his people, to walk together in brotherly love, and in the duties of it, in subjection to Glas as their overseer in the Lord, to observe the Lord's Supper once a month and to submit themselves to the Lord's law for removing offences. From the scriptural doctrine of the essentially spiritual nature of the kingdom of Christ, Glas in his public teaching drew the conclusions that:

- there is no warrant in the New Testament for a national church
- the magistrate as such has no function in the church
- National Covenants are without scriptural grounds
- the true Reformation cannot be carried out by political and secular weapons but by the word and spirit of Christ only.

=== Treatise ===
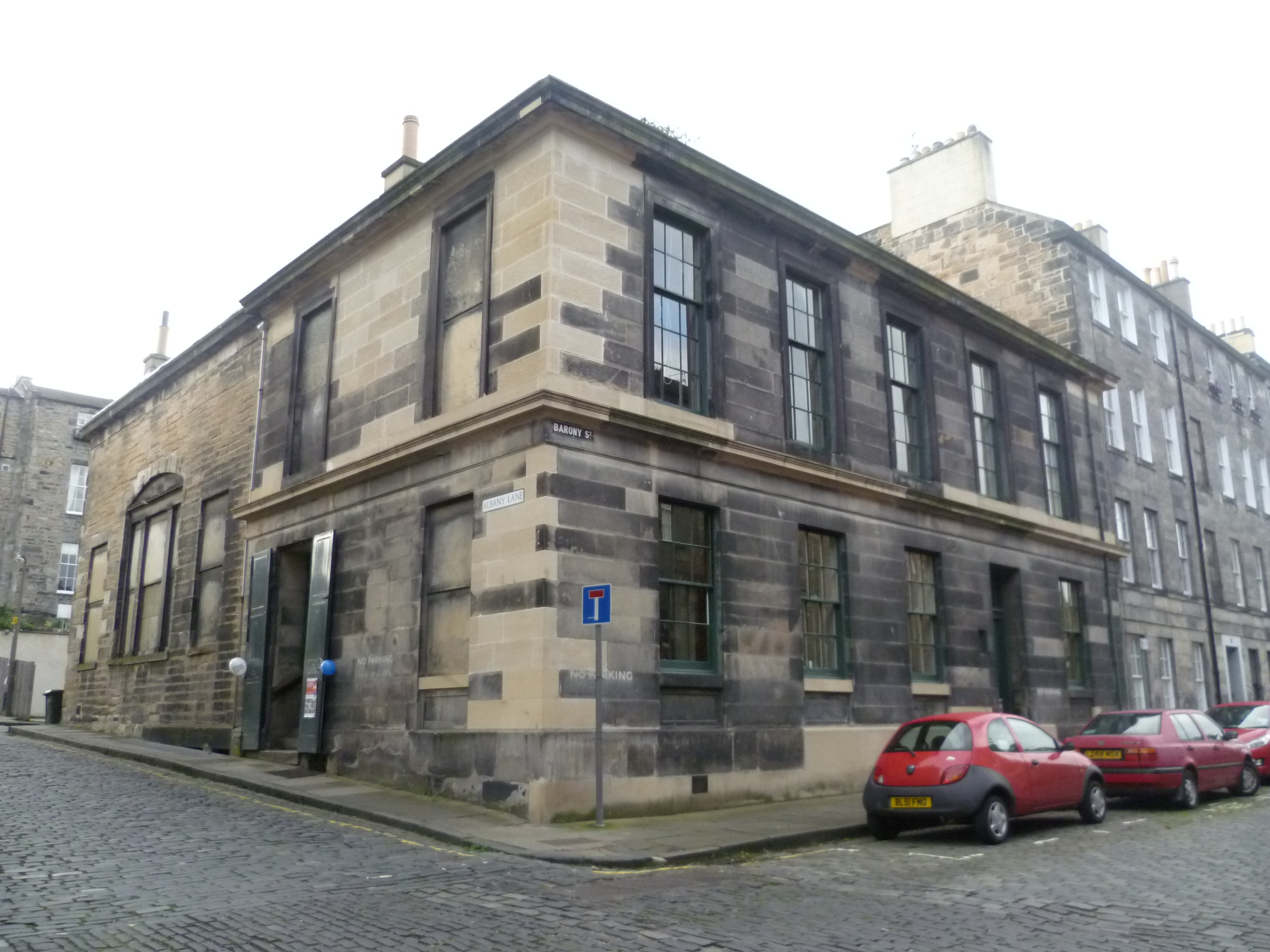
Glasite Meeting House, Edinburgh (1835)

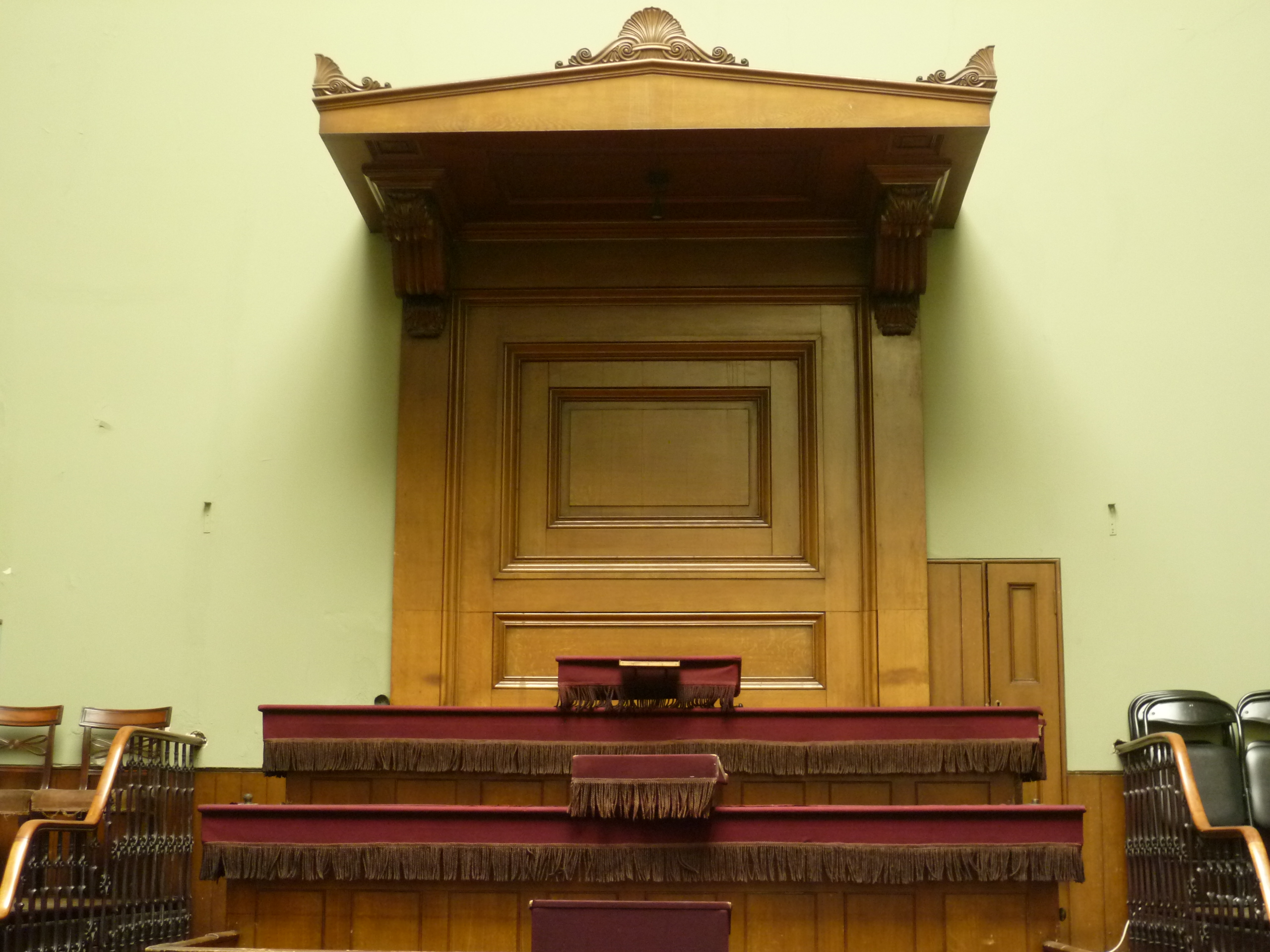
Glasite pulpit by David Bryce

This argument is most fully exhibited in a treatise entitled The Testimony of the King of Martyrs (1729). For the promulgation of these views, which were at variance with the doctrines of the national church of Scotland, he was summoned (1726) before his presbytery, where in the course of being investigated, he affirmed his belief that every national church established by the laws of earthly kingdoms is anti-Christian in its constitution and persecuting in its spirit, and further declared opinions upon the subject of church government which amounted to a repudiation of Presbyterianism and an acceptance of the puritan type of Independence.

=== Suspension from ministry ===
For these opinions he was in 1728 suspended from his ministerial functions, and finally deposed in 1730. The members of the society already referred to, however, for the most part continued to adhere to him, thus constituting the first Glassite or Glasite church. The seat of this congregation was shortly afterwards transferred to Dundee (whence Glas subsequently removed to Edinburgh), where he officiated for some time as an elder. He next laboured in Perth for a few years, where he was joined by Robert Sandeman, who married his daughter Catherine — eventually Sandeman was recognized as the leader and principal exponent of Glas's views; these he developed in a direction which laid them open to the charge of antinomianism.

=== Restoration to ministry ===
Ultimately in 1730 Glas returned to Dundee for the remainder of his life. He introduced in his church the primitive custom of the osculum pacis and the agape celebrated as a common meal with broth. From this custom his congregation was known as 'the kail kirk'. In 1739 the General Assembly, without any appeal from him, removed the sentence of deposition against him, and restored him to the status of a minister of the gospel of Christ, but not that of a minister of the Established Church of Scotland, declaring that he was not eligible for a charge until he should have renounced principles inconsistent with the constitution of the church.

=== Personal life ===
In 1721 Glas married Katherine Black, the youngest daughter of Rev Thomas Black of St John's Church in Perth. Black was Moderator of the General Assembly of the Church of Scotland.

The couple had a happy marriage and brought forth 15 children – all of whom predeceased him, as did his wife, who died of tuberculosis in 1749, 24 years before him. His son, captain George Glas R.N. was murdered along with his wife and daughter on board a treasure ship traveling from Tenerife to London in 1765. The case was notorious at the time and is believed to be the inspiration behind R.L. Stevenson’s ‘Treasure Island’. Stevenson grew up beside the Glasite church in Edinburgh and the family may have worshiped there. According to the accounts of the time, Glas was a most kind-hearted man, very fond of children, a most humane man, with not a trace of fanaticism or bigotry. One daughter Agnes Glas married Hector Turnbull who developed bleachfields in Luncarty near Perth.

John Glas died on 2 November 1773 and was buried at The Howff in Dundee on 5 November 1773. The grave lies in the south west near a north-south path. The original sandstone monument eroded and was replaced by a long-lasting red granite monument around 1880.

=== Non-Denominational Christianity ===
As Glas found inconsistencies with the Church of Scotland and what he found in the New Testament, he led a church movement during the first half of the 18th century which promoted the ideal that the church should be governed by the simple order in the New Testament rather than by human councils and synods. About thirty Churches of Christ were established in Great Britain through the efforts of Glas and others, including his son in law, Robert Sandeman. These churches emphasized the wearing of only New Testament names - usually "Church of Christ," taught baptism is for the remission of sins, and practiced a cappella singing in worship.

== Publications ==
Glas's published works bear witness to his vigorous mind and scholarly attainments. His reconstruction of the True Discourse ef Celsus (1753), from Origen's reply to it, is a competent and learned piece of work. The Testimony of the King of Martyrs concerning His Kingdom (1729) is a classic repudiation of erastianism and defence of the spiritual autonomy of the church under Jesus Christ. His common sense appears in his rejection of John Hutchinson's attempt to prove that the Bible supplies a complete system of physical science, and his shrewdness in his Notes on Scripture Texts (1747). He published a volume of Christian Songs (Perth, 1784; 13th ed., 1847). A collected edition of his works was published at Edinburgh in 1761 (4 vols., 8vo), and again at Perth in 1782 (5 vols., 8vo).

== Legacy ==
Though the Glasite Church is now 'extinct', certain former Glasite chapels, which tended to be of unusual form, survive, e.g. in Edinburgh, Dundee and Perth. The former Dundee Glasite church is still used for religious purposes, having been acquired by the adjacent St Andrew's Parish Church in 1973 and transformed into part of a complex of halls. The archives of the Glasite Church are held by Archive Services, University of Dundee.
