= Sandeman (wine) =

Portuguese wine and spirit company

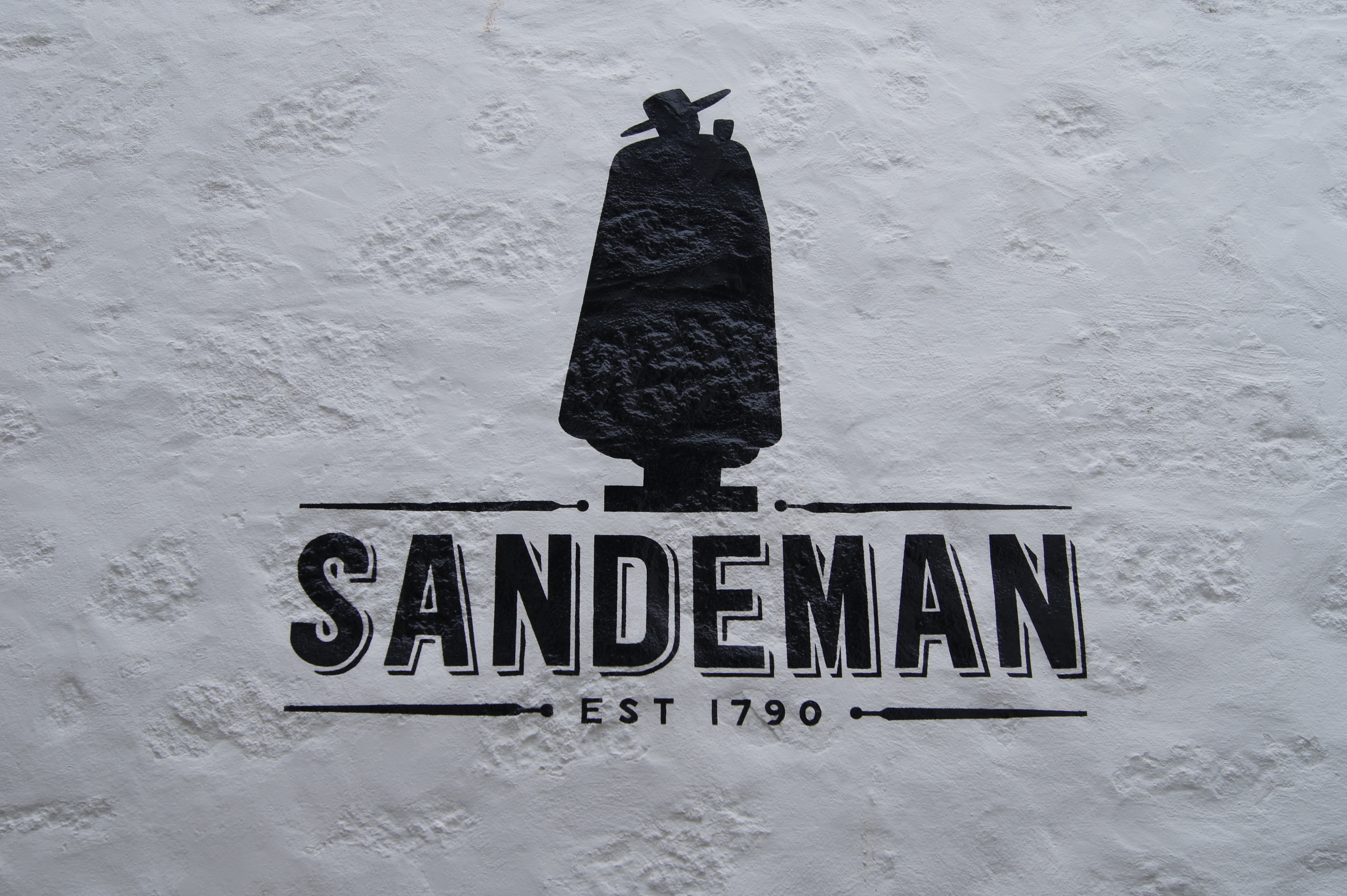
- Industry: Winery
- Genre: Port wine
- Founded: 1790; 236 years ago
- Founder: George Sandeman
- Headquarters: Largo Miguel Bombarda, 3 4400-222 Vila Nova de Gaia Portugal
- Area served: Worldwide
- Products: Port wine, Sherry, Brandy, Madeira wine
- Parent: Sogrape Vinhos, S.A.
- Website: www.sandeman.com

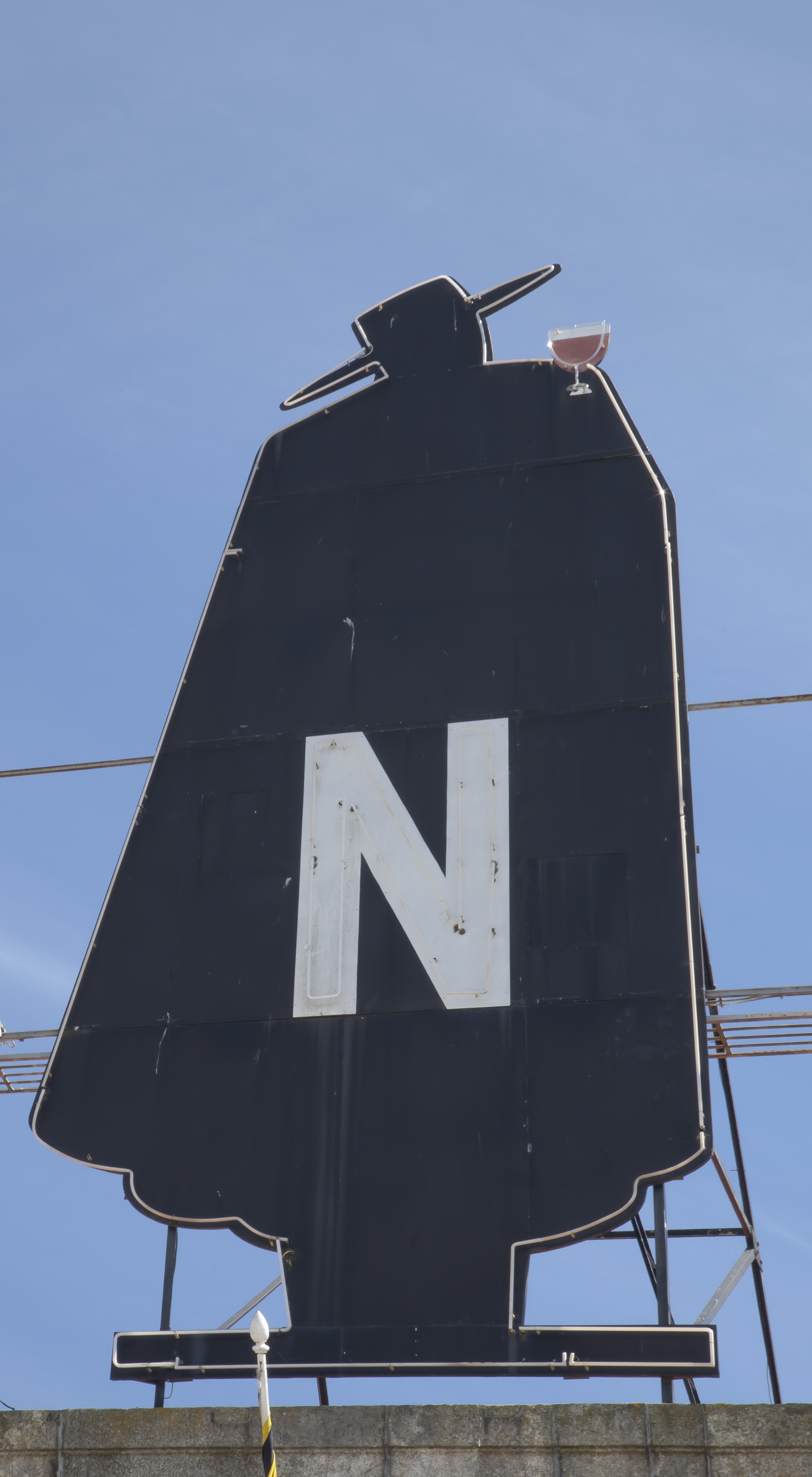
Logo of the cellar over the building in Vila Nova de Gaia, Portugal.

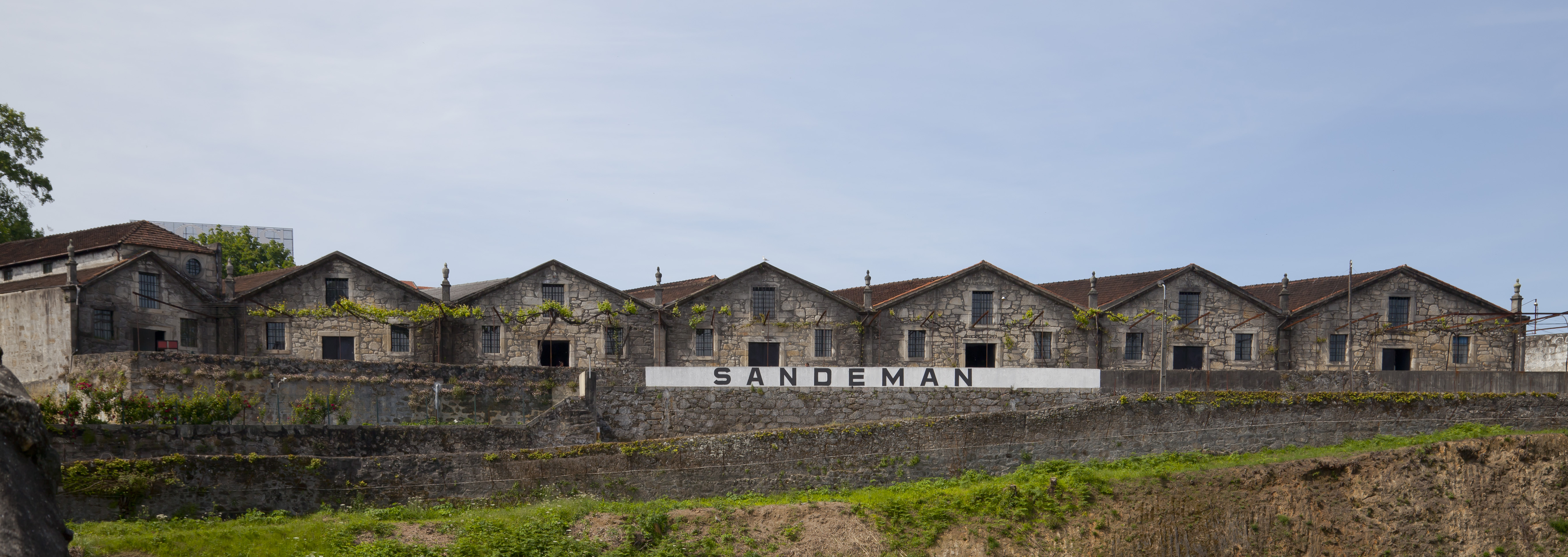
Sandeman cellars

Sandeman is a brand of port and sherry wines founded in 1790. Its well known logo features a caped man known as "The Don", dressed in a Portuguese student's cape and a wide traditional Andalusian-type hat. Besides Port and Sherry wines, it also produces brandy and Madeira wine.

== History ==
Brothers George and David Sandeman from Perth founded the company in 1790 with £300. David, more interested in banking than vintnering, left the company in 1798 to found the Commercial Bank of Scotland leaving George in sole charge.

In 1953, Sandeman bought the port company Robertson Brothers.

Initially passed to his nephew, George Glas Sandeman, Sandeman remained a family business until bought out by the drinks company Seagram in 1979. In 2001 the operation was sold to Sogrape by Diageo and Pernod Ricard who had acquired it from Seagram. A descendant, George Thomas David Sandeman is a member of the board of Sogrape Vinhos S.A.

=== Sandeman family ===
The founder George Sandeman, whose father was also George, was descended from the marriage of David Sandeman to Margret Ramsey in 1716, whose offspring included a notable Glasite theologian Robert Sandeman and the Perthshire linen manufacturer William Sandeman. Family descendants remained owners of the wine business until 1993. In the nineteenth century the family became associated with Hayling Island coming to live at Westfield House in West Town, Hayling Island and with a family grave in St. Mary's Church. The Hayling Golf Club was founded by Fleetwood Sandeman in 1883.

==== Lea & Sandeman ====
Lea & Sandeman is an independent wine merchant formed by Patrick Sandeman and Charles Lea in 1993. Patrick was a member of the Sandeman family who had initially worked for Seagram. He died in a skydiving accident in 2012 and his wife Katie succeeded him as a director.

== See also ==
- Albert George Sandeman – Chairman of company and former Governor of the Bank of England
