= Hector Turnbull (businessman) =

Scottish Textiles Manufacturer (1733 – 1788)

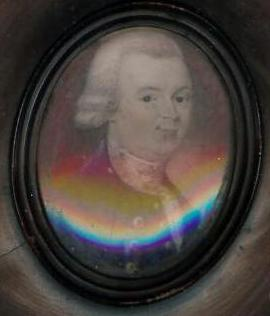
Ebony-framed miniature portrait with rear hand-written label "Luncarty. Hector Turnbull, grandfather of Mr Geo Turnbull. Died 1788 aged [?]65 years". Frame 9.1x8.6x2.2 cm

Hector Turnbull (1733 – 1788) was a leading Perthshire linen bleachfield developer and operator.

Hector was born in 1733 on his father William Turnbull's farm Blackadder Mains near the Blackadder Water river in southern Berwickshire, Scotland. He worked at the British Linen Company's bleachfield in Saltoun, East Lothian before moving in 1753 to Luncarty near Perth to be the business partner of William Sandeman who was leveling 12 acres (49,000 m^{2}) there to be bleachfields. By 1790, the Luncarty bleachfields covered 80 acres (320,000 m^{2}) and processed 500,000 square yards of cloth annually.

On 7 December 1756 he married Agnes Glas, the daughter of John Glas, the founder of the Glasites: they had four children before she died. He married Mary Walker on 28 October 1761: they had more 16 children. Five of the children married five of the 16 children of his bleachfields partner William Sandeman. One son William Turnbull established the bleachfield at Huntingtower. One grandchild was George Turnbull, the Chief Engineer building in the 1850s the first railway in eastern India. Hector died in 1788. Hector had a brother Lt Colonel George Turnbull who fought in America.
