= Fernando Van Zeller Guedes =

Portuguese winemaker (1903–1987)

- Born: 4 February 1903; Massarelos, Porto, Portugal
- Died: 15 July 1987 (aged 84); Porto
- Occupation: Winemaker
- Known for: Developing the Mateus Rosé wine

Fernando Van Zeller Guedes (4 February 1903 – 15 July 1987), was a Portuguese co-founder of the international wine producer, Sogrape, and the inspiration behind the Mateus brand of rosé wine.

== Early life ==
Fernando Van Zeller Guedes was born on 4 February 1903 in the parish of Massarelos in the municipality of Porto in Portugal. His father, Fernando Guedes da Silva, owned Quinta da Aveleda, a wine estate near Penafiel, and was one of the founders of the Comissão de Viticultura da Região dos Vinhos Verdes (Viticultural Commission of Vinhos Verdes) in 1926, the entity that regulates the wine production of the region and that assures the recognition of its wines.

He contracted pneumonia at a young age, which interrupted his studies. At the age of 21 he joined Martinez Gassiot, an exporter of Port wines. On the death of his father, he became co-owner of the Quinta with his five brothers.

== Development of Mateus Rosé ==
In 1942, Guedes, his brothers and others, founded the Sociedade Comercial dos Vinhos de Mesa de Portugal, the forerunner of Sogrape, now Portugal's largest wine producer, in order to address marketing difficulties for Portuguese wine caused by World War II. This was to be done by exporting table wines to Brazil which, like Portugal, was not involved in the war. Prior to the war, the Douro region was primarily a producer of Port wine, for which the United Kingdom was a major market. Together with Eugène Hellis, the winemaker for Quinta da Aveleda, he developed Mateus Rosé, one of the first commercialized rosé wines. The wine was intended to have a broad appeal and, while rosé wines were rare in Portugal, Guedes decided to produce one, hoping it would appeal to women as well as men, and to new drinkers of wine. As part of the marketing approach, Guedes decided on a new shape for the bottle to be used for Mateus, based on the shape of flasks or canteens used by soldiers during World War I.

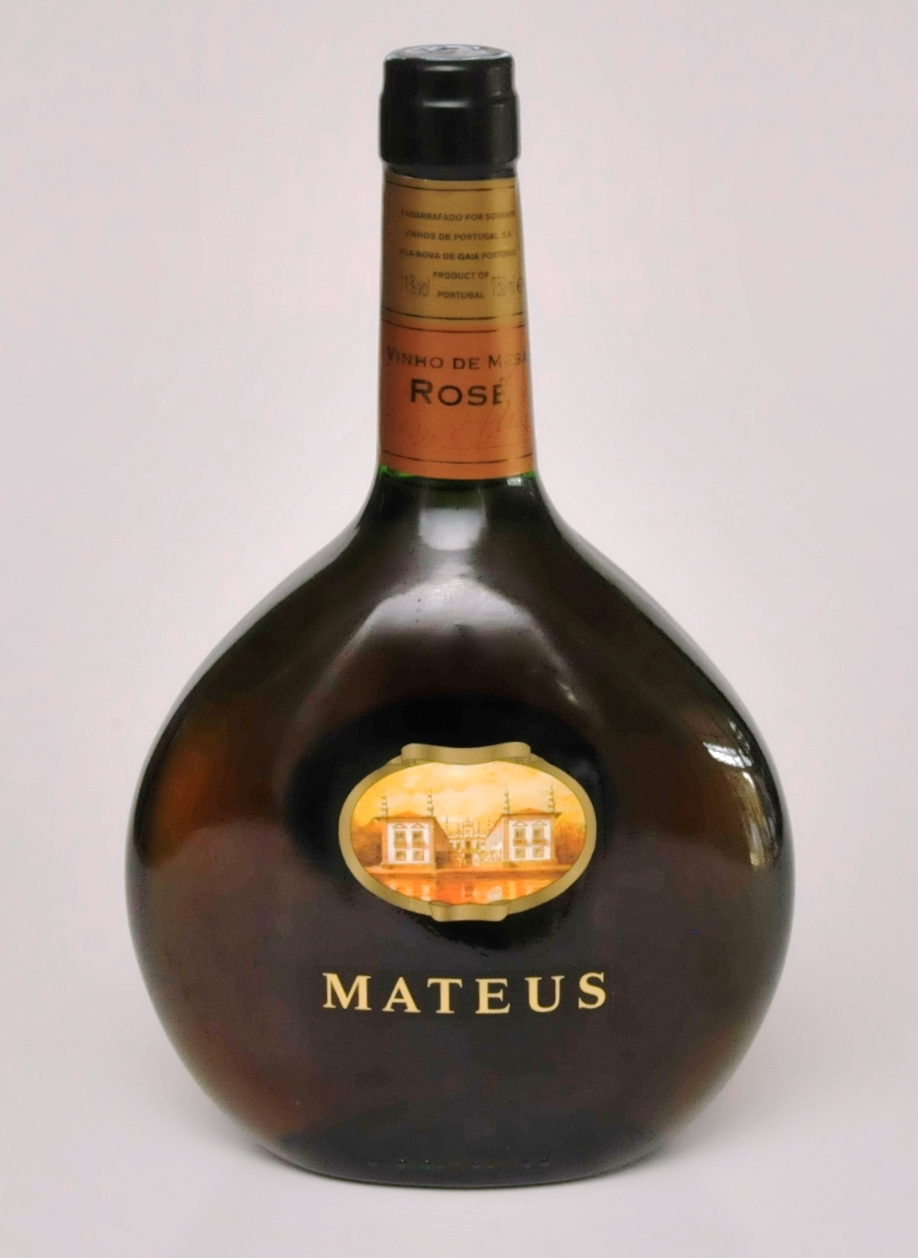
A bottle of Mateus Rosé, 2013

The Count of Mangualde supplied some of the grapes used for the new wine, which were produced on his estate at the Mateus Palace, near Vila Real. Guedes thought that a picture of the palace would make an attractive label for his wine and approached the Count for his permission. They agreed on a fee of half a Portuguese escudo for every bottle sold, about 0.0025 of a Euro. Subsequently, the Count had doubts about the agreement, fearing that the wine would not be a success, and agreed to sell the rights for a fixed sum, a decision he must have subsequently regretted as 50 million bottles of the wine were produced in some years.

The wine was initially a great success in Brazil, the first consignment having been sent in 1943, but the country later banned wine imports. Guedes then sought to develop a market in the rest of the world, sending two bottles to every Portuguese embassy and to friends and acquaintances abroad, asking them to drink one bottle and send the other to someone they though would make a good agent for the wine in their country. Sales boomed, in part because the drinkers found that the bottles could be used for decoration, such as for lamps or candle holders, and in part because of the marketing skills and infectious personality of Guedes. In 1961, Mateus sponsored a horse race at the Ascot Races in England, with Guedes presenting the prize. The races were attended by Queen Elizabeth II, who reportedly later asked for the wine to be served at an event at the Savoy Hotel in London. Many celebrities were photographed consuming it and it is also mentioned in the lyrics of a song by Elton John.

== Death ==
Guedes died in Porto on 15 July 1987. His eldest son, Fernando da Cunha Guedes bought the shares of Sogrape from his six brothers. He died in 2018, and the company is now in the hands of his children.
