= Thomas Black (minister) =

Scottish minister (c. 1670–1739)

Thomas Black (c. 1670–1739) was a Church of Scotland minister who served as Moderator of the General Assembly in 1721.

== Life ==
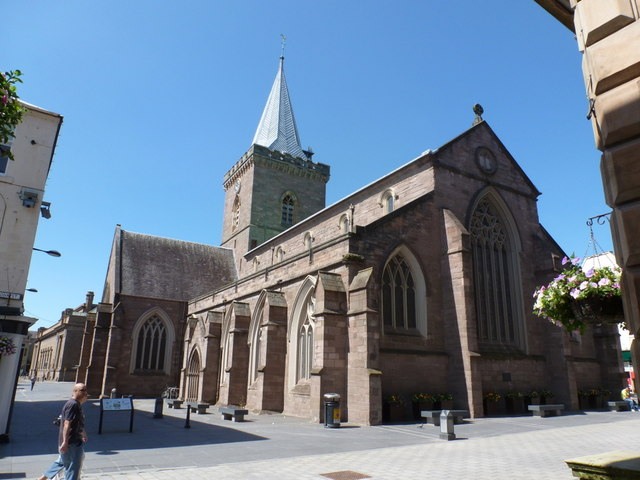
St John's Church in central Perth

Black studied at Glasgow University but there is no record of his graduating. He was licensed to preach by the Presbytery of Cupar in Fife in July 1695.

In September 1695, he was ordained as minister of Strathmiglo Parish Church. In October 1697, he translated to Wemyss Parish Church. In April 1698, he moved to "second charge" of St John's Church in Perth originally under Rev Adam Barclay and from 1691 under Rev Robert Anderson. Black became first charge in 1704 or 1705, remaining in this role until death.

In 1707, Queen Anne appointed him the additional role as Professor of Divinity at St Andrews University.

In 1721, he succeeded William Hamilton as Moderator of the General Assembly of the Church of Scotland the highest position in the Scottish church.

He died in Perth on 25 October 1739. His position in St John's Church was filled by Henry Lindsay.

== Family ==
He married Jean Drummond (d.1750) daughter of James Drummond of Comrie. Their children included:

- Thomas (b.1716)
- Rev David Black (1707-1771), assisted his father (and his successors) from 1737 minister of St John's from 1756 to 1771
- Jean
- Katherine Black, married Rev John Glas of Tealing, founder of the Glasite Church

== Publications ==
- A Meditation or Soliloquoy on the Soul (1743)
- Editor of Halyburton's Sermons (1722)
