= Glassite =

Glassite may refer to:

- A fictional transparent material akin to glass
- Alternative spelling of the Glasite religious movement
