= David Sandeman =

David George Sandeman
- Born: 28 June 1757; Perth, Scotland
- Died: 1835 (aged 77–78)
- Title: Sandemans Port (founder)
- Spouse(s): Hannah Sandeman (first wife); Margaret Fraser (second wife)
- Children: Margaret Chisholm Sandeman; David Chisholm Sandeman
- Parents: George Sandeman (father); Jean Duncan of Seaside (mother)

David George Sandeman FRSE (1757–1835) was an 18th/19th century Scottish merchant who was a founder of Sandemans Port and one of the co-founders of the Commercial Bank of Scotland. His family were all Glasites, an independent Christian sect, founded by one of their ancestors and sometimes called Sandemanians.

== Life ==
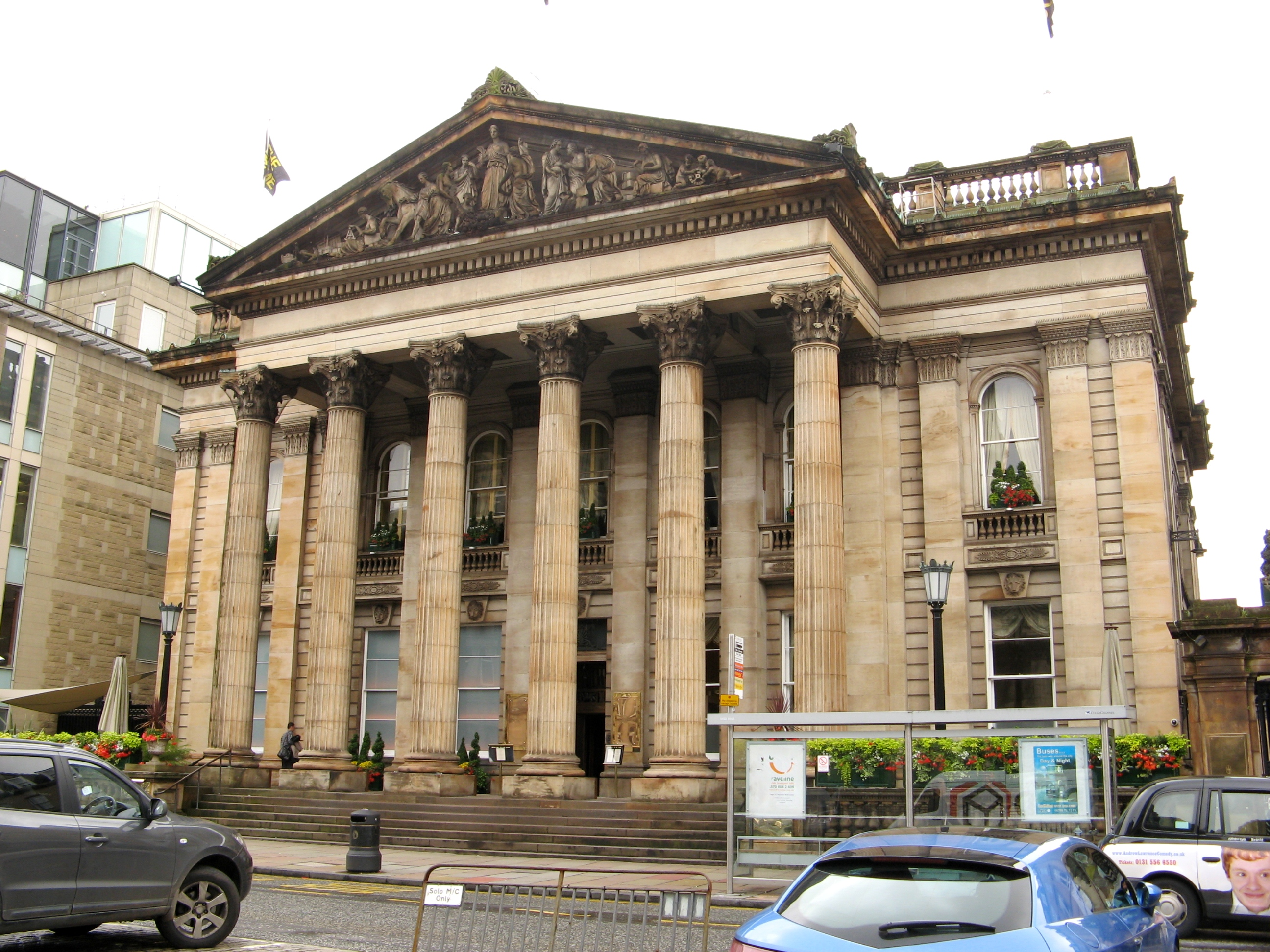
The Commercial Bank, George Street, Edinburgh

He was born on 28 June 1757 in Perth, Scotland the son of George Sandeman of Springland (1724–1803) and his wife, Jean Duncan of Seaside. His younger brother was George Sandeman (1765–1841). In 1790/91 they jointly founded the company of Sandeman's Port.

In 1798 David left the company to found the Commercial Bank of Scotland. Between 1805 and 1810 he moved to Edinburgh setting up David George Sandeman & Co at 11 Forth Street in the eastern New Town. In 1810 he founded the Commercial Bank of Scotland, originally housed at 22 Picardy Place at the head of Leith Walk. In 1835, shortly before his death, he was elected a Fellow of the Royal Society of Edinburgh. His proposer was James L'Amy. He died at 4 Melville Street in the West End of Edinburgh on 24 May 1835.

== Family ==
He married twice, firstly to Hannah Sandeman (1765–1794) who is presumed to be his cousin. In 1797 he married Margaret Fraser of Dumballoch in Perth. Their daughter Margaret Chisholm Sandeman (b.1802) died in Rome. Their son was David Chisholm Sandeman (1806–1852).
