= Charles Wilson Vincent =

British chemist

- Born: 11 May 1837; Islington, London, England
- Died: 11 September 1905 (aged 68); Stoke Newington, England
- Spouses: Ann Baxter; Florence Annie Barratt
- Children: 9 sons and 8 daughters (with Ann); 1 daughter (with Florence)
- Scientific career
- Fields: Chemistry

Charles Wilson Vincent FRSE FIC FCS (1837–1905) was a 19th-century British chemist, and was also librarian at both the Royal Institution and the Reform Club in London. He was a Sandemanian.

== Life ==
He was born in Islington in London on 11 May 1837 the eldest of 12 children of Benjamin Vincent (1818–1899), a colleague of Michael Faraday, and his wife Janey Young. He was baptised in Clerkenwell on 16 June. Benjamin became a Sandemanian at the influence of Faraday in 1832.

He joined the Royal Institution in 1851 as Assistant Librarian, under his father as Librarian. Aged 14 his role presumably was that of a trainee or apprentice. A second son Robert Vincent also joined as second assistant. Charles began lecturing at the Royal College of Chemistry in 1854 (aged only 17).

He resigned as Librarian of the Royal Institution in 1857 to join the chemical industry.

He became a member of the Sandemanian Church in 1859 but resigned in 1864.

In 1875 he was elected a Fellow of the Royal Society of Edinburgh for his contributions to chemistry. His proposers were Andrew Pritchard, William Rutherford, George James Allman and John Hutton Balfour.

He became librarian to the Reform Club in 1879, replacing Henry Campkin.

=== Private life ===
Charles William Vincent married Ann Baxter at Islington Register Office on 15 July 1864 They had 17 children: 9 sons and 8 daughters, ten of whom lived to adulthood The youngest was born when her mother was 47. Ann Vincent died four years later in Edmonton on 5 November 1897.

On 25 August 1900 Vincent married Florence Annie Barratt at St John the Evangelist, Finsbury Park. They had one child, Kathleen Phyllis Vincent, born in 1902. She died in 1971.

Charles died on 11 September 1905 in Stoke Newington.

== Publications ==
- On the Sulphur Deposits of Krýsuvík, Iceland (1873)
- The Yearbook of Facts in Science and Art (from 1855 to 1876)
- Burton Brewing Water (1878)
- Chemistry: Theoretical, Practical and Analytical (1879)
