= Sogrape =

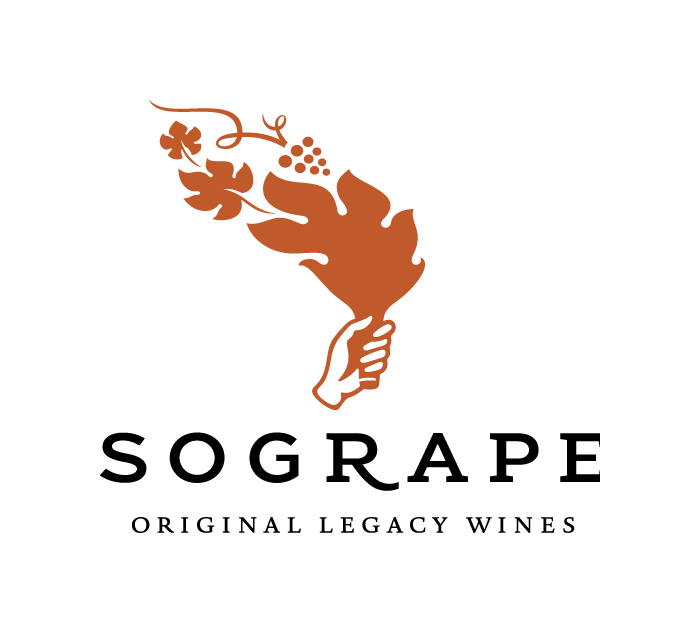
- Headquarters: Portugal
- Brands: Mateus; Legado; Casa Ferreirinha; Porto Ferreira; Sandeman; Quinta dos Carvalhais; Herdade do Peso; Morgadio da Torre; Quinta da Romeira; Bodegas LAN y Viña Mayor; Finca Flichman; Château Los Boldos; Framingham
- Website: sogrape.com

Sogrape is a group of companies and brands founded in 1942 by Fernando Van Zeller Guedes. It owns the brand Mateus, mostly known for its rosé variety, and the brand Sandeman. The company produces wines in Portugal (Sogrape Vinhos Portugal), Spain (Bodegas LAN y Viña Mayor), Argentina (Finca Flichman), Chile (Viña Los Boldos), and New Zealand (Framingham). With distribution companies in Europe, America, Africa, and Asia, its wines are currently sold in about 120 countries.
