= Luncarty =

Coordinates: 56.451644°N 3.469857°W

Luncarty: Scottish Gaelic: Longartaidh
- Location within Perth and Kinross
- Population: 1,630 (2020)
- OS grid reference: NO095298
- Council area: Perth and Kinross
- Lieutenancy area: Perth and Kinross
- Country: Scotland
- Sovereign state: United Kingdom
- Post town: PERTH
- Postcode district: PH1
- Dialling code: 01738
- Police: Scotland
- Fire: Scottish
- Ambulance: Scottish
- UK Parliament: Angus and Perthshire Glens
- Scottish Parliament: Perthshire North

Luncarty (pronounced Lung-cur-tay [ˈlʌŋkəɾte]) is a village in Perth and Kinross, Scotland, approximately 4 miles (6 kilometres) north of Perth. It lies between the A9 to the west, and the River Tay to the east.

== Etymology ==
The name Luncarty, recorded in 1250 as Lumphortyn, may be of Gaelic origin. The name may involve the element longartaibh, a plural form of longphort meaning variously "harbour, palace, encampment".

== History ==
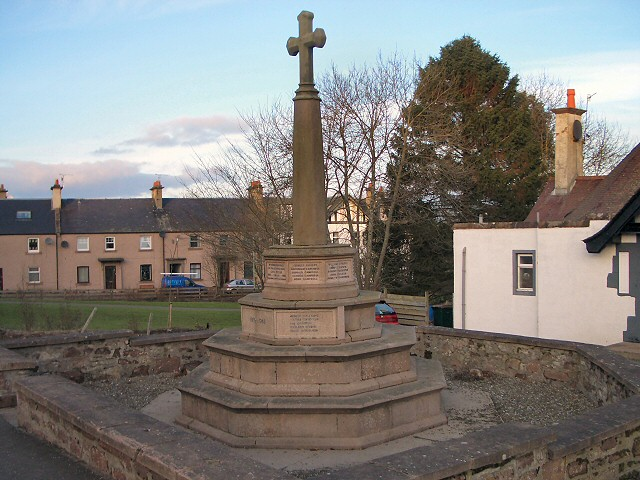
War memorial at Luncarty

The historian Hector Boece (1465–1536), in his History of the Scottish People, records that, in 990, Kenneth III of Scotland defeated the Danes near Luncarty. However, the Scottish historian John Hill Burton strongly suspected the battle of Luncarty to be an invention of Hector Boece. Burton was incorrect. Walter Bower, writing in his Scotichronicon around 1440, some 87 years before Boece first published his Scotorum Historia, refers to the battle briefly as follows:

"that remarkable battle of Luncarty, in which the Norsemen with their king were totally destroyed". Bower does not quote specific sources concerning the battle, but, two sentences later, he refers in a general way to ancient writings that he has consulted. The term Norsemen would include Danes.

The present village was founded in 1752 by William Sandeman, to house workers at his bleachfields. The village formerly had a railway station, which closed in 1951, but the Perth to Inverness railway line still runs through the village.

A rare example of a morthouse is located in the churchyard, built to frustrate the activities of bodysnatchers in the 19th century.

== Bleachfields ==
William Sandeman and his partner Hector Turnbull manufactured linen in Perth and bleached it in Luncarty, for instance with an order of 12,000 to 15,000 yards (11,000 to 14,000 metres) of "Soldiers' shirting". In 1752 he leveled 12 acres (5 hectares) of land in Luncarty to form bleachfields. By 1790 when William died, the Luncarty bleachfields covered 80 acres (32 hectares) and processed 500,000 yards (460,000 metres) of cloth annually. Second only to agriculture, linen manufacture was a major Scottish industry in the late 18th century — linen then became less important with the introduction of cotton.

== Sport ==
The village is home to the football club Luncarty F.C., who play in the East of Scotland League Second Division.

== Notable persons ==
- Christopher Bowes, musician
- Jimmy Guthrie, footballer
- Jim Patterson, footballer
- George Turnbull, civil engineer
