= William Sandeman =

Scottish business owner (1722 – 1790)

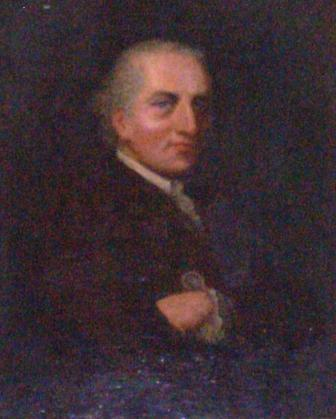
William Sandeman 1722-1790

William Sandeman (1722 in Luncarty, Scotland – 1790 in Perth, Scotland) was a leading Perthshire linen and later cotton manufacturer. For instance in 1782 alone, Perthshire produced 1.7 million yards of linen worth £81,000. Linen manufacture became by the 1760s a major Scottish industry, second only to agriculture.

William was born in 1722 in Luncarty just north of Perth, Scotland the fifth child of David Sandeman and his second wife Margaret Ramsay. William with his first wife Christina Fleming had two children. With his second wife Mary Anderson he had a further 14 children (five of whom married five of the 20 children of Hector Turnbull, his bleachfield's business partner). In 1740, Robert and William Sandeman started a weaving business together, though Robert's expanding church duties in Dundee and Edinburgh removed him from the family business. William was exposed to the Glasite faith after the Perth meeting house first opened in 1733. He was later elected an elder of the Perth congregation for several years. In this position, he was expected to lead the congregation in both the worship and community service. As part of his Glasite obligations, he journeyed with his brother Robert in the first attempt to form a London Sandemanian congregation in 1761. When Robert extracted himself from the family business, William found another willing partner in Hector Turnbull. He was buried in the Greyfriars graveyard Perth with the inscription "William Sandeman manufacturer Perth and bleacher at Luncarty".

== Linen manufacture and spinning around Perth ==
He manufactured linen in Perth and nearby Luncarty, for instance with an order of 12,000 to 15,000 yards of "Soldiers' shirting". In 1752 he leveled 12 acres (49,000 m^{2}) of bleachfields in Luncarty. By 1790 when William died, the Luncarty bleachfields covered 80 acres (320,000 m^{2}) and processed 500,000 yards of cloth annually.

== Linen spinning in the north of Scotland ==
In the early 1760s, William Sandeman opened two further linen centres: Milntown (now Milton) in Easter Ross and Fortrose on the Black Isle near Inverness. By 1765, these had almost 1000 spinners.

== Cotton spinning ==
By the 1780s, cotton was replacing linen. In November 1784, Sandeman visited Lancashire cotton mills and Richard Arkwright the inventor who had pioneered cotton-spinning machinery in Derbyshire. Sandeman, Arkwright and others established the Tay River–powered cotton mill in Stanley (just north of Luncarty, Perthshire) in 1786/7 with 3200 spindles.
