= Mateus Palace =

Coordinates: 41°17′49″N 7°42′45″W

- Palácio de Mateus
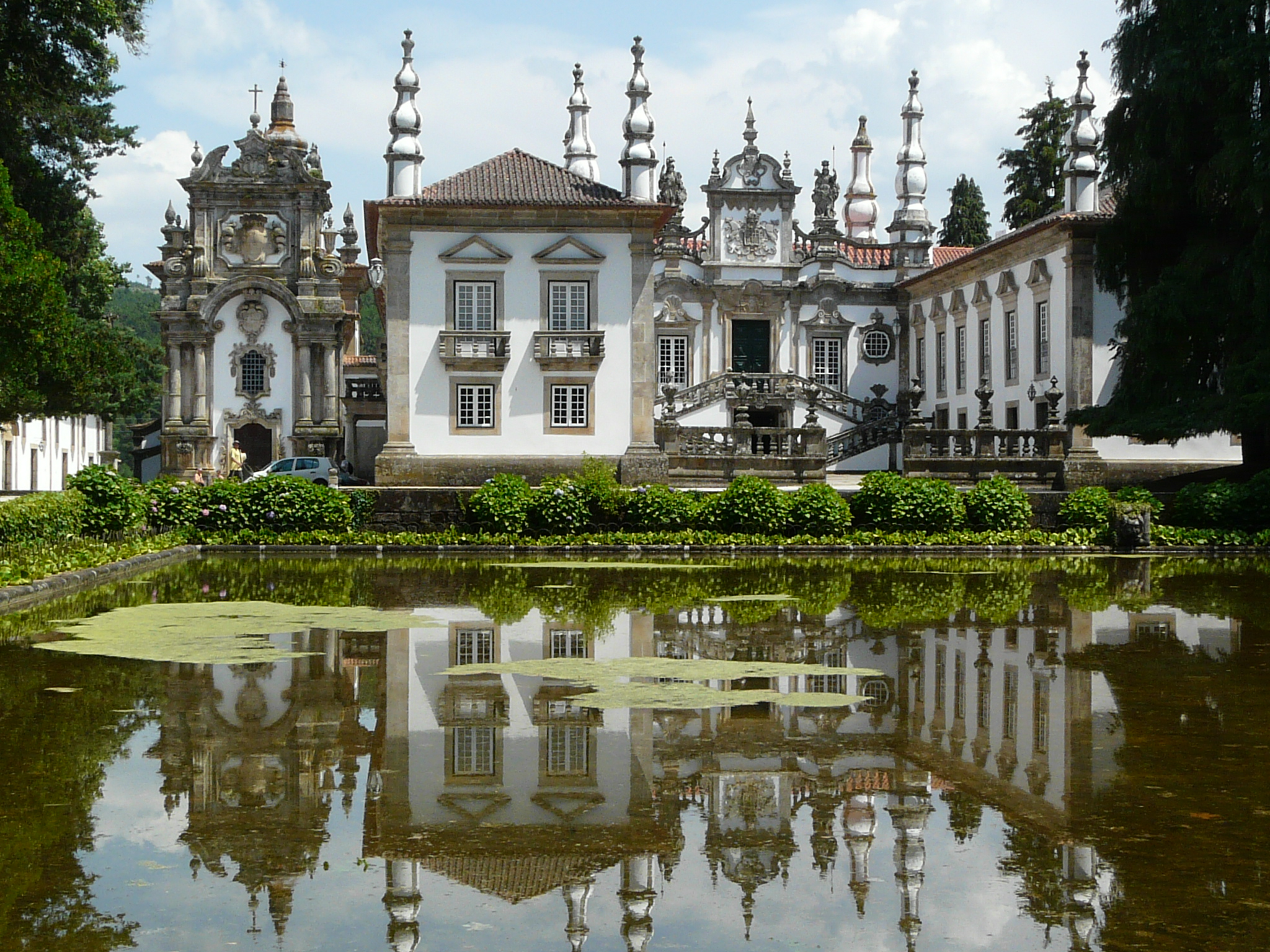
- Interactive map of the Mateus Palace area

General information
- Type: House
- Architectural style: Portuguese Northern Baroque
- Location: Vila Real, Portugal
- Construction started: 1739
- Completed: 1743
- Governing body: Private

Design and construction
- Architect: Nicolau Nasoni

The Mateus Palace (Portuguese: Palácio de Mateus, Solar de Mateus or Casa de Mateus) is a palace located in the civil parish of Mateus, municipality of Vila Real, Portugal. The three primary buildings are the manor, the winery and the chapel.

The winery buildings date from the 16th century and were modified in the 1800s. Architect Nicolau Nasoni was involved in the project for the construction of the palace, which took place in the 18th century, possibly between 1739 and 1743, according to one expert. The work was authorized by António José Botelho Mourão, 3rd Morgado of Mateus. The current manor replaced the former family house which was built in the same location in the early 1600s. In 1910, it was classified as a National Monument. The palace is owned by the Mateus Foundation.

It gives the name to the Mateus rosé wine brand.

== The manor house ==
The palace is constructed following a rectangular plan open to the west, blocked by a building which demarcates a main courtyard and behind a private quadrangle.
Between the doorway and the courtyard, an ornamental pond, surrounded by trees, serves as a mirror.
The courtyard, opened like a U, is closed off by a balustrade.
Between the wings, the courtyard is closed by a transversing decorated structure of an emblazoned pediment, encircled by two statue guards in baroque style.

Its interior decoration includes some intricately carved chestnut wood ceilings, furniture from several periods, 17th and 18th century paintings and a library with many books.

== The garden ==
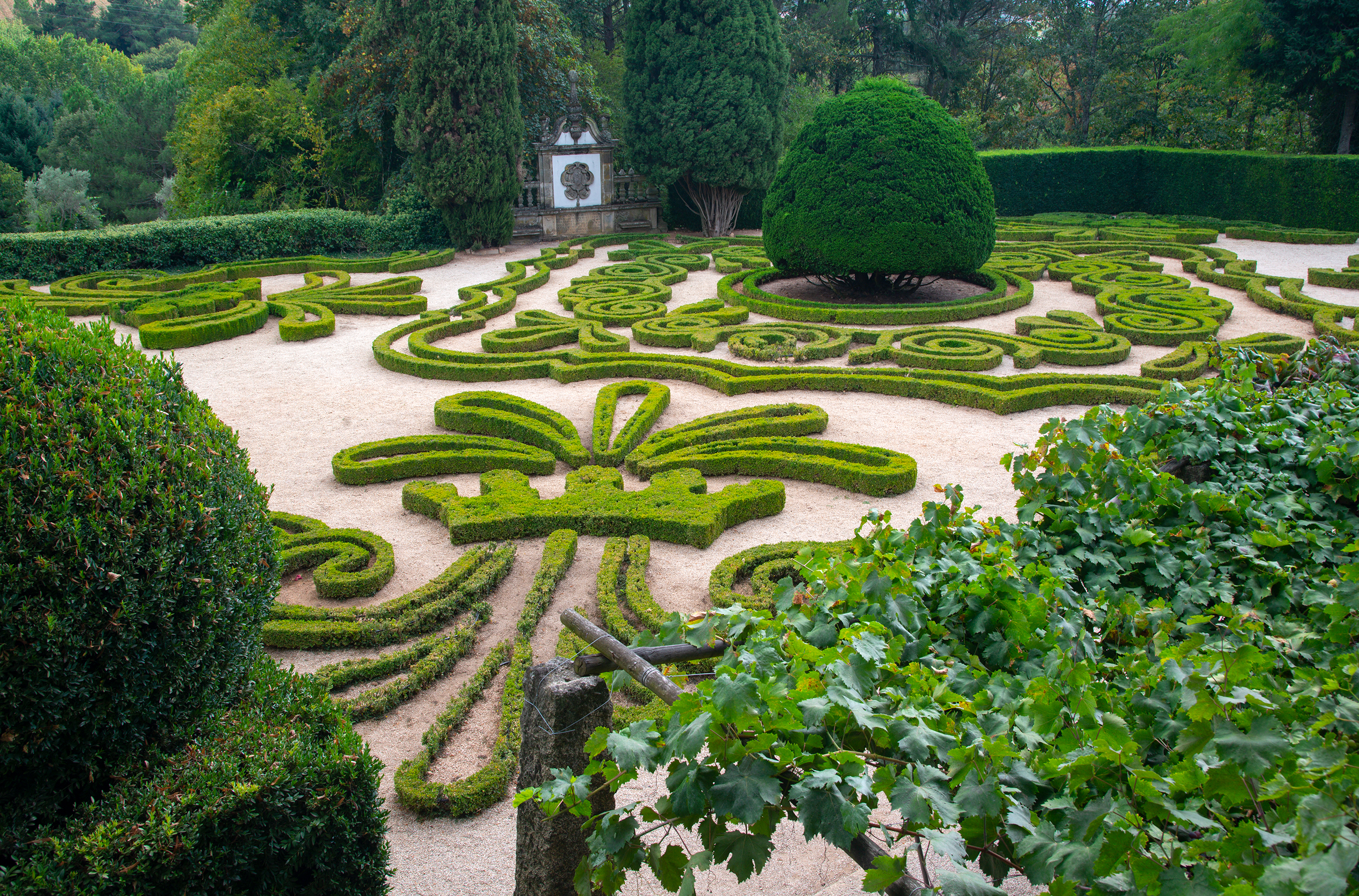
Part of the Garden, Casa de Mateus, September 2019

Parts of the garden had been planted in the 1700s, modified in 1870 and expanded in 1930. In the 1950s and 1960s, the garden area was extensively modified and the lake was added to act as a mirror reflecting the manor house. A dense planting of chestnut and oak trees was added in the 1970s. The sculpture of a woman "sleeping" in the water was created by João Cutileiro and installed in 1981.

== Gallery ==
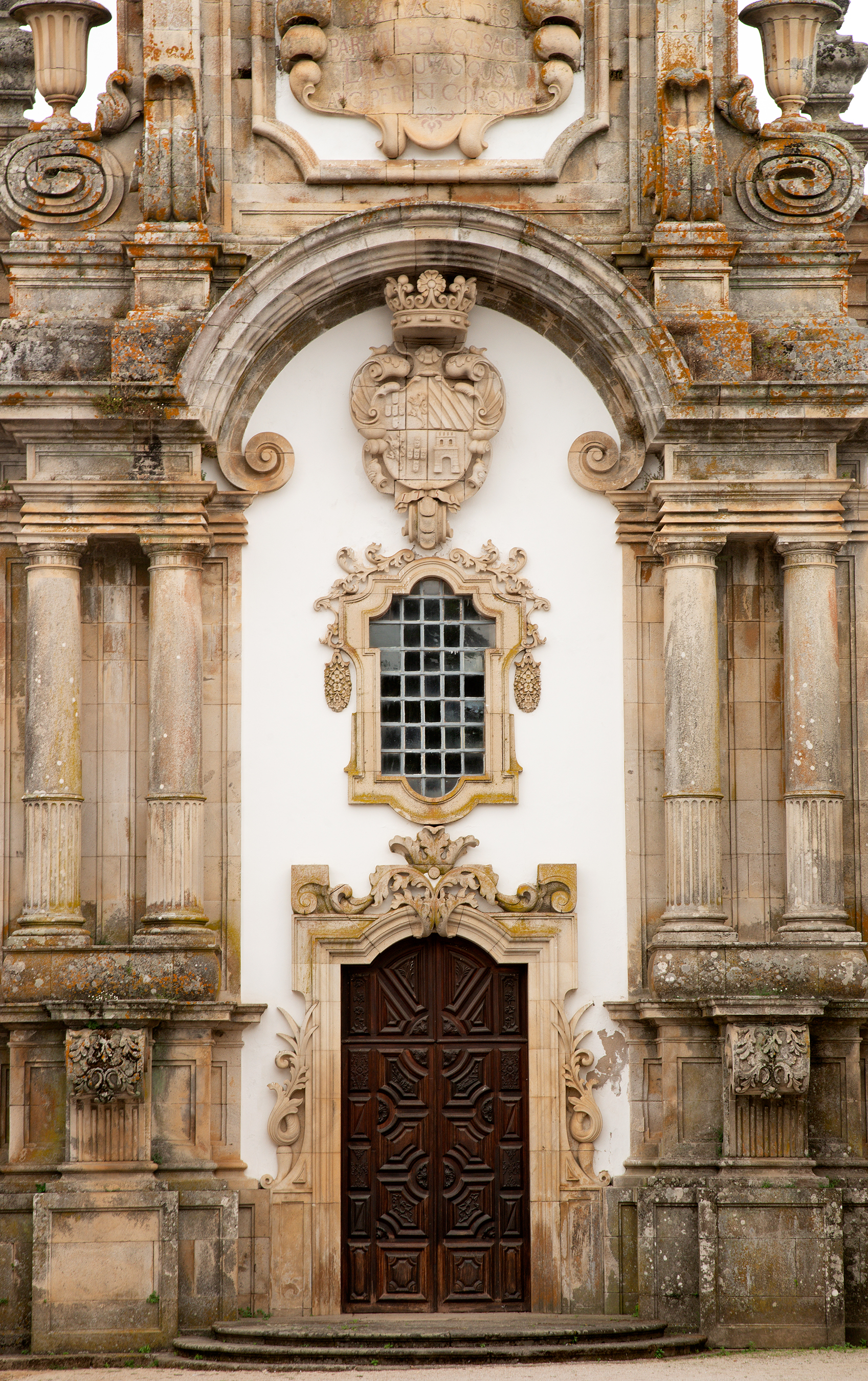
Chapel exterior

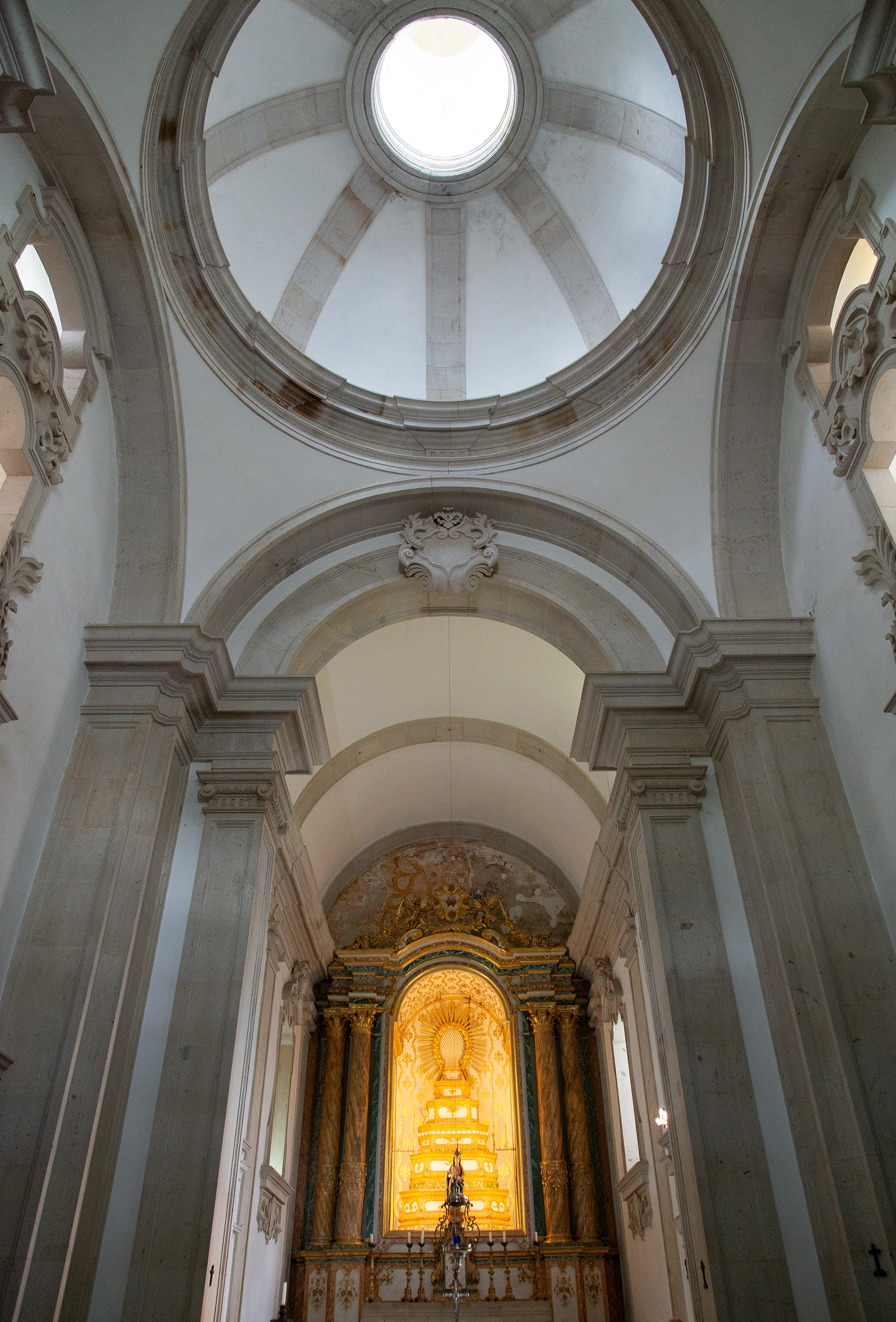
Chapel interior

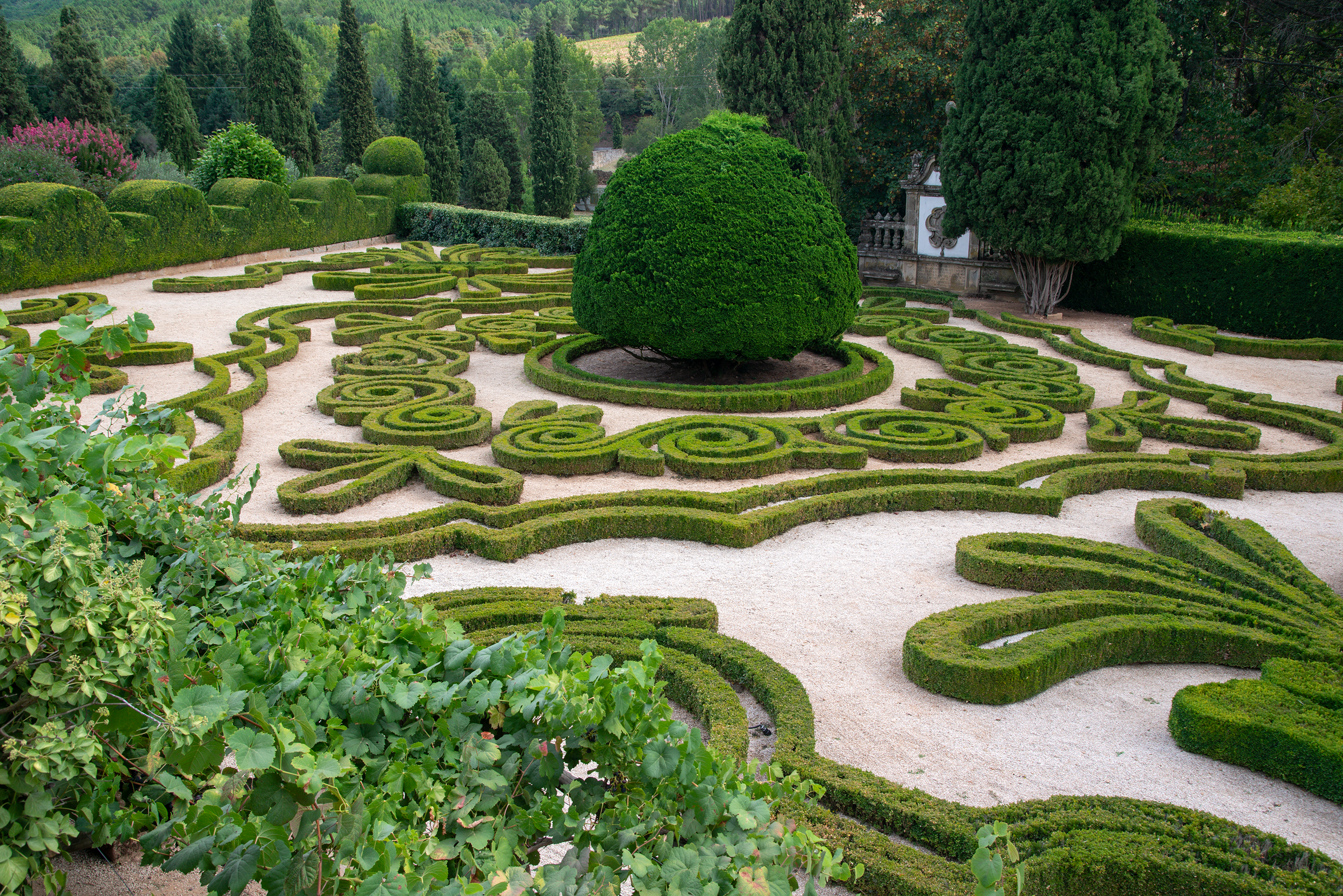
Part of the Garden, September 2019

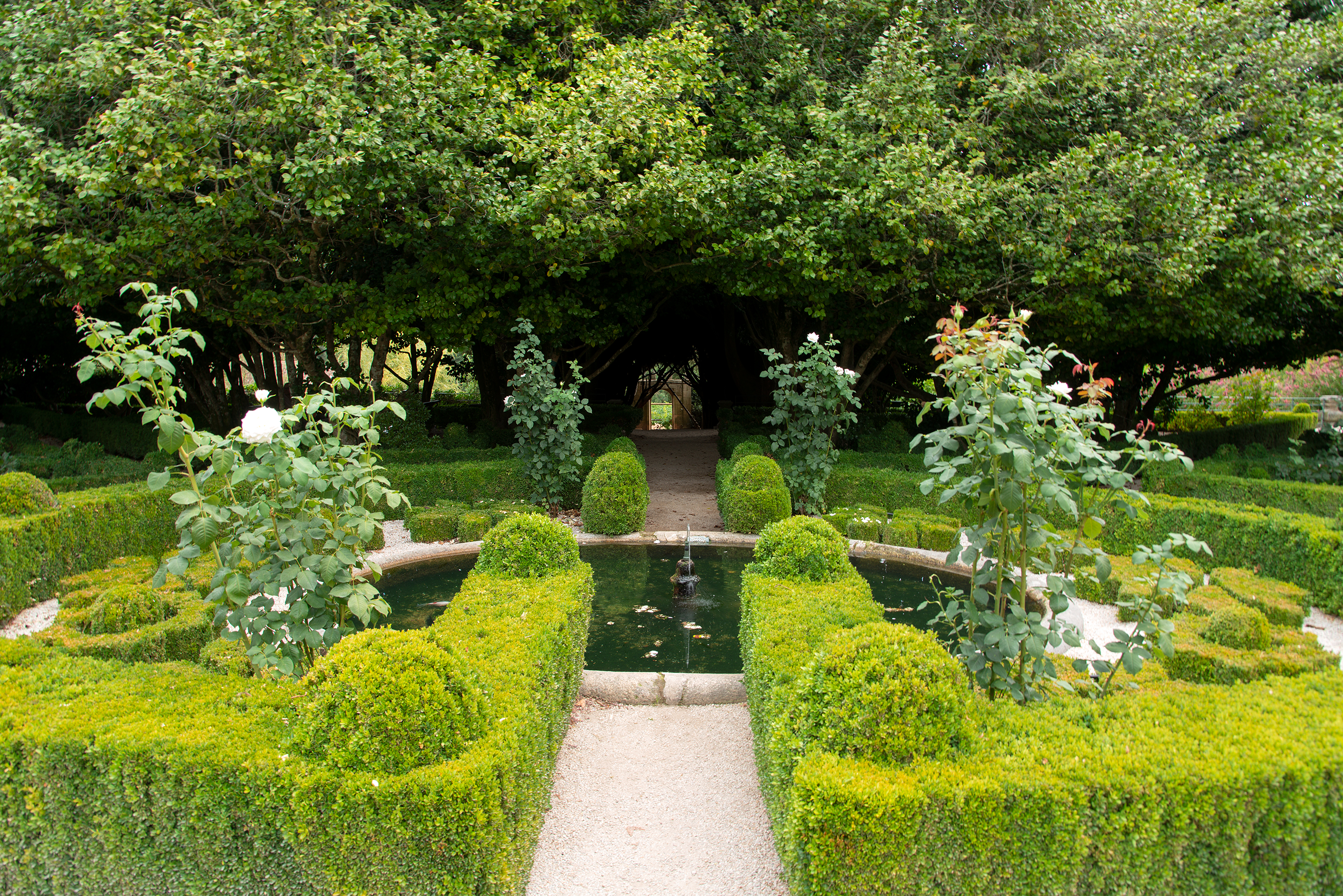
A section of the symmetrical area of the garden

== See also ==
- List of Baroque residences
