= Mateus (wine) =

Portuguese brand of wine

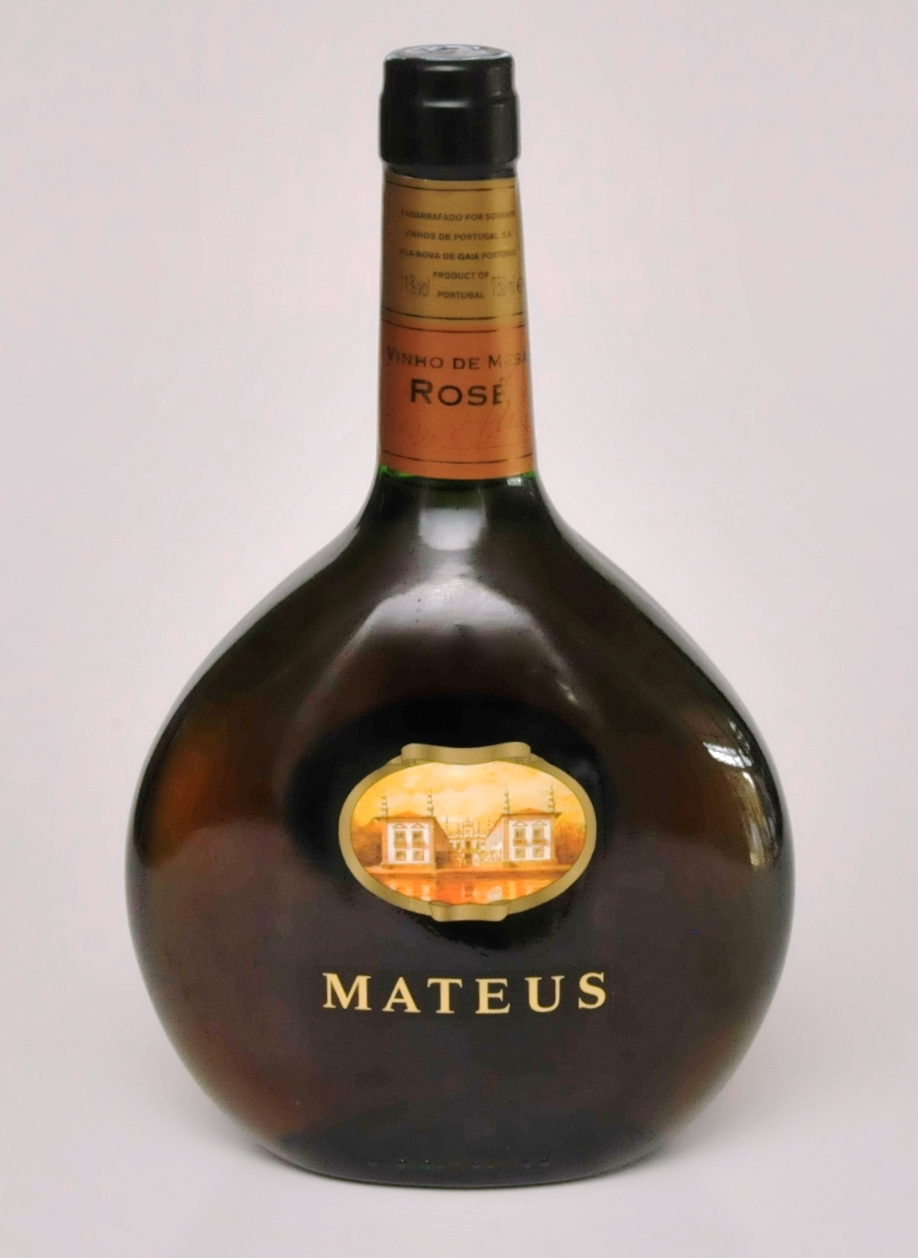
- A bottle of Mateus (2013)
- Origin: Portugal
- Introduced: 1942
- Colour: Red
- Flavour: Medium-sweet
- Website: mateusrose.us

Mateus was a brand of medium-sweet frizzante rosé wine produced in Portugal.

== History ==
The Mateus Rose brand was launched in 1942 and introduced to the UK in the early 1950s. Production began at the end of World War II. The wine was especially styled to appeal to the rapidly developing North American and northern European markets.

An early admirer was Sacheverell Sitwell:

Among the delights of Portugal are the unfamiliar wines upon the wine lists... there is one wine that is altogether exceptional, and that comes from the remote northern Province of Trás-os-Montes. This is the most delicious vin rosé that I have ever tasted. It is called Mateus, and it may be that the view of the lovely villa of that name, near Vila Real, which is upon the label, makes the wine taste even better. For the villa has a façade of granite and white stucco, with many urns and statues. But what is unique in this wine is that it is the colour of orangeade, and slightly pétillant. Let no one despise it for its colour! Mateus is delicious beyond words; and since I am told that it will travel and is exported to Brazil, it is a pity that one cannot buy it here in England.

Production grew rapidly in the 1950s and 1960s, and by the late 1970s, supplemented with a white version, it accounted for almost 40% of Portugal's total export of table wine. At that time, worldwide sales were 3.25 million cases per year.

Roger Scruton recorded the social impact which the wine had in England:

My two sisters and I were raised in the shelter of penury and puritanical restraint. And maybe we would have retained the meek decencies of our childhood, had it not been for the great transformation that our generation underwent when the Portuguese brand called Mateus Rosé burst on the scene, along with other breaches of English decorum around 1963...

At some point in the 2010s, the original Mateus semi-sweet frizzante rosé was discontinued, and reformulated as a still dry wine.

== Producer ==
Sogrape, Portugal's largest winemaker and the brand's owner, has diversified as the Mateus brand lost favour with consumers. In the UK in 2002 the wine was re-packaged and relaunched to capitalise on 1970s nostalgia, with the wine being less sweet and more sparkling as drinkers preferred a drier wine. Its flask-shaped bottle, with unique "baroque historic mansion" label (Mateus Palace in Vila Real, Portugal) and cork stopper were retained, although a screw top version was offered in Northern Europe.

== Varieties ==
As Mateus rose' sales exploded in the 70's, producer Sogrape introduced Mateus White, then Casal Garcia vino verde, both in the traditional Mateus shape bottle. In 2005, "Mateus Rosé Tempranillo", produced in Spain, was launched aimed at younger wine drinkers, particularly women. In 2014, the company launched its "Expressions" range of three rosé wines and one white wine. The Expressions range comprises three rosé wines – Baga and Shiraz, Baga and Muscat and Aragonez and Zinfandel – and one white wine – a Maria Gomes and Chardonnay blend.

== Cultural significance ==
- Mateus rosé was among the alcoholic beverages which were stockpiled in the cellars of Saddam Hussein's palaces.
- It was a preferred wine of Queen Elizabeth II (in 1999).
- The wine is mentioned in the lyrics of the Elton John song, Social Disease (1973): "I get juiced on Mateus and just hang loose."
- A bottle of Mateus can be seen in the cover photograph of Graham Nash's 1973 album Wild Tales, positioned on the mantelpiece just behind Nash's head.
- A standard decoration in Beat Generation coffeehouses was an empty Mateus bottle with a colourful candle dripping wax down the sides.
- In Mike Sager's May 1989 Los Angeles Times article "The Devil and John Holmes", the late porn star's ex-wife Sharon confides: "On their first date, he'd brought a bottle of Mateus and a handful of flowers. Sharon had watched through the window as he picked them from a neighbor's front yard."
- In the 1978 film, Animal House, at the home of English professor Professor Dave Jennings (Donald Sutherland), where some "grass" is to be consumed, a Mateus bottle is seen being used as a candle-holder.
- It is shown being served during the Chinese take-away breakfast scene in the 1981 film, Neighbors.
- In 1977, Frontier Airlines featured complimentary Mateus wine as part of its meal service on selected flights and advertised this fact.
- Professional wrestler André the Giant was said to drink six bottles of Mateus wine before a match.
- During the Cold War period, Mateus wine became one of the most drunk wines of the American army. Its soldiers are told to be one of the main evangelists of Mateus in markets in the Far East, as in Vietnam.
- In an episode of the sketch comedy TV series Kids in the Hall, Mateus is used to toast a recently concluded business transaction between an artist and collector who are implied to have poor taste in art.
- According to Amy Wallace, his former partner, Mateus served Carlos Castaneda as an inspiration for naming his invented teacher, Don Juan Matus.

== See also ==
- Lancers (wine)
