= Robert Sandeman (theologian) =

British theologian

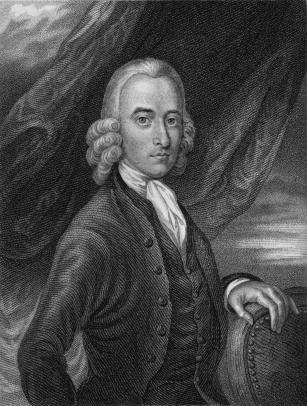
- A portrait of Sandeman
- Born: 29 April 1718; Perth, Scotland
- Died: 2 April 1771 (aged 52); Danbury, Connecticut
- Education: Edinburgh University
- Occupation: Theologian
- Known for: Founding Sandemanianism in England and America
- Notable work: Letters on Theron and Aspasio
- Spouse: Catherine
- Parent(s): David Sandeman & Margaret Ramsey
- Relatives: William Sandeman

Robert Sandeman (29 April 1718, in Perth – 2 April 1771, in Danbury, Connecticut) was a Scottish nonconformist theologian. He was closely associated with the Glasite church which he helped to promote. His importance was such that Glasite churches outside Scotland were known as Sandemanian.

== Biography ==
=== Early life and religious development ===
He was born the second of twelve children to a linen weaver, David Sandeman and his wife Margaret Ramsay. He attended Edinburgh University over a two-year period beginning in 1734, where he initially seemed destined for a career in either medicine or the established church. It was here, however, where he encountered the teachings of John Glas, and joined his Dundee congregation in 1735. It was during this period that he apprenticed as a linen weaver for a number of years before starting a family business with his brother William. In 1737 he married Glas' daughter Catherine. They did not have any children by the time of her death in 1746. At the age of 26 he was selected as an elder of the Glasite church in Perth.

Following his wife's death, Sandeman devoted his life to his church and scripture. He traveled between Perth, Dundee, and Edinburgh where he served as elder among these Glasite congregations. He was more forceful than Glas and also more controversial. It was he who was largely responsible for spreading the church's doctrines both within Scotland and elsewhere. As a result of this, outside Scotland the Glasite denomination was known as Sandemanian, reflecting his importance.

=== Growing influence ===
In 1757 he came to wider attention by publishing Letters on Theron and Aspasio, in which he attacked the theology of James Hervey (whose Theron and Aspasio had been published in 1755.) In particular Sandeman disagreed with Hervey's idea of imputed righteousness but also put forward the intellectualist perception of religion he shared with Glas and his view that faith was the beginning of a correspondence, leading to full assurance of hope.

His work was widely read, and influenced a great many independent clergy throughout England. Because of his easy-believism, the Letters drew heated responses from theologians such as John Wesley and John Brine who were more closely aligned with Hervey's views. In the years that followed, Samuel Pike, William Cudworth (1717-1763?), John Barnard (1725-1804? Islington), and Benjamin Ingham, all entered into correspondence with him to help them in their ministries. The first three confessed their faith and were admitted into the London congregation, while the latter reorganized his Inghamite churches along the lines set out by Glasites. Ingham was elected elder in his Tadcaster congregation in 1762. John Barnard's correspondence led to Sandeman's London visit and the establishment of the first Glasite, or outside Scotland, Sandemanian congregation in London at Glover's Hall, Beech Lane, Barbican, 23 March 1762. Cudworth, Barnard, and James Allen, a convert from Ingham, were instrumental to Sandeman and Glas in the establishment of Sandemanian congregations throughout England and Wales.

Sandeman caused a controversy over soteriology over the definition of true faith, Sandeman's views are paraller to some modern Free Grace theologians.

=== Church planting in America ===
Sandeman founded one of the first Churches of Christ in America in Portsmouth, New Hampshire on May 4, 1765. In 1760, Letters was published in New England which led to a 1763 invitation to Danbury, Connecticut, to advise on church formation. James Cargill (a glover from Dundee, Scotland) sailed with him aboard the George and James to Boston. Sandeman engaged in some fairly successful discussions while there, founding some churches despite the opposition of orthodox congregationalists. Around this same time, Sandeman's friend, Ebenezer White established a Church of Christ in Danbury, Connecticut. These efforts resulted in approximately eight congregations being planted in New England and one other in Canada. The congregations emphasized a reliance on Scriptures to find church doctrine, weekly communion, biblical church names such as "Church of Christ," the oversight of elders and congregational autonomy. The congregations associated with Sandeman had trouble being sustained, likely because of his loyalty to Britain in the years leading up to the American War of Independence. However, similar church efforts in New England would be revived around the turn of the century, although independently of Sandeman's influence, by others such as Abner Jones and Elias Smith.

== Family ==
His father, David Sandeman, was a City Magistrate in Perth from 1735 to 1763. William Sandeman, his brother, developed linen bleachfields in Perthshire.

== Bibliography ==
- Cantor, Geoffrey: Michael Faraday, Sandemanian and Scientist: A Study of Science and Religion in the Nineteenth Century, Macmillan (Hampshire, 1991).
- Smith, John Howard: The Perfect Rule of the Christian Religion: A History of Sandemanianism in the Eighteenth Century, SUNY (Albany, NY, 2008).
- Thornton, Thomas Henry: Colonel Sir Robert Sandeman: his life and work on our Indian frontier. (London, 1895).
- Wilson, Walter: The History and Antiquities of Dissenting Churches and Meeting Houses in London, Westminster, and Southwark; Including the Lives of their Ministers, from the Rise of Nonconformity to the Present Time, 4 Volumes. (London, 1810).
- "Sandeman, Robert (1718-1771)" . Dictionary of National Biography. London: Smith, Elder & Co. 1885–1900.
