= Perth Grammar School =

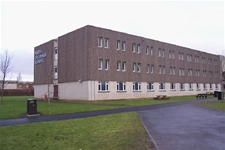

Location
- Gowans Terrace; Perth, PH1 5AZ; Scotland; 56°24′34″N 3°26′47″W

Information
- Type: Secondary, State funded
- Motto: Pride, Respect, Ambition
- Religious affiliation: Non-denominational
- Established: 1971
- Local authority: Perth and Kinross Council
- Rector: Fiona robertson
- Gender: Co-educational
- Age: 11 to 18
- Enrolment: 868
- Houses: Almond; Earn; Lomond
- Colours: Black, gold and silver
- Website: http://www.perthgrammar.org.uk/

Perth Grammar School is a secondary school in Perth, Scotland. It is located in the Muirton district of Perth at the junction of Bute Drive and Gowans Terrace. The catchment serves the area to the north of Perth between Murthly and Methven while a part of its catchment is urban, serving Tulloch, Muirton and North Muirton.

Perth Grammar School is one of a small number of secondary schools in Scotland to have achieved the Schools green flag for the past 4 years.

Perth Grammar School is also a sports comprehensive, in partnership with a neighbouring secondary, St John’s Academy.

== Development ==
While a Grammar School of Perth had been founded in the 12th century, the modern Perth Grammar School was a product of the Scotland-wide move from selective to comprehensive secondary education in the 1960s. Perth and Kinross Education Authority decided in 1967 to create three fully comprehensive schools — Perth Academy, incorporating the existing Academy building and Goodlyburn Secondary; Perth High School, which would move from its site at Gowans Terrace/Bute Drive to a new, purpose-built building in the Oakbank district; and the creation of Perth Grammar School, which would also have its own purpose-built accommodation, but as a temporary measure inhabit the prefabricated buildings vacated by the High School.

Perth Grammar School opened at the start of the new term on Tuesday 24 August 1971 with 280 first year pupils, building up to full six-year status in the 1976/77 school year. By 1977/78 the school roll was 1,314 pupils. The school's first headmaster was Robert Heeps, formerly the headmaster of Goodlyburn Secondary School from 1969.

Perth Grammar's initial accommodation was very poor, consisting of mobile huts, built in 1947 as part of the government's HORSA programme, which had long outlived their projected lifespan of ten years. With only one gymnasium the school often had to use outside facilities such as Bell's Sports Centre. It was hoped a new building could be constructed ahead of the Grammar becoming a full six-year facility in 1976, but a series of political rows and funding difficulties saw the completion date stretched through various building phases.

In March 1972, for instance, the director of education warned that the county's share of government funding for school-building projects would not be sufficient to meet even a reasonable first instalment of a replacement building. The first phase, incorporating around ten new classrooms, including the English department and a large resources centre, was eventually opened at the start of the new term on Monday 16 August 1976, with the administrative heart of the complex following in October.

Phase two of the building programme was given the go-ahead by the newly created Tayside Regional Council in April 1975. It included an open-plan technical department, 13 science laboratories, an open-plan home economics department and a small theatre. It was due to be completed by May 1977.

The third phase incorporated a games hall, gymnasia, and the art and music departments. Costed at £850,000, it was agreed for 1979/80.

In 1983, the rector, Robert Heeps, castigated the regional council for its “complacent attitude” towards the school's accommodation crisis, citing temperatures plunging to the lower 50s in temporary classrooms with pupils huddled in gloves and anoraks. Three years later, his successor, Douglas Bader, admitted that the school campus was not one of the most attractive and that the combination of clay soil, a wet year, and the mess caused on the site by the conversion of part of the school's heating to gas, had caused problems of mud and dirt being carried into the buildings. He added that the unfinished appearance of phase one, two and three block made the school look forward eagerly to a start on the construction of phase four.

The fourth and final stage of the programme was originally approved by Tayside Regional Council in October 1986, but the plans were subsequently delayed and the final approval was not given until May 1990 at a total cost of £3.1 million — £400,000 more than previous estimates. This involved the construction of a three-storey extension at the south end of the school, connected to the existing three-storey block by a corridor, housing social studies, maths, business studies, languages and administration. In addition, a new single-storey block at the north end of the complex was home to the new music and art departments. Work started on 22 April 1991 and was completed in August 1992, three months earlier than expected. The following month, bulldozers moved in to demolish the UNISECO building and the huts were removed. Landscaping work was carried out to create a new car park and sports field. However, these works were delayed as a result of the Perth flooding of January 1993. The extension was officially opened on 22 September 1993 in the year of the school's 21st anniversary.

== Key dates ==
In October 1978 the school launched a 'talking magazine' which was recorded on cassette by senior pupils and distributed among the blind and partially sighted in the Perth and Kinross district. The project started when two teachers at the school were looking for a community service role for pupils and, at the same time, the Perthshire and Kinross-shire Society for the Blind were looking for someone to start such a service. The first pilot cassettes, lasting 30 minutes, were distributed to around 30 listeners.

Following his retirement in February 1985, Robert Heeps was succeeded as rector by Douglas Bader, formerly deputy rector of Montrose Academy, who took up his new post on 3 June 1985.

The school made history at the start of the 1986/87 term when it appointed the first male Home Economics teacher in Scotland: 22 year-old Alastair MacGregor, from Blair Atholl, who had recently graduated from Moray House College, Edinburgh.

Following similar initiatives elsewhere in Scotland, in 1988 a Youth Enquiry Service for Perth was set-up in the school's community wing, run by young people for young people, with youth workers employed for guidance. The service offered information on benefits, housing, holidays, health and sex education, law, money and leisure. The facility moved to Perth city centre in July 1992.

The school's first yearbook was published in April 1992.

The flooding of January 1993 saw the Perth Grammar School Community Wing become a focal point for affected families in the affected North Muirton area, including the provision of emergency shelter for those washed out of their homes.

A senior tie was introduced in the 2002/03 academic year, initially for sixth year pupils but later extended to S4–S6.

In October 2005, a new athletics centre, The George Duncan Arena, was opened within the school grounds, and this is available for public use outwith school hours.

== Head teachers ==
- Robert Heeps, 1971–1985
- Douglas Bader, 1985–2001
- Roddy Renfrew, 2002–2006
- John Low, 2007-2013
- Barry Millar, 2013-2016
- Fiona Robertson, 2016–2026
- Martin Reid, 2026-present

== Notable alumni ==
Sylvia Patterson, Scottish music journalist
