= Glasite =

Christian sect

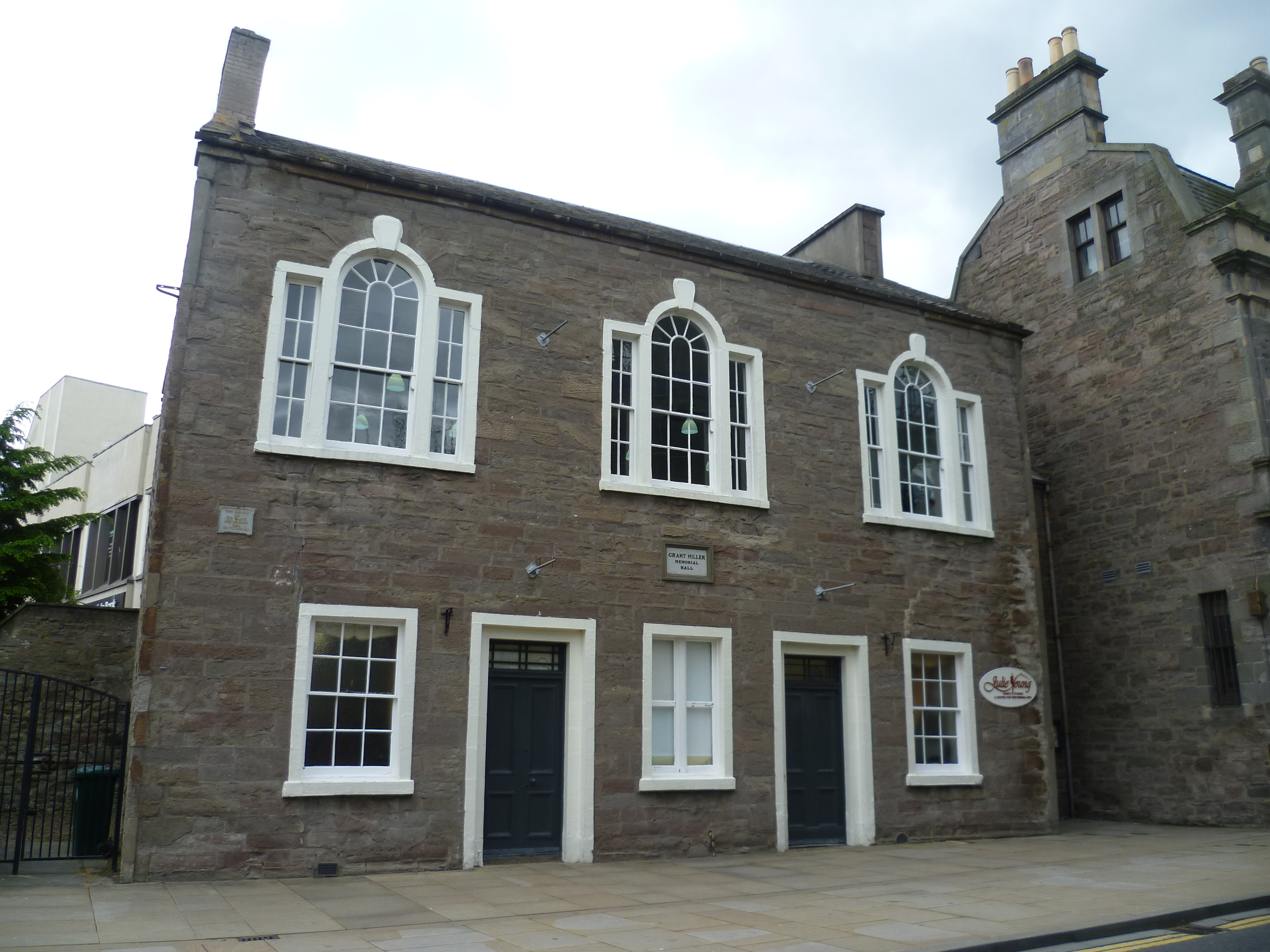
Glasite Meeting House, Perth, Scotland

The Glasites /ˈɡlæsaɪts/ or Glassites were a small Christian church founded in about 1730 in Scotland by John Glas. (Note: John Glas preached supremacy of God's word (Bible) over allegiance to Church and state to his congregation in Tealing near Dundee in July 1725. Glas continued to preach his vision over the next five years. The General Assembly's response to Glas's publication of Testimony of the king of martyrs concerning his kingdom (1727) was to depose him in October 1728. The Church's deposition was enacted on 12 March 1730. See pages 19-21 of Geoffrey Cantor (1991).) Glas' faith, as part of the First Great Awakening, was spread by his son-in-law Robert Sandeman into England and America, where the members were called Sandemanians.

The Glasite sect strictly opposed the existence of state churches, with each congregation consisting of multiple elders. They strictly observed the Lord's supper weekly, practiced foot washing and opposed the accumulation of wealth. Due to the influence of Robert Sandeman, the Glasite churches held a view of soteriology that often resembled certain forms of modern Free Grace theology.

The last Sandemanian church in America closed in the 1890s, while the last meeting house in the United Kingdom fully closed in 1984.

== Beliefs and practice ==
In their practice the Glasite churches aimed at a strict conformity with the primitive type of Christianity, as understood by them. Each congregation had a plurality of elders, pastors, or bishops, who were chosen according to what were believed to be the instructions of Paul, without regard to previous education or present occupation, and who enjoyed a perfect equality in office. (Note: See pages 27 and 31 of Cantor (1991). The role of the elder (or bishop) was to teach and lead the congregation, while the role of the deacon (or deaconess), as defined in Timothy, was to provide for the poor and infirm. Two elders, as referenced in Acts, were required for a church to function, and a plurality was required to celebrate the Lord's Supper. The Edinburgh meeting house closed in 1989 when its membership fell to only one elder.) To have been married a second time disqualified one for ordination, or for continued tenure of the office of bishop. The Glasites opposed the existence of national churches, viewing the kingdom of Christ as essentially spiritual.

In all the action of the church unanimity was considered to be necessary; if any member differed in opinion from the rest, they either surrendered their judgement to that of the church, or were shut out from its communion. To join in prayer with anyone not a member of the denomination was regarded as unlawful, and even to eat or drink with one who had been excommunicated was held to be wrong.

"Things strangled and blood" were rigorously abstained from. They disapproved of all lotteries and games of chance. The accumulation of wealth they held to be unscriptural and improper.

=== Soteriology ===
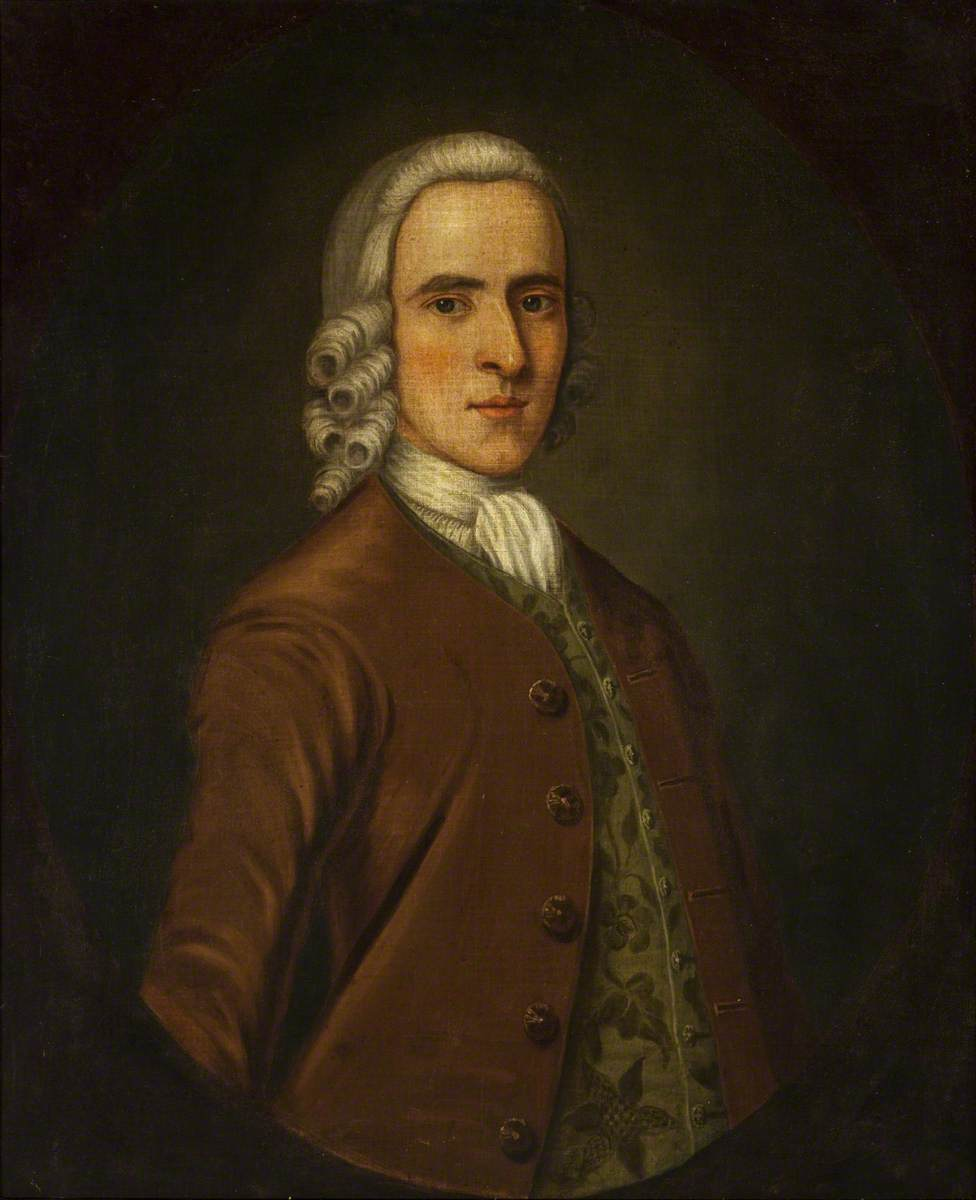
Portrait of Robert Sandeman (29 April 1718 – 2 April 1771)

Glas dissented from the Westminster Confession only in his views as to the spiritual nature of the church and the functions of the civil magistrate. But Sandeman added a distinctive doctrine as to the nature of faith which is thus stated on his tombstone:

That the bare death of Jesus Christ without a thought or deed on the part of man, is sufficient to present the chief of sinners spotless before God.

In a series of letters to James Hervey, the author of Theron and Aspasio, Sandeman maintained that justifying faith is a simple assent to the divine testimony concerning Jesus, differing in no way in its character from belief in any ordinary testimony. The Sandemanian churches have been often associated as teaching an anticipative form of certain types of Free Grace theology.

=== Church service ===
The Lord's Supper was observed weekly, and between forenoon and afternoon service every Sunday a love feast was held at which every member was required to be present. This took the form not of symbolic morsels of wine and bread, as in other communions, but a (relatively) substantial meal, a custom leading to the Glasites' nickname of "Kail Kirk" for the Scotch broth that was served at this setting. This custom may have arisen, in part, as a charitable response to the poverty of most members of this Church and also as a pragmatic response to the length of meetings (particularly the sermons) and the distances some members of the congregation had to travel in order to attend.

At Glasite services, any member who "possesses the gift of edifying the brethren", was allowed to speak. The practice of washing one another's feet was at one time observed; and it was for a long time customary for each brother and sister to receive new members, on admission, with a holy kiss.

== Churches ==
Glasite church building in Dundee

A church was set up by Glas in Dundee following his suspension by the Church of Scotland, with its congregation becoming known as Glasites. The first meeting house in Perth followed in 1733. Glasite churches were also founded in Paisley, Glasgow, Edinburgh, Leith, Arbroath, Montrose, Aberdeen, Dunkeld, Cupar, and Galashiels. Buildings built as Glasite chapels survive in Dundee, Edinburgh and Perth (two), Galashiels and possibly elsewhere.

=== Sandemanian Churches in England ===
Glas's views were again advanced beyond Scotland with Sandeman's publication of Letters on Theron and Aspasio in 1757. The resulting correspondence between the leading church elders, Glas and Sandeman, and English pastors, Samuel Pike, John Barnard, and William Cudworth among others, led to the adoption of this primitive form of Christianity for their London congregations beginning in the early 1760s. John Barnard's petition to Robert Sandeman brought the latter south to London from Scotland in April 1761 with his brother William and John Handasyde, an Elder from the Northumberland meeting house. This visit led to the establishment of the first legitimately constituted Sandemanian congregation on 23 March 1762 at Glover's Hall. To accommodate larger gatherings, this congregation moved initially to Bull and Mouth-Street, St. Martin's Le Grand, and then to Paul's Alley in the Barbican in the autumn of 1778. This third London meeting house was that of Michael Faraday's youth. (Note: John Barnard, uncle of Michael Faraday's father-in-law, Edward, brought followers to his London meeting house, named Glover's Hall around 1760. The 4th London meeting house found in Barnsbury Grove, and Michael Faraday's seat located within were commemorated by Lord Kelvin in 1906. See pages 38–43 of Cantor (1991). The London church record books show 106 members in 1795 (48 men, 58 women) and 110 members in 1842 (31 men, 79 women). These numbers only include those that confessed their faith. They do not include non-members who attended or children. These numbers held steady throughout this period of time.) The Sandemanians relocated to Barnsbury Grove, in north London, in 1862 where they met until nearly the turn of the century. Michael Faraday was a Deacon at Paul's Alley in the Barbican during the 1830s, an Elder there from 1840 to 1844 and again from 1860 to 1864, the final two years of which were at the Barnsbury Grove meeting house. A plaque was installed in the building indicating his seat of prayer. The building was converted into a telephone exchange, and that end of Barnsbury Grove renamed Faraday Close.

Barnsbury Grove, Islington. 2008 photo of a 19th-century Sandemanian meeting house

==== Beyond London ====
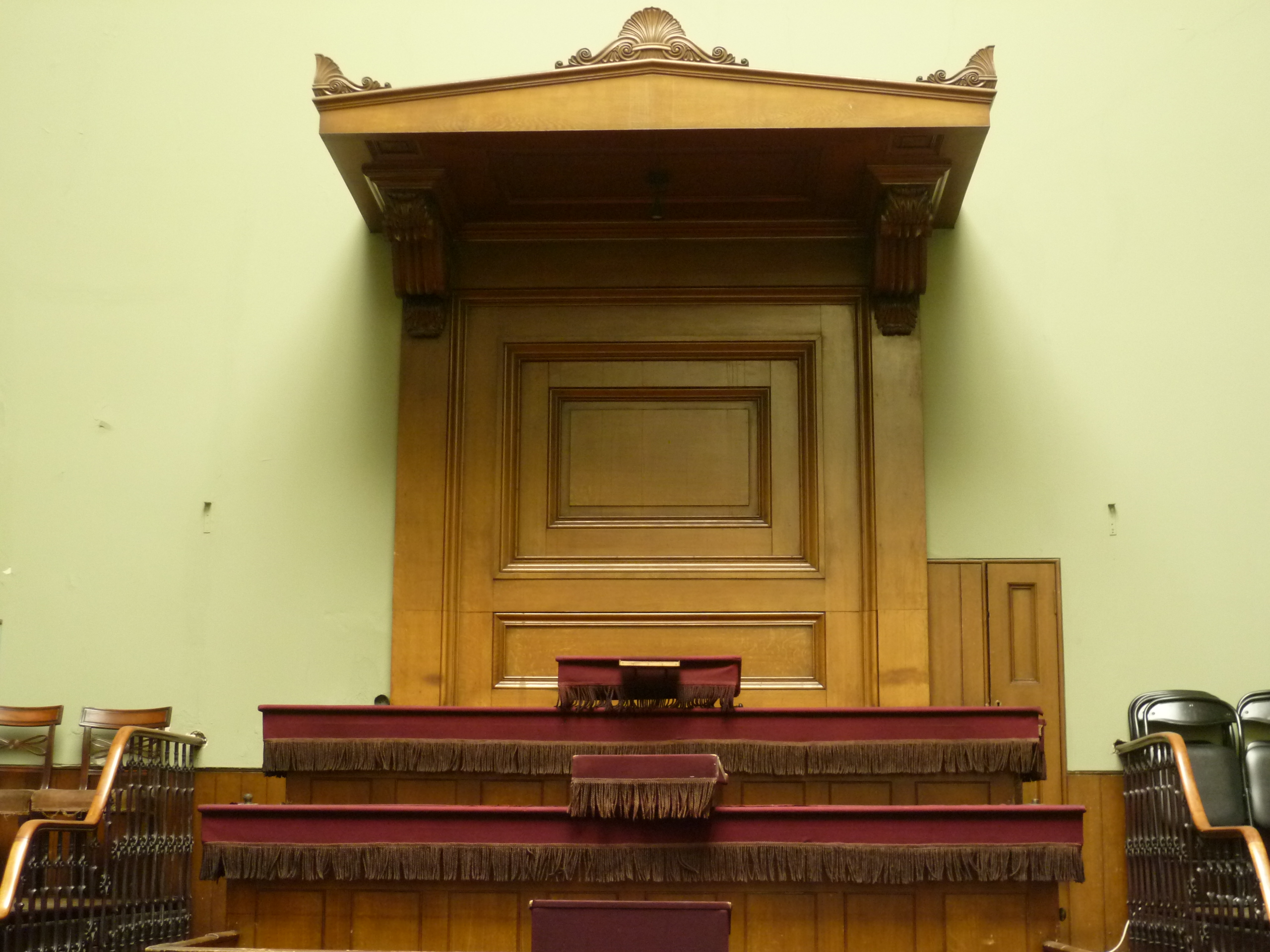
Pulpit in the Glasite Meeting House, Edinburgh

As the congregation on Bull and Mouth-Street, St. Martins-le-Grand, London solidified through the inclusion of noted pastors like Samuel Pike in 1765, other English parishes followed their Sandemanian lead. The first response outside London occurred in Yorkshire with followers of Benjamin Ingham. Ingham discreetly sent two of his preachers, James Allen and William Batty, to Scotland to observe Glasite practices in 1761. Of these three Methodist preachers, only Allen fully converted and began to establish Sandemanian meeting houses in Northern England, to include his hometown of Gayle, Kirkby Stephen, Newby, and Kirkby Lonsdale. By 1768 Allen, together with John Barnard and William Cudworth from London, helped establish congregations in York, Norfolk, Colne, Wethersfield, Liverpool, Whitehaven, Trowbridge and Nottingham. Sandeman personally established fewer than a dozen churches in England including Liverpool before he went to America in 1764. The Trowbridge meeting house, in Wiltshire, was the location to which Samuel Pike moved and at which he preached for the final two years until his death in 1773.

=== Sandemanian churches in America ===
Robert Sandeman sailed into Boston from Glasgow aboard the George and James, captained by Montgomery, on 18 October 1764. At the invitation of Ezra Stiles, Sandeman preached his first sermon in Newport on 28 November. He spent Christmas and most of January 1765 in Danbury, Connecticut, discussing theology and church governance with Ebenezer White and his followers. Over the next four months, Sandeman and his party traveled to New York, Philadelphia, New London, Connecticut, Providence, Rhode Island, and finally Portsmouth, New Hampshire. Sandeman established his first church in Portsmouth on 4 May 1765, accompanied by James Cargill, Andrew Oliphant, and his nephews. Within the month, Sandeman returned to Boston and established his second meetinghouse at the home of Edward Foster. From Boston, he returned to Danbury and created his third church among White's followers, with Joseph Moss White and himself serving as elders. Sandeman referred to his church as formal to distinguish it from Ebenezer White's church, which retained traditional church authority.

Colonial resistance to Sandemanianism initially stemmed from the absence of ministerial authority within their congregations. This lack of a central authority challenged the existing social fabric throughout New England, which relied upon the state to enforce church orthodoxy. As many colonials rose in protest of punitive Crown policies in the decade following Robert Sandeman's arrival, his followers remained passively loyal in Paul's footsteps, setting the stage for bitter estrangement between the factions. It was not until Sandeman's passing in 1771 that the remnants of the Danbury church moved to New Haven and formed the fourth church in America. Sandemanians as a whole were labeled "Loyalists" for their pacifist stance, to conform with Paul's teachings, since they did not oppose the crown like so many of their colonial brethren. Besides passivism, many Boston congregations evacuated with the British. It went into exile in Halifax, Nova Scotia, further escalating the fears of their colonial brethren. This relocation to Halifax led to the formation of the fifth church. A Boston printer, John Howe, followed the British lead to Canada with his family, only to return alone with the British army to document the unfolding war story upon its return to New York. The 'History of Danbury, Connecticut, 1684-1896', by James Montgomery Bailey, mentions three additional Sandemanian congregations located in Taunton, Massachusetts, Newtown, Connecticut, and the Plumtrees district of Bethel, Connecticut. It is not clear what role, if any, Robert Sandeman played in the establishment of these congregations. However, the Boston records indicate he performed several marriages in that city during the winter and spring of 1767 to 1768. Many Loyalist Sandemanians were uprooted during the revolution and lost most of their property. Howe's story exemplifies this situation. In his case, he sailed to Nova Scotia and became an elder in the congregation that formed.

=== Decline ===
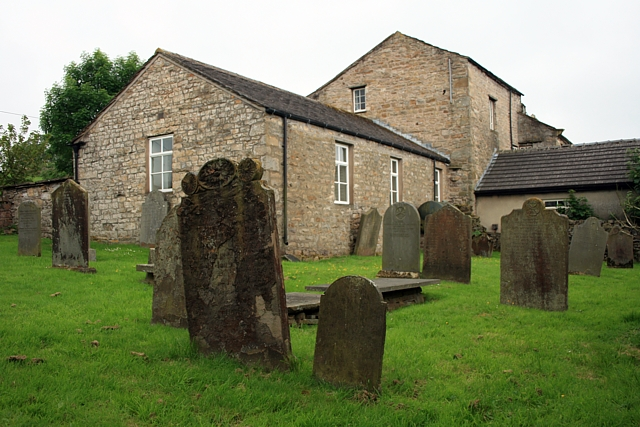
Sandemanian graveyard, Gayle, Yorkshire

The last of the Sandemanian churches in America ceased to exist in 1890. The London meeting house finally closed in 1984. The last Elder of the Church died in Edinburgh in 1999.

Their exclusiveness in practice, neglect of education for the ministry, and the antinomian tendency of their doctrine contributed to their dissolution. Many Glasites joined the general body of Scottish Congregationalists, and the denomination has long been considered extinct.

== Critics of Sandemanianism ==
A prominent critic of Sandemanian beliefs was Baptist Andrew Fuller (1754–1815), who published Strictures on Sandemanianism (1812), in which he argued that if faith concerns the mind only, then there could be no way to distinguish genuine Christians from nominal Christians. He also argued that knowing Christ is more than mental knowledge of facts about him; it involves a desire for fellowship with him and a delight in his presence.

John "Rabbi" Duncan said once that Sandemanianism was "the doctrine of justifying righteousness along with the Popish doctrine of faith."

== Sandemanian families and notable members ==
Prominent Sandemanian families include the surnames Barnard, Baynes, Baxter, Boosey, Bell, Deacon, Faraday, Leighton, Mann, Vincent, Whitelaw and Young. There was a strong link between the Sandemanians and scientists. Notable members of the Sandemanian Church include William Godwin, Michael Faraday, Charles Wilson Vincent and James Baynes.

The Sandemanian church and its members are mentioned several times in Edward Everett Hale's short story "The Brick Moon". In Hale's short story "My Double, and How He Undid Me," the main character and narrator is a Sandemanian minister.

== Archives ==
The archives of the Glasite Church are held by Archive Services at the University of Dundee and have attracted researchers from America.

== Bibliography ==
- Bailey, James M. (James Montgomery), 1841-1894: History of Danbury, Conn., 1684-1896 (Burr Print. House, 1896), also by Susan Benedict Hill
- Barber, John Warner: CONNECTICUT HISTORICAL COLLECTIONS: CONTAINING A GENERAL COLLECTION OF INTERESTING FACTS, TRADITIONS, BIOGRAPHICAL SKETCHES, ANECDOTES, &c. (New Haven, 1836).
- Blakeley, Phyllis Ruth and John N. Grant: Eleven exiles: accounts of Loyalists of the American Revolution, Little, Brown and Co. (Boston, 1864).
- Brentnall, John: Just a Talker: Sayings of John ('Rabbi') Duncan, (Edinburgh: Banner of Truth, 1997).
- Cantor, Geoffrey: Michael Faraday, Sandemanian and Scientist: A Study of Science and Religion in the Nineteenth Century, Macmillan (Hampshire, 1991).
- Edes, Henry Herbert: "The Places of Worship of the Sandemanians in Boston" in Publications of the Colonial Society of Massachusetts, Volume 6, Colonial Society of Massachusetts (Boston, 1904).
- Elmes, James: A Topographical Dictionary of London and its Environs, (London, 1831).
- Fuller, Andrew: Strictures on Sandemanianism, Richard Scott, (New York, 1812).
- Gardner, James: Faiths of the World, A Dictionary All Religions and Religious Sects, their Doctrines, Rites, Ceremonies and Customs, Volume II, Fullerton & Co. (London and Edinburgh, 1858).
- Halleck, George Watson: "The Sandemanians", found in New England magazine, Volume 14 By Sarah Orne Jewett. Kellogg (Boston, 1896).
- Ross, James: History of Congregational Independency in Scotland 2nd Edition. Hay Nisbet & Co. (Glasgow, 1908).
- Sabine, Lorenzo: Biographical sketches of Loyalists of the American Revolution, with an Historical Essay, Volume 1, Little, Brown & Co. (Boston, 1864).
- Smith, John Howard: The Perfect Rule of the Christian Religion: A History of Sandemanianism in the Eighteenth Century (Albany, NY: SUNY Press, 2008).
- Van Kirk, Hiram: A history of the theology of the Disciples of Christ, Christian Publishing Company, St. Louis 1907.
- Wilson, Walter: THE HISTORY AND ANTIQUITIES OF DISSENTING CHURCHES AND MEETING HOUSES IN LONDON, WESTMINSTER, AND SOUTHWARK; INCLUDING THE LIVES OF THEIR MINISTERS, FROM THE RISE OF NONCONFORMITY TO THE PRESENT TIME, 4 Volumes. (London, 1810).
- Boston Biographical Society: "Sandeman" in The Twentieth Century Biographical Dictionary of Notable Americans, (Boston, 1904).
- Boston Registry Dept: Records Relating to the Early History of Boston Containing Boston Marriages from 1752–1809, Volume 30. (Boston, 1884).
- Colonial Society of Massachusetts:Transactions, Volume 6 (Boston, 1904).
- Sandemanian Society: "Sandeman" in THE HISTORICAL MAGAZINE AND NOTES AND QUERIES CONCERNING THE ANTIQUITIES, HISTORY AND BIOGRAPHY OF AMERICA, VOLUMES 17-18 Dawson (Morisania, 1870).
