= Bleachfield =

Field near watercourse used by a bleachery

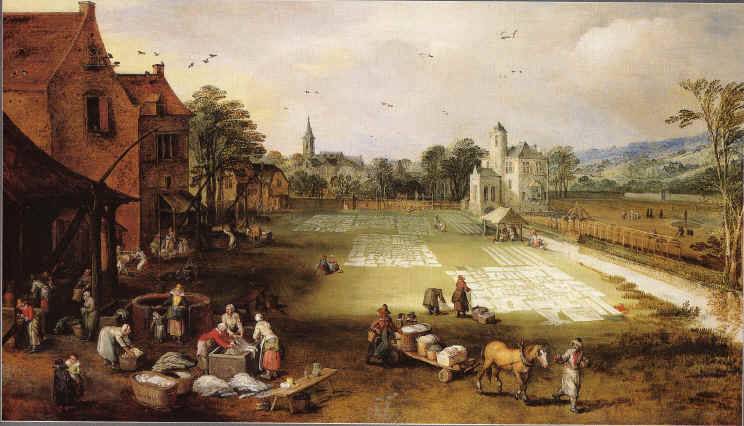
Bleekveld in een dorp (Bleachfield in a village), circa 1650 (Jan Brueghel the Younger)

A bleachfield or bleaching green was an open area used for spreading cloth on the ground to be purified and whitened by the action of the sunlight. Bleaching fields were usually found in and around mill towns in Great Britain and were an integral part of textile manufacture during the British Industrial Revolution.

When cloth-making was still a home-based occupation, the bleachfields could be found on Scottish crofts and English farm fields. Just as wool needed fulling and flax needed retting, so did the semi-finished fabrics need space and time outdoors to bleach. In the 18th century there were many linen bleachfields in Scotland, particularly in Perthshire, Renfrewshire, in the Scottish Lowlands, and the outskirts of Glasgow. By the 1760s, linen manufacture became a major industry in Scotland, second only to agriculture. For instance, in 1782 alone, Perthshire produced 1,700,000 yards (1,600,000 m) of linen, worth £81,000 (£12,577,000 as of 2023).

Bleachfields were also common in northern England; for instance, the name of the town of Whitefield, on the outskirts of Manchester, is thought to derive from the medieval bleachfields used by Flemish settlers.

Bleachfields became redundant after Charles Tennant developed a bleaching powder based on chlorine, which permitted year-round processing of fabric indoors, but many of the factories continued to be called bleachfields.

A bleachfield is similar to, but should not be confused with, a tenterground. Bleachfields were a popular subject for Dutch painters in the 17th century. One of the stained glass windows made by Stephen Adam for the Maryhill Burgh Halls in 1878 shows linen bleachers at work.

== See also ==
- Grassing (textiles)
- Timeline of clothing and textiles technology
