= Donald Leonard =

Don or Donald Leonard may refer to:

- Don Leonard (actor) (1925–2002), South African film actor
- Donald J. Leonard (born 1933), American electrical engineer and business executive
- Don Leonard (politician), U.S. Representative-elect from Ohio

== See also ==
- Daniel Leonard (disambiguation)
- Dion Leonard (born 1975), Australian-British athlete
