= Daily Gleaner =

Daily Gleaner may refer to:

- The Daily Gleaner, a newspaper published in New Brunswick, Canada
- The Gleaner, a daily newspaper, formerly known as The Daily Gleaner, published by the Gleaner Company in Kingston, Jamaica
