= History of Jamaican newspapers =

In Colonial Jamaica, during the 18th and 19th centuries, there were a number of newspapers that represented the views of the white planters who owned slaves. These newspapers included the Royal Gazette, The Diary and Kingston Daily Advertiser, Cornwall Chronicle, Cornwall Gazette, and Jamaica Courant. These newspapers often served parochial interests. The Diary and Kingston Advertiser served white residents in the city of Kingston and surrounding areas, while the Cornwall Chronicle and Cornwall Gazette catered to white planters and merchants in Montego Bay and surrounding areas. In 1826, two free coloureds, Edward Jordan and Robert Osborn, founded The Watchman, which openly campaigned for the rights of free coloureds, and became Jamaica's first anti-slavery newspaper. In 1830, Jamaican colonial authorities arrested Jordan, the editor, and charged him with constructive treason. However, Jordan was eventually acquitted, and became Mayor of Kingston in post-Emancipation Jamaica.

On the abolition of slavery in the 1830s, Gleaner Company was founded by two Jamaican Jewish brothers, Joshua and Jacob De Cordova. While the Gleaner represented the new establishment for the next century, there was a growing black nationalist movement that campaigned for increased political representation and rights in the early twentieth century. To this end, Osmond Theodore Fairclough founded Public Opinion in 1937. O.T. Fairclough was supported by radical journalists Frank Hill and H.P. Jacobs, and the first editorial of this new newspaper tried to galvanise public opinion around a new nationalism. Strongly aligned to the People's National Party (PNP), Public Opinion counted among its journalists progressive figures such as Roger Mais, Una Marson, Amy Bailey, Louis Marriott, Peter Abrahams, and future prime minister Michael Manley, among others.

While Public Opinion campaigned for self-government, British prime minister Winston Churchill made it known he had no intention of presiding "over the liquidation of the British Empire", and consequently the Jamaican nationalists in the PNP were disappointed with the watered-down constitution that was handed down to Jamaica in 1944. Mais wrote an article saying "Now we know why the draft of the new constitution has not been published before," because the underlings of Churchill were "all over the British Empire implementing the real imperial policy implicit in the statement by the Prime Minister". The British colonial police raided the offices of Public Opinion, seized Mais's manuscript, arrested Mais himself, and convicted him of seditious libel, jailing him for six months.

In the 1960s, Jamaican prime minister Alexander Bustamante banned the flow of government advertising to Public Opinion, and the newspaper eventually closed down a few years later.

== See also ==
- List of newspapers in Jamaica

== Bibliography ==
- Aggrey Brown (1990). "Mass Media in Jamaica". In Stuart H. Surlin; Walter C. Soderlund (eds.). Mass Media and the Caribbean. New York: Gordon and Breach. pp. 11–28. ISBN 978-2-88124-447-6.
