= Daniel Leonard (disambiguation) =

Daniel Leonard (1740–1829) was a Loyalist in the American Revolution.

Daniel Leonard may also refer to:

- Dan Leonard (born 1949), a former member of the Indiana House of Representatives
- Daniel Leonard (c. 1818–1878), whose wife Mary Leonard (1845–1912) was accused and acquitted for his murder
- Admiral Daniel Leonard, a character from the Star Trek: Enterprise series premiere "Broken Bow"
- Daniel Leonard Nigro, an American musician, songwriter, instrumentalist, and record producer
- Daniel L. Norris, (1935–2008), a commissioner of the Northwest Territories (Canada)
- Daniel Leonard James Poulter (born 1978), a British Conservative Party politician

== See also ==
- Donald Leonard (disambiguation)
- Dion Leonard (born 1975), an Australian/British endurance athlete and ultramarathon runner, motivational speaker, and author
- Leonard Daniel Andreas Terfelt (born 1976), a Swedish actor
