= The Royal Gazette (Jamaica) =

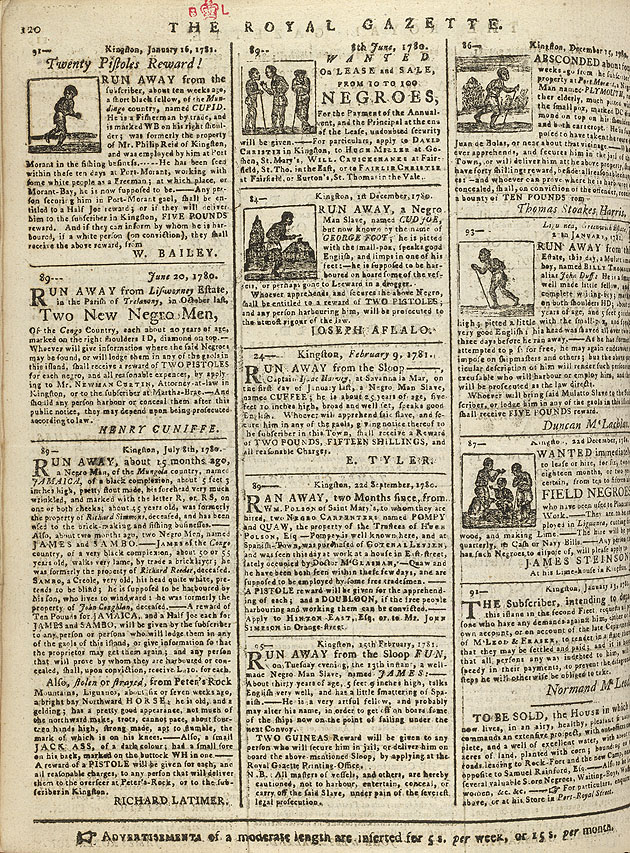
Page from The Royal Gazette, 19 May 1781, featuring notices of escaped slaves.

The Royal Gazette was a Jamaican newspaper. It was founded in 1779 as The Jamaica Mercury, and Kingston Weekly Advertiser by David Douglass and William Aikman and became The Royal Gazette in 1780 after it obtained government patronage. It was aimed at the white planters and slave-owners on the island and in its early years often contained notices of escaped slaves. It later became the Royal Gazette and Jamaica Times.

== See also ==
- History of Jamaican newspapers
- List of newspapers in Jamaica
