= Richard Draper =

American newspaper printer (1726–1774)

Richard Draper (1726–1774) was an early American Boston printer and an editor of The Boston News-Letter. Together with his father and his nephew Draper printed and published The News-Letter. In the years leading up to the American Revolution Draper sided with the Loyalists and the Tory party, and through his newspaper he provided a voice for the Loyalist writers in Massachusetts and elsewhere.

== Early life and family ==
Richard Draper was born on February 24, 1726, to John Draper and Deborah Green. His father began teaching him the printing trade at an early age. Richard's grandfather was also named Richard Draper who, with his brother William, emigrated from England to Boston in the American colonies in 1680. He became a Boston merchant and was a well known member of Boston's Old South Church. Richard married Margaret Green Draper, the great-granddaughter of Samuel Green and a cousin with whom he had no children, but they adopted one of Margaret's nieces.

John served as the apprentice for Bartholomew Green, who was the publisher of The Boston News-Letter, of which Richard assumed the editorship when Green died in 1732. He married Bartholomew's daughter, Dorothy Green. When John died in 1762, Richard in turn assumed the editorship of the News-Letter. Richard Draper married Margaret Green Draper, the granddaughter of Bartholomew.

== Printing career ==
Richard's father, John Draper printed The Boston News-Letter for thirty years. During the several years before John Draper's death Richard was his silent partner. When John died in November 1762, Richard continued printing and publishing the newspaper, whereupon he changed the title to The Boston Weekly News Letter and New England Chronicle. After a year he changed the title to The Massachusetts Gazette; and Boston News-Letter, with the king's coat of arms in the center of the heading and served as the leading Tory newspaper. About this time Richard took on as an apprentice, and later formed a partnership, with his nephew Samuel Draper. At this time Draper acquired the printing contract for Governor Bernard and the council where his newspaper's heading included an imprint which stated, "Published by Richard Draper, Printer to the Governor and Council, and by Samuel Draper, at the Printing Office in Newbury Street." Shortly thereafter Samuel died and Richard conducted business for several years without a partner. Early in his career he was appointed as the official printer for the provincial governor and council of Massachusetts, a position which he held until his final years.

In 1768 Richard merged The Massachusetts Gazette with The Boston Post-Boy, which functioned as a Tory newspaper that gave voice to the British party line during the taxation controversies between the colonies and England. At the behest of the royal colonial government the inscription in the Gazette read "Published by Authority". The heading of the Gazette underwent several changes before its permanent title was finally established.

As the controversies between the colonies and England mounted, Draper aligned himself with the Loyalists. Through his Gazette he gave voice to the various Loyalist and Tory writers in Massachusetts who defended the British Crown, Parliament, and the royal governor, all of whom wrote critical essays aimed at the Whigs and the idea of American independence. Writers included various prominent men such as Andrew Oliver, William Brattle, Jonathan Sewall and Daniel Leonard. These articles, were promptly answered by John Adams and Samuel Adams in The Boston Gazette. When Andrew Oliver resigned on August 14, 1765, because of his disfavor of and being a collector of the unpopular Stamp Act, The Boston Gazette accused Draper and his Gazette of intentionally ignoring the affair.

== Final days and legacy ==
In May 1774, Draper took John Boyle as a partner in publishing the News Letter; however, the next month Draper died. Margaret Draper, his widow, continued the newspaper, while Boyle was for a brief period her partner. When the British evacuated Boston in 1776 Draper and her partner ceased publication of the News-Letter, which had been published for seventy-two years. The Draper home Richard had built on Newbury Street was confiscated by patriot forces after the British had fled the city.

Richard Draper was a man of ill health most of his life, but was considered, "...remarkable for the delicacy of his mind and gentleness of his manner" where it is said that, "No stain rests on his character."

Draper was persistent in his Loyalist views, but the subsequent stress took an additional toll on his health. He died on June 5, 1774, at the age of 48, leaving no children. His wife, Margaret, continued with and conducted the business for several months, and then formed a business connection with Loyalist John Howe. Draper is buried at Granary Burying Ground, in Boston.

== See also ==
- List of early American publishers and printers

== Bibliography ==
- Davidson, Philip (1941). Propaganda and the American Revolution, 1763-1783. Vol. 10. University of North Carolina Press.
- Dickerson, O. M. (December 1951). "British Control of American Newspapers on the Eve of the Revolution". The New England Quarterly. 24 (4). The New England Quarterly, Inc.: 453–468. doi:10.2307/361338. JSTOR 361338.
- Draper, Thomas Waln-Morgan (1892). The Drapers in America, being a history and genealogy of those of that name and connection. New York, J. Polhemus Printing Company.
- Hudson, Frederic (1873). Journalism in the United States, from 1690 to 1872. New York: Harper & Brothers.
- Malone (1932). Dictionary of American biography. Vol. V.
  New York: Charles Scribner's Sons.
- Stark, James Henry (1910). The Loyalists of Massachusetts and the other side of the American Revolution. Boston : James H. Stark.
- Ritchie, Donald A. (1997). American journalists : getting the story. New York : Oxford University Press. ISBN 978-0-1950-9907-2.
- Thomas, Isaiah (1874). The history of printing in America, with a biography of printers. Vol. I. New York: B. Franklin.
- —— (1874). The history of printing in America, with a biography of printers. Vol. II. New York, B. Franklin.
- Weeks, Lyman Horace; Bacon, Edwin Munroe (1911). An historical digest of the provincial press. Boston, Society for americana.
- Wroth, Lawrence C. (1938). The Colonial Printer. Portland, Me., The Southworth-Anthoensen press.
- The Encyclopedia Americana; a library of universal knowledge. Vol. IV. New York, The Encyclopedia Americana Corp. 1922.
