= The Massachusetts Gazette =

Colonial American newspaper (c. 1732 – after 1774)

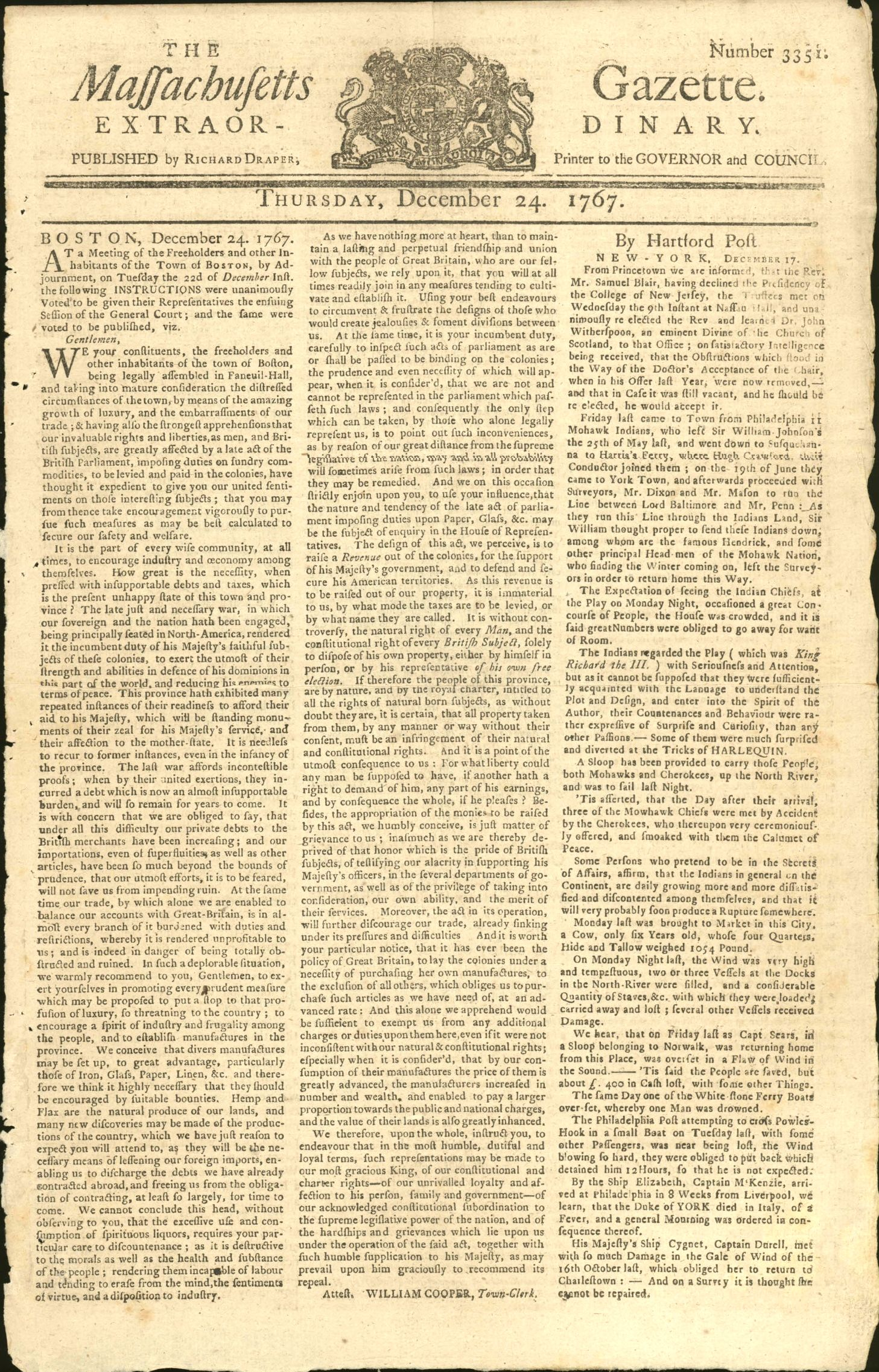
The Massachusetts Gazette December 24, 1767 issue

The Massachusetts Gazette was a colonial American newspaper established by Richard Draper, printer for the royal governor and council in the Province of Massachusetts Bay. As the American Revolution drew closer, it was commissioned by the colonial government to lend its support for the measures of the British ministry. It was one of the few Loyalist newspapers operating during the years leading up to the revolution.

== Publication history ==
Draper's father, John Draper, was the publisher of The Boston News-Letter who for thirty years was its publisher. On the death of his father in November 1762, Richard Draper took over publication of the News Letter. This newspaper was devoted to the royal British government and in the controversy between Great Britain and the colonies he, as a Loyalist, supported the British Crown through this newspaper. Richard enlarged the newspaper title to The Boston Weekly News Letter and New England' Chronicle. A year later he changed it again to The Massachusetts Gazette; and Boston News Letter and printed the emblem of the King's arms in the heading. In 1768 it was united with The Boston Post-Boy. Draper's Post-Boy, was a Tory newspaper that seldom went afield from the British party line. He had the printing contract for Governor Bernard and the council and used the words Massachusetts Gazette as a part of the title. The union of these two newspapers was something of an unusual match and lasted only a short term. Although the united newspapers were both called The Massachusetts Gazette, each continued as a separate publication; The Post-Boy was released on Mondays, with The News-Letter appearing on Thursdays. Together they came to be known as the "Siamese Twins" in journalism. This arrangement lasted from May 23, 1768, until September 25, 1769. Draper, upon his separation of the twin newspapers, kept alive only The News-Letter.

William Goddard announced this latest development and the appearance of The Massachusetts Gazette in his Pennsylvania Chronicle, in the February 12, 1770 issue.

Richard Draper's physical constitution was very weak, and he was often confined to his home by sickness. Soon after Richard's father died he took on Samuel Draper as a silent partner, who was connected with Zechariah Fowle, and established the firm of Richard. & Samuel. Draper The heading of the Gazette was inscribed with, "Published by Richard Draper, Printer to the Governor and Council, and by Samuel Draper, at the Printing Office in Newbury Street.". Draper employed a fair number of Loyalist writers, but he was competing with pro-independence newspapers which were greater in number, as were pro-independence writers.

The Massachusetts provincial government made great efforts to counteract the influence of The Boston Gazette, and such writers as the Samuel Adams and the Quincys, and The Spy, a newspaper with its staff of contributors equally bold and resolute. The authorities then found recourse for publishing their views and almost exclusively fell back on The Massachusetts Gazette and Weekly News-Letter. All the Tory/Loyalist writers concentrated their voicing their views through the Boston Gazette Tory writers like Andrew Oliver, William Brattle, Daniel Leonard, and Jonathan Sewall now aimed their views at the pro independence Whigs.

News of a large shipment of stamped paper headed for the colonies had been received at Boston, in July. On August 5 the news was published for the first time in the Massachusetts Gazette & News-Letter, which included a list of men who had been appointed to distribute Stamps in the various Colonies. Andrew Oliver for Massachusetts was among those mentioned. At this time various newspapers in the colonies suspended their publications rather than submit to what they considered an unfair and burdensome tax upon paper. A ship laden with stamped paper arrived in Boston harbor in September.

On the death of Richard Draper on June 6, 1774, his widow and his partner, John Boyle, took over operations and published the paper.

== See also ==
- Early American publishers and printers
- List of early American publishers and printers
- Newspapers of colonial America

== Bibliography ==
- Dickerson, O. M. (December 1951). "British Control of American Newspapers on the Eve of the Revolution". The New England Quarterly. 24 (4). The New England Quarterly, Inc.: 453–468. doi:10.2307/361338. JSTOR 361338.
- Drake, Samuel Gardner (1856). The history & antiquities of Boston : from its settlement in 1630, to the year 1770. Boston : Luther Stevens.
- Hudson, Frederic (1873). Journalism in the United States, from 1690 to 1872. New York, Harper & Brothers.
- Lee, James Melvin (1923). History of American journalism. Boston, New York, Houghton Mifflin Company.
- Thomas, Isaiah (1874). The history of printing in America, with a biography of printers. Vol. I. New York, B. Franklin.
- —— (1874). The history of printing in America, with a biography of printers. Vol. II. New York, B. Franklin.
- Wroth, Lawrence C. (1922). A History of Printing in Colonial Maryland, 1686–1776. Baltimore : Typothetae of Baltimore.
