= Weekly Jamaica Courant =

First newspaper in colonial Jamaica

Coordinates: 17.967°N 76.792°W

- Front cover of Weekly Jamaica Courant issue number 10 (Note: Damaged.)
- Type: Weekly newspaper
- Format: Tabloid
- Publisher: Robert Baldwin (Note: To 1722.); Mary Baldwin (Note: From 1722 to 1734.); Peter & Robert Baldwin Jr. (Note: From 1734 to 1746.); Unknown publisher (Note: From 1746 to 1755.)
- Editor: Robert Baldwin; Mary Baldwin; Peter & Robert Baldwin Jr.; Unknown editor
- Founded: on or before 28 May 1718
- Ceased publication: in 1755
- City: Kingston
- Country: Jamaica
- Price: 10/– per annum; 1 bit per issue (Note: The Courant cost "one bit" per issue, or "three-half-crowns a quarter" subscription. At the time, in Jamaica, a bit was one Spanish real, which is to say, 1/8 of a Spanish dollar. A subscription costing three half crowns each quarter would cost 10/– Pounds sterling (in £sd) per annum.)
- OCLC number: 1069647674

The Weekly Jamaica Courant, published as The Weekly Jamaica Courant, with News Foreign and Domestick, was the first newspaper published in colonial Jamaica and the West Indies, in what is now Jamaica and the Commonwealth Caribbean, and the second multi-issue newspaper of British America, now Anglo-America, after the Boston News-Letter. The Courant was first published in early 1718 in Kingston, following a late 1717 attempt by governor Nicholas Lawes to establish a printing press in the island. The officially-requested press was set up by printer Robert Baldwin, whose family edited and published the paper until the 1740s. The periodical ended its run in 1755, and was succeeded or replaced by the Jamaica Gazette or the St. Jago de la Vega Gazette. Very few copies of the Courant survive today.

The Courant was published by authority, after review by the censor of Jamaica. It covered overseas and domestic news, official proceedings, and shipping and commerce. Local merchants and planters are thought to have formed the bulk of the Courant's readership. Its paid advertisements may have especially focussed on runaway slaves.

== History ==
Kingston Harbour in the 1770s, with Port Royal and Kingston (background) (Note: Peter Mazell engraving in Edward Long's History of Jamaica.)

On 1 October 1717, governor Nicholas Lawes formally requested permission from the Board of Trade in London to establish a local printing press, saying, "I am of opinion if a printing press were set up in Jamaica it would be of great use, and benefit for publick intelligence, advertisement, and many other things. But to prevent abuses, that might attend such a liberty, there should be but one, and that to be licensed to the Govr. (Note: Governor.) for the time being". Lawes presented his case before the said board in person on 10 October 1717, further adding that a press "would be a publick convenience and advantage to commerce" in the colony. Unlike an earlier attempt at setting up a Jamaican press in late 1715 by the Legislative Council, this endeavour by the governor did pan out, as the requested press was installed by printer Robert Baldwin in April or May 1718 on Church Street, Kingston.

Baldwin is thought to have been enticed to the island by being guaranteed a government contract for the printing of official business. The printer likely chose Kingston as his base for its greater commercial opportunities (it and Port Royal, both on Kingston Harbour, being the commercial centre of the colony), as opposed to Spanish Town (the administrative capital). Baldwin's first publication is thought to have been A pindarique ode on the arrival of his Excellency Sir Nicholas Lawes, a four-page pindarique in pamphlet form, published in 1718. Like earlier 17th-century presses of British America, the Baldwin press likely supplemented their income by additionally meeting the printing needs of smaller West Indian colonies without a press of their own.

=== Establishment ===
The Courant's date of first publication is uncertain. The earliest known surviving issue is that of 28 May 1718, which may well have been the paper's inaugural instalment, according to Victoria University of Wellington professor Roderick Cave. However, according to Institute of Jamaica historian Frank Cundall, the first issue may have rather been that of 11 February 1718, as this number is referenced in other literature of the period, but is no longer extant. In either case though, the Courant was thereby the first newspaper published in the West Indies, and the second regular newspaper in British America, preceded only by the Boston News-Letter of Massachusetts, which launched in 1704. A century after the fact, the Jamaican press reflected on the event, saying, "The establishment of a printing press in this Island ... proved a considerable convenience to the Government, and the commercial body of that day. The mercantile consignments were then published, and with facility circulated. The previous method employed to give notoriety to the arrivals of articles of mart, was having a written list attached to door posts of the respective stores, or by engaging a Negro to proclaim the catalogue through the streets".

=== Run ===
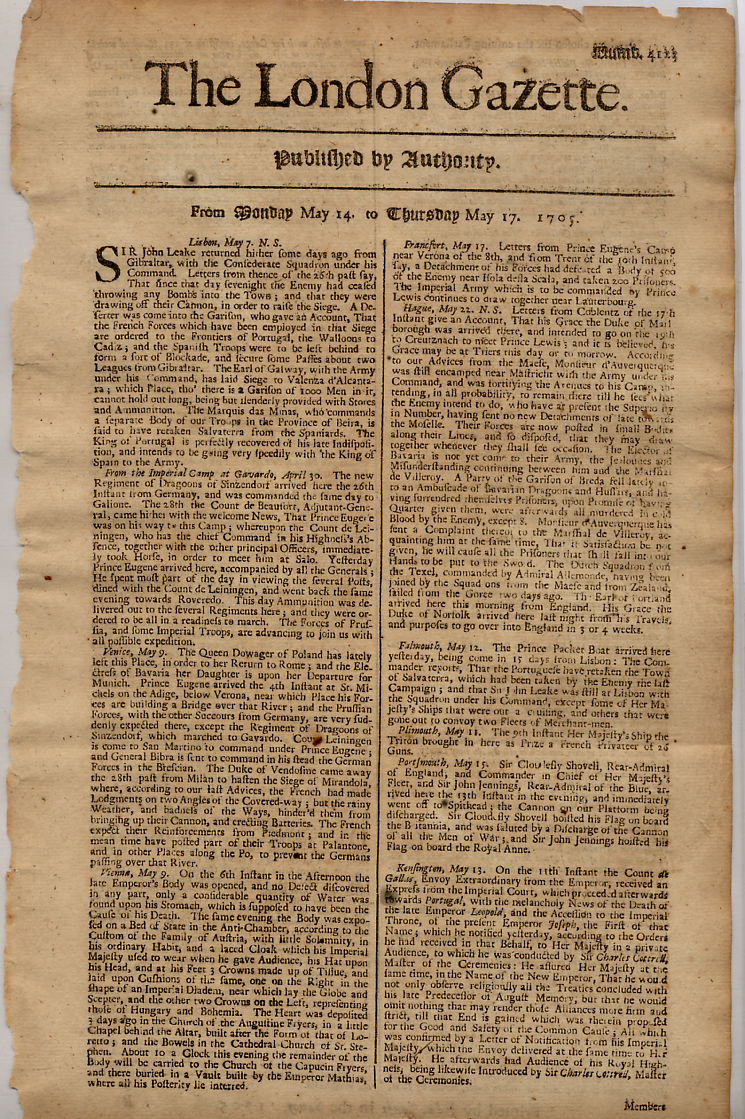
The Courant's design is thought to have been modelled after the London Gazette's (1705 issue front page shown)

The Courant was published by authority. Each issue had to pass review by the censor of Jamaica, Thomas Ridout, prior to publication, as their imprimatur was required. The paper was edited by Robert Baldwin until the first quarter of 1722; by his widow Mary until sometime during 1734; by their sons Peter and Robert Junior until 5 February 1746; and by an unnamed editor after this.

The Courant was usually printed in tabloid format, in four sheets of 17 1/2 by 22 1/2 inches (444.5 by 571.5 mm). The early layout of its copy seems to have been modelled after that of the London Gazette, as early issues bore a graphical resemblance to the latter, according to Cave. The paper's design and format were modified in the 1720s. It was published by Robert Baldwin until the first quarter of 1722; by his widow Mary until sometime during 1734; by their sons Peter and Robert Junior until 5 February 1746; and by an unnamed publisher after this.

The Courant covered European news (as gleaned from British papers brought over to Port Royal), government business, and some local news; it also provided prices current and shipping intelligence, in addition to the usual commercial advertisements. Its news coverage seems to have remained unchanged throughout the paper's history. According to Cave, notices offering rewards for runaway black slaves and white indentured servants constituted the bulk of the Courant's ads, at least based an analysis of extant issues. The issue for 12 September 1722, notably, gave an account of the 28 August 1722 hurricane, which claimed 400 lives.

The Courant cost "one bit [per issue], or three-half-crowns a quarter" annual subscription. The paper's readership is thought to have comprised mainly Jamaican merchants and planters. Distribution was organised by parish, with various of the press's agents taking subscriptions, and slaves delivering the issues.

=== Disestablishment ===
As with its date of first publication, the Courant's date of last publication is uncertain. Its last issue is generally thought to have been published sometime in 1755. The paper may have been continued by the St. Jago de la Vega Gazette, first published in 1755, or it may have been merged with or succeeded by the Jamaica Gazette, first published in 1745.

== Legacy ==
Extant issues of the Courant are exceedingly rare today; in Cave's words, "pitifully few copies have survived the ravages of time, hurricane and termites". As an illustrative example, the earliest surviving issues, for 30 July and 5 August 1718, were preserved only due to their removal from Jamaica, as Baldwin had used them as pasteboard to bind a Royal Navy logbook due for the Board of Trade in London. As of 1975, only fifteen of the paper's issues were known of.

== See also ==
- List of newspapers in Jamaica

== Notes and references ==
=== References ===
1. Cave, Roderick (1975). "Printing comes to Jamaica". Jamaica Journal. Vol. 9, no. 2–3. Kingston: Institute of Jamaica. pp. 11–18.
2. Cave, Roderick (1976). "Printing in Nineteenth-Century Belize". Library Quarterly. 46 (1): 20–37. doi:10.1086/620464. JSTOR 4306599.
3. Cave, Roderick (1978). "Early Printing and the Book Trade in the West Indies". Library Quarterly. 48 (2): 163–192. JSTOR 4306937.
4. Cundall, Frank (1916). The press and printers of Jamaica prior to 1820. Worcester, Mass.: American Antiquarian Society. hdl:2027/hvd.32044024430100. OCLC 621457.
5. Cundall, Frank (1935). A history of printing in Jamaica from 1717 to 1834. Kingston, Jam.: Institute of Jamaica. OCLC 493836.
6. Ledward, K. H., ed. (1924). March 1715 - October 1718. Journals of the Board of Trade and Plantations. Vol. 3. London: Her Majesty's Stationery Office. hdl:2027/msu.31293027029853.
7. Lent, John A. (1976). "The Oldest Existing Newspapers in the Commonwealth Caribbean". Caribbean Quarterly. 22 (4): 90–106. JSTOR 23050567.
8. Martin, Robert Montgomery (1834). Possessions in the West Indies. History of the British colonies. Vol. 2. London: Cochrane & McCrone. hdl:2027/hvd.32044009927740. OCLC 1155228020.
9. McMurtie, Douglas Crawford (1934). The early press of Jamaica (1st ed.). Metuchen, N.J.: Priv. print. hdl:2027/txu.059173023849961. OCLC 3429184.
10. McMurtie, Douglas Crawford (1942) [First published 1934]. The first printing in Jamaica, with a discussion of the date of the first establishment of a press on the island by Robert Baldwin (2nd ed.). Evanston, Ill.: Priv. print. OCLC 2457982.
