= Ebenezer Pemberton (minister) =

American Congregational clergyman, bibliophile and minister

The Reverend Ebenezer Pemberton
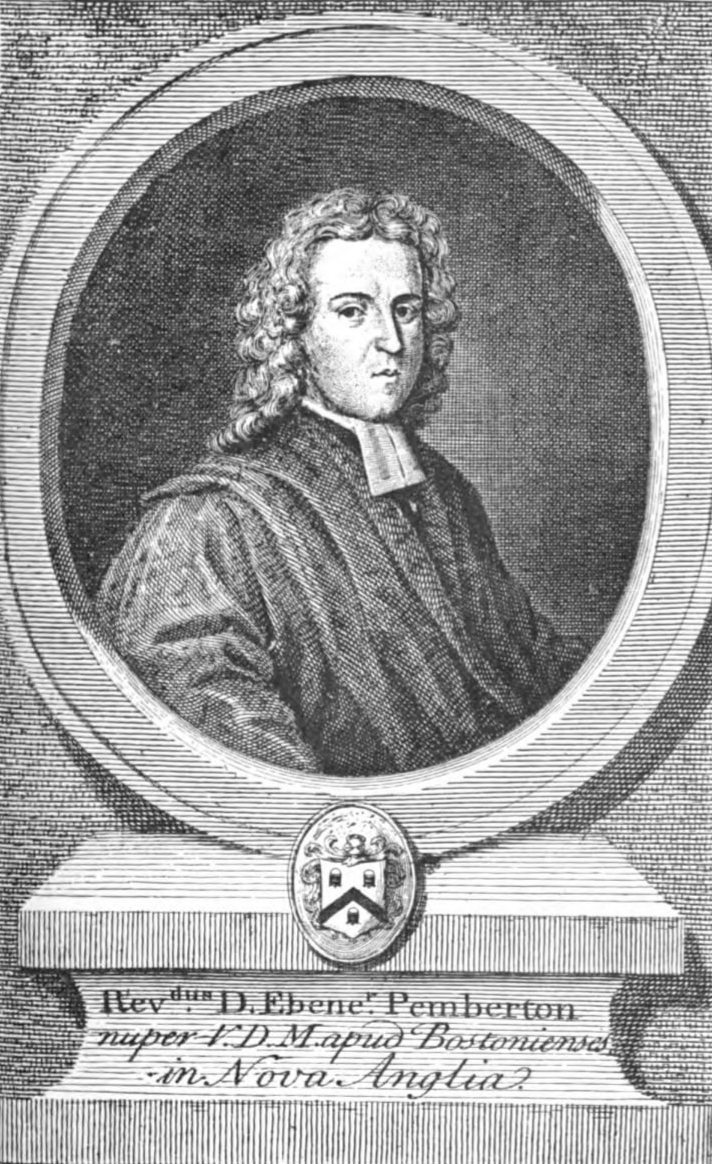
- A copper engraving of Pemberton, published in 1727.
- Born: Ebenezer Pemberton; February 3, 1671; Boston, Massachusetts Bay Colony, British America
- Died: February 13, 1717 (aged 46); Boston, Massachusetts Bay Colony, British America
- Education: Harvard College (1691)
- Spouse: Mary Clark (m. 1701)
- Children: 7

Ebenezer Pemberton (February 3, 1671 – February 13, 1717) (Note: Pemberton's death is disputed between 1717 and 1718. Shipton provides the most convincing evidence for 1717, attributing Pemberton's death to the unusually harsh winter of 1716-1717.) was a colonial American Congregational clergyman, bibliophile, and minister of the Old South Church in Boston from 1700 to 1717. Under his ministry, the church broadened the scope of its worship and increased the privileges of its pupils, but also turned back to Puritan tradition. He wrote thirteen sermons and owned a valuable personal library.

== Career ==
Pemberton was born in Boston to James Pemberton and Sarah Marshall. He was the youngest of eleven children. He attended Harvard College and graduated in 1691 with an A.M. degree. He was well regarded as a student, keeping himself out of trouble. President of the college Increase Mather noted Pemberton "had a Pregnant Wit, and Strong Memory, and was a hard Student". His classmate Benjamin Colman said, "he excell'd both at the grammar-school and college." He would remain associated with the college during his career in the ministry. He was the librarian from 1693 to 1697 and in 1697 chosen to be a tutor. He held both positions again from 1707 to 1717 and was also elected a fellow in 1707. He was a member of the Cambridge Association, a group of clergymen that met in the Harvard College library.

=== Ministry ===
Pemberton was encouraged to join the ministry very soon after graduating from Harvard. He received an offer from Charles Morton on November 23, 1694, to serve as minister at a church in Charlestown, but he declined, likely because he found himself too young. He was given the offer again three years later but declined once more. The position was taken by Simon Bradstreet. Around the same time, Samuel Willard, then minister of the Old South Church, identified Pemberton as his potential successor. By September 30, 1698, the church had two candidates to assist Willard: Pemberton and Jabez Fitch. Eventually, on February 21, 1699/1700, they decided to invite Pemberton. He was ordained, in "a very great Assembly", assistant minister of the Old South Church on August 28, 1700, as it was the policy of the church to have two ministers of relatively equal standing. Pemberton's father James was one of the founders of the church.

After the death of Willard in 1707, Pemberton became the sole minister. He was well-liked by the church, but sometimes angered his pupils for his liberal political views, which compelled him to prematurely readmit sinners to the covenant. In protest, churchgoers would wear hats during his services, which was not allowed. While minister he fought against the suspension of a law requiring the Church of England to provide funds to Congregational churches in British America. In opposition to Increase Mather, Pemberton along with John Leverett and Thomas Brattle proposed changes in the church that aimed to broaden the church's membership and scope. They believed that people should not have to provide anecdotal evidence of "religious experiences" to gain membership to the church, that all baptized adults should have the right to vote in ministerial elections, and that all children should be baptized so long as they have a Christian sponsor. Furthermore, they believed the Scriptures should be read without comments from the reader, as is Puritan custom.

On September 16, 1713, he ordained his new colleague, the Reverend Joseph Sewall. Pemberton was known to have a short temper and previously had disagreements with Sewall's father Judge Samuel Sewall, but overall the two were "generally happy and kindly".

=== Later life ===
Coat of Arms of Ebenezer Pemberton

Pemberton grew sick later in life and his temper grew only more erratic. He was already in poor health upon the ordination of Sewall. In late September 1715, he suffered from hemorrhoids and had to be replaced temporarily by another minister. Benjamin Franklin, one of his subjects, recalled his absence and Sewall recorded his sickness on the 29th of September.

During the unusually harsh winter of 1716–1717, he died on February 13, 1717, at about 3:45 p.m., in Boston with both Joseph Sewall and Sewall's father by his side. Cotton Mather, reflecting on Pemberton, said he was "a man of greater Abilities than many others: and, no doubt, a pious man: but a man of a strangely choleric and envious Temper, and one who had Created unto me more Trials of my Patience, and more Clogs upon my Opportunities to do good, than almost any other Man in the World."

His works, many of which were published individually during his lifetime, were gathered and published posthumously in a single volume in 1727. Pemberton amassed a large collection of books over his lifetime, which was sold at auction after his death. It included a total of 1000 volumes: 159 folios, 163 quartos, and 678 octavos.

== Publications ==
Pemberton's works consist primarily of sermons while minister of the South Church. The following is a complete list. Note that the year of publication may not coincide with the year of delivery. Footnotes to external links to texts are provided when available.

- The Souldier Defended & Directed (Boston, 1701). Preached to the Artillery Company of Boston.
- A Christian Fixed in his Post (Boston, 1704)
- Advice to a Son (London, 1705). A sermon at the request of a gentleman in New England, upon his son's going to Europe.
- A Sermon Preached in the Audience of the General Assembly (Boston, 1706). Delivered November 1, 1705. Titled Ill-bonding Symptoms in Sermons and Discourses.
- A Funeral Sermon on the Death of the Reverend Mr. Samuel Willard (Boston, 1707)
- The Divine Original and Dignity of Government Asserted (Boston, 1710). An election sermon. Regarded as Pemberton's most successful work.
- To the Reader in Samuel Willard's Some Brief Sacramental Meditations (Boston, 1711). Republished in Boston in 1743.
- A True Servant: A Sermon on the Death of John Walley (Boston, 1712)
- A Brief Account of the State of the Providence By a Lover of his Country (Boston, 1717). Co-authored with Cotton Mather.
- A Discourse had Previous to the Ordination of the Reverend Mr. Joseph Sewall in Thomas Prince's A Sermon Delivered (Boston, 1718). A sermon delivered upon the ordination of Joseph Sewall September 16, 1713. It was published for the ordination of Thomas Prince to the Old South Church. It includes sections by Increase Mather and Cotton Mather.
- Epistle to the Reader in Benjamin Colman's A Humble Discourse (Boston, 1715). Republished in Boston in 1740.
- Epistle to the Reader in Joseph Sewall's Desires that Joshua's Resolution may be Revived (Boston, 1716)
- The Author's Character in Samuel Willard's A Compleat Body of Divinity (Boston, 1726). Published posthumously. Extracted from Samuel Willard's funeral sermon.
- Sermons and Discourses on Several Occasions (London, 1727). A collection of Pemberton's works published posthumously in London. All of the works are listed above.

== Personal life ==
Pemberton married Mary Clark on June 12, 1701. Clark was born in Boston and was the daughter of Captain John Clark and Mary Atwater. They had seven children:

1. Ebenezer (April 12, 1702 – July 6, 1702) died young. He was baptized on April 19.
2. Mary (April 14, 1703 – ?) married Hugh Vans (Note: Hugh Vans (1699 – 1763) was a Scottish-American merchant. Born in Ayr, Scotland, in 1699, he spent the early part of his career working for Sweden, producing the country's currency. He immigrated to Boston as a young adult, joining the Old South Church in 1728. Along with being a merchant he held several city committee positions, dealing with the Massachusetts General Court, trade, and currency. He married Mary Pemberton in 1726 and had four children, three sons and a daughter. He died in Boston in 1763.) (1699 – 1763) on August 17, 1726. They had one child together. Her death date is uncertain but has been estimated by the World Family Tree (WFT) to be anywhere between 1731 and 1799.
3. Ebenezer (February 6, 1705 – September 9, 1777) was a minister. He attended Harvard College on scholarships, graduating in 1721. He was appointed by Lieutenant Governor William Dummer as the chaplain of Castle William, known today as Fort Independence. In 1727, he was ordained minister of the First Presbyterian Church, then known as the Wall Street Church, in New York and served until 1753. He then moved in 1754 to the New Brick Church in Boston. Although he was associated with the New Brick Church until his death, he was a Tory and was alienated by his pupils in the years prior to the American Revolution. He chose to reside in Andover, Massachusetts, later in his life. He was a founder of the College of New Jersey, known today as Princeton University, and earned a Doctorate of Divinity there in 1770. He married three times, first to Catherine (Harris) Smith, who died June 13, 1751, second to Rebecca Smith on September 1, 1757, and third to Ann Powell (1723 – March 8, 1770), daughter of John Powell, on June 13, 1768.
4. Jane (November 15, 1706 – November 15, 1706)
5. John (January 25, 1708 – c. 1759) was a bookseller.
6. Samuel (May 3, 1710 – c. 1774) was born in Boston and died in Newport, Rhode Island. He is recorded to have lived in Newport in 1741. His first wife is unknown. They had two unidentified children. He had four children with his second wife, Mary Frye Leach (born December 16, 1713), including Ebenezer Pemberton, American educator and 2nd Principal of Phillips Academy.
7. A seventh child (? – ?) who died in infancy at an unknown date.

After Pemberton's death in 1718, Clark remarried to John Campbell, Postmaster of Boston and founder of the first regularly published newspaper in British America, The Boston News-Letter, on April 11, 1723. When he died on March 4, 1728, Clark remarried again to Henry Lloyd (Note: Henry Lloyd (November 28, 1685 – March 18, 1763) was a landowner out of Long Island, New York and sole owner of what is known now as Lloyd Neck. A manor called Queen's Village had been constructed on the property in 1685. Much of the neck today is part of Caumsett State Historic Park Preserve) of Long Island.

== Bibliography ==
- Lemay, J. A. Leo (2006). The Life of Benjamin Franklin. Vol. 1. Philadelphia: University of Pennsylvania Press. ISBN 9780812209112.
- Massachusetts Historical Society (1910). Massachusetts Historical Society Proceedings October 1909 - June 1910. Vol. 43. Boston: Massachusetts Historical Society.
- New England Historic Genealogical Society (1892). The New England Historical and Genealogical Register. Vol. 46. Boston: New England Historic Genealogical Society.
- Reno, Conrad (1901). Memoirs of the Judiciary and the Bar of New England for the Nineteenth Century with a History of the Judicial System of New England. Vol. 3. Boston: The Century Memorial Publishing Company.
- Shipton, Clifford K. (1933). Sibley's Harvard Graduates: Biographical Sketches of Those who Attended Harvard College in the Classes 1690-1700. Vol. 4. Cambridge, MA: Harvard University Press.
- Smith, Jerry (2000). "Descendants of James Pemberton". The Murray/Smith Genealogy Page. Jerry Smith. Archived from the original on 23 December 2018.
- Sprague, William B. (1857). Annals of the American Pulpit. Vol. 1. New York: Robert Carter and Brothers.
- Thompson, Benjamin F. (1843). The History of Long Island from its Discovery and Settlement to the Present Time. Vol. 1. New York: Gould, Banks & Co.
- Walker, Williston (1894). A History of the Congregational Churches in the United States. American Church History. Vol. 3. New York: The Christian Literature Company. ISBN 9780790542393.
- Weeks, Lyman Horace; Bacon, Edwin M. (1911). An Historical Digest of the Provincial Press. Vol. 1. Boston: The Society for Americana, Inc.
- Winslow, Anna Green (1894). Earle, Alice Morse (ed.). Diary of Anna Green Winslow: A Boston School Girl of 1771. Boston: Houghton, Mifflin and Company.
