= John Howe (loyalist) =

Loyalist printer (1754–1835)

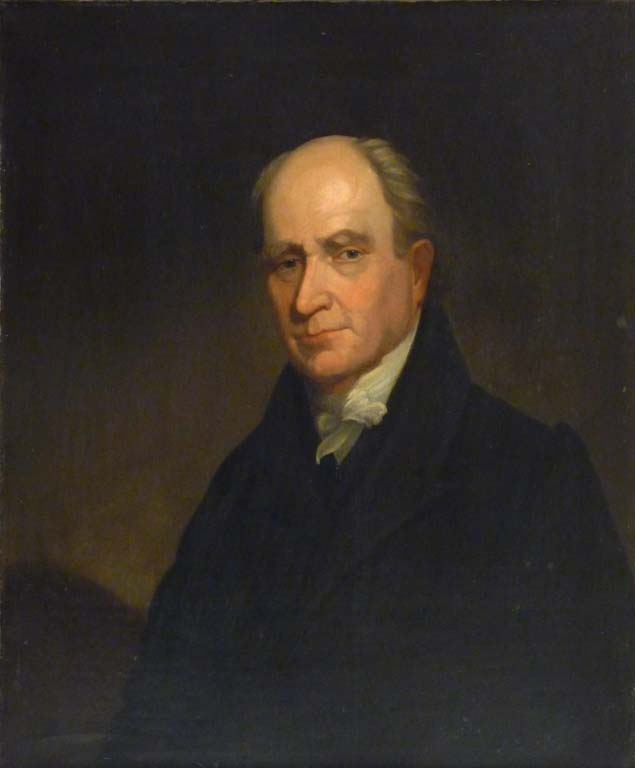
Portrait of John Howe, c. 1820, by William Valentine (painter). New Brunswick Museum, Saint John, N.B. (accession number: 1962.94).

John Howe (October 14, 1754 – December 27, 1835) was a loyalist printer during the American Revolution, a printer and Postmaster in Halifax, a spy prior to the War of 1812, and the father of Joseph Howe a Magistrate of the Colony of Nova Scotia. He was born in Boston, Massachusetts Bay Colony, the son of Joseph Howe, a tin plate worker of Puritan ancestry, and Rebeccah Hart.

== Early years ==
John Howe was born October 14th in 1754, the same year that the French and Indian War or Seven Years' War (1754–1763) began. It was the consequences of this conflict that required the British to demand greater taxes from, and assert greater control over, their American colonies and it was the consequences of this conflict that raised and disappointed the English-American colonists' expectations about their opportunities for expansion, all of which contributed to the colonists' determination to revolt against an increasingly costly, authoritarian, and obstructive British rule. John Howe was eight years old at the end of this war on September 7, 1763, so he grew to maturity influenced by the events that followed, such as colonial resistance to the Stamp Act (1765–66), when he was 11, and the violence of the Boston Massacre (1770), when he was 16, in which British troops opened fire on a mob of Bostonians who were brawling with the troops.

John Howe's family were converts to a religious sect called the Sandemanians, whose best-known member was Michael Faraday, the scientist. The sect began when the Rev. John Glas (1695–1773), who had been the Presbyterian minister at Tealing, Perthshire, Scotland, sought a return to a "New Testament Christianity" that included Agapēs, pacifism, good works, charity, communal property, as well as a strong opposition to state control over the church. These views led to his suspension from the Church of Scotland in 1728. With the help of his son-in-law, Robert Sandeman, the sect grew to several churches in Scotland and England. Sandeman first moved to London in 1760 and then, in 1764, to New England. He arrived in Boston, where he helped his nephew get established as a bookseller, and then moved to Danbury, Connecticut, where he lived until his death in April, 1771. Sandeman's teachings to live a more purely Christian life appealed to New England's Puritan descendants and, with the rising tensions between the colonists and royal rule, Sandman's command to "Fear God and honour the King" and "if it be possible...To live peacefully with all men" found a receptive audience amongst the loyalists. A Joseph Howe is listed as a member of the Boston Sandemanians; this was probably John's father, but it might have been John's elder brother. John Howe's Sandemanian beliefs likely contributed to his loyalist stance, and definitely contributed to his lifelong pacifism.

John Howe probably began his apprenticeship as a printer to Richard Draper in either 1766 or 1767. Richard Draper was the King's printer in Massachusetts and the publisher of the Massachusetts Gazette and Boston Weekly News Letter, the oldest English newspaper in the Americas. As Richard Draper was known to be a frail and sickly man, and as he was Draper's apprentice, John Howe probably witnessed and wrote the article about the Boston Tea Party that appeared in the December 23, 1773, issue. Less than six months after the report on the Boston Tea Party, Richard Draper, owner of the Massachusetts Gazette and Boston Weekly News Letter, died on June 5 or 6, 1774, leaving the paper in the hands of his widow, Margaret Draper. Richard Draper may have anticipated his demise, as he formed a partnership with John Boyle in May, the month before his death. However, Margaret Draper soon ended this partnership (between August 4 and 11, 1774) as Boyle did not share her loyalist sympathies. Margaret Draper published the paper by herself from August 11, 1774.

== A Loyalist printer in the American Revolution ==
On April 19, 1775, the opening battle of the American Revolution occurred when the British forces raided inland from Boston to Concord "to destroy a Magazine of Military Stores deposited there." When the raid broke into a firefight, the "Troops had above Fifty killed, and many more wounded". In the April 20, 1775, issue of the Massachusetts Gazette and Boston Weekly News Letter a short article appeared that briefly described the battle, and—a day or more later—a broadside was published that reported on the Battle of Lexington and Concord at greater length. Both were quite likely written and printed by John Howe, who would have been just a few months short of his 21st birthday. After the Battle of Lexington and Concord news of the event quickly spread to the other colonies and American patriots came in great numbers to lay siege to Boston. On June 17, 1775, the American forces seized a hill across the Charles river to the north of Boston in Charlestown and began building fortifications upon it from which they would be able to fire upon the town and harbour. In the morning light, a British ship in the harbour, seeing the fortifications being constructed on the hill, began firing on the hill. Soon, British troops were ferried from Boston to Charlestown, where they charged up and took the hill, although at an enormous cost in lives. John Howe witnessed, wrote, and printed the broadside describing the Battle of Bunker Hill. In later years, he described his experiences at the battle to his youngest son, Joseph, in which he watched as General Sir William Howe led the final bayonet charge up the hill "with the bullets flying through the tails of his coat." After the battle, John told of aiding "a young officer whose leg had been amputated and who he cured of a raging fever by letting him drink a bucket of cold water." Shortly after the battle, John Howe proposed to Martha Minns, who accepted and became his fiancée.

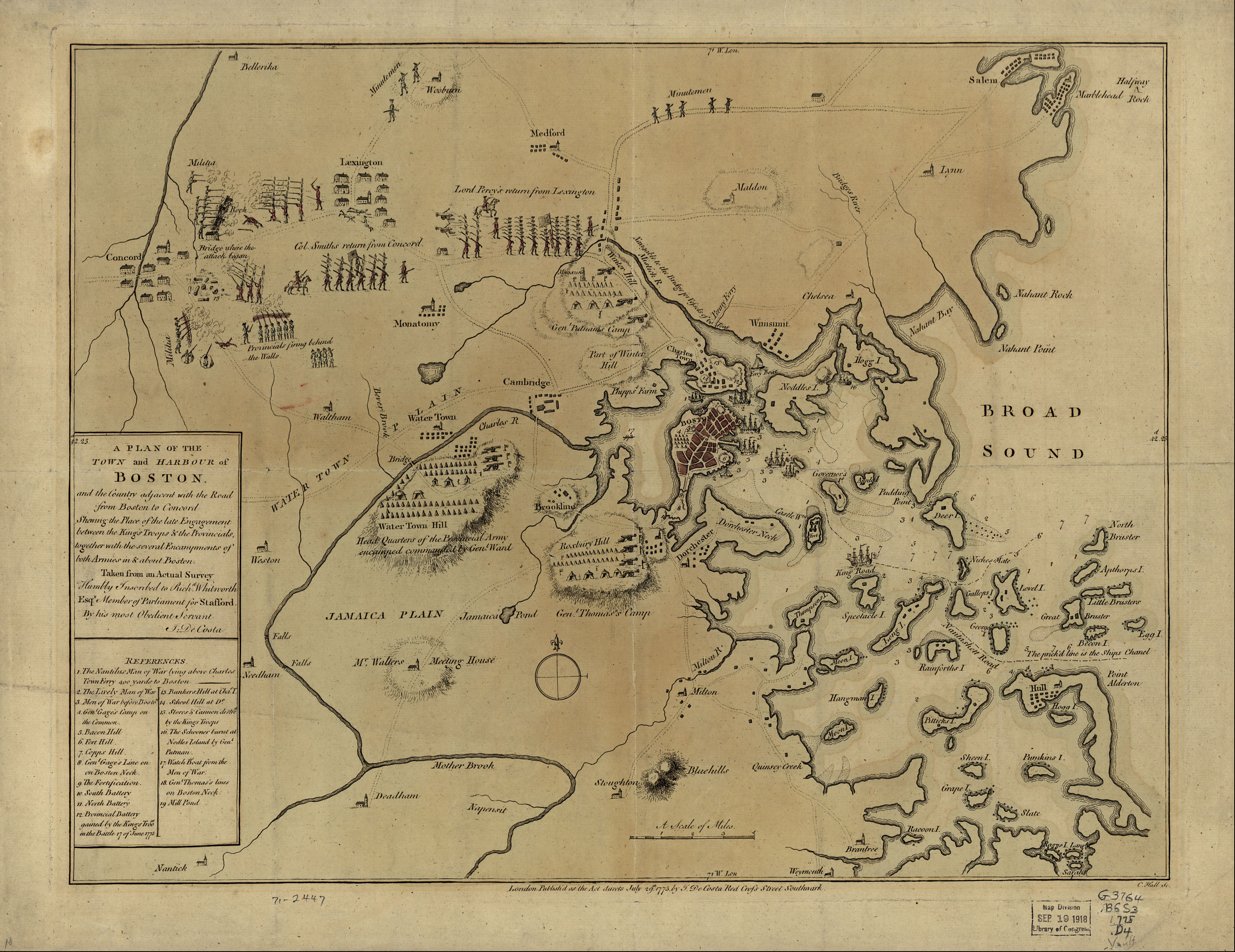
Battle of Lexington and Concord & Siege of Boston map

Margaret Draper continued to print the Massachusetts Gazette and Boston Weekly News Letter until September 7, 1775, when she appears to have had some trouble as no issues were published (or at least no issues have been found) from September 14 to October 6, 1775. John Howe, although he was just completing his apprenticeship, became Margaret Draper's new partner, and he was listed as the publisher from October 13, 1775 (the day before his 21st birthday, the time at which apprenticeships were completed in the practice of the time) to the paper's final issue on February 22, 1776.

On March 5, 1776, American forces seized control of Dorchester Heights, a hill to the south of Boston, with a commanding view of Boston harbour. Meanwhile, Henry Knox brought the cannon seized from Fort Ticonderoga to Boston. Realizing that taking the hill would be too costly, and that the Americans would soon have cannon in place, the British decided to evacuate the town of all of their forces and the loyalists. The two sides agreed upon an informal cease-fire proposed and negotiated by those in Boston who were staying: the Americans agreed because they feared the British would set fire to Boston as they left, the British agreed because they didn't want to suffer the costs of evacuating Boston under fire. On March 17, 1776, the last troops and loyalists boarded ships in Boston harbour and set sail for Halifax, Nova Scotia. Margaret Draper, John's partner in the Massachusetts Gazette and Boston Weekly News Letter, is listed as being amongst the loyalists evacuated from Boston to Halifax, and she was accompanied by John Howe. Margaret Draper then moved to England, where she lived on a pension from the British government.

In mid-1776, the British assembled troops on Staten Island. On August 22, they crossed over to Long Island, and on August 27, they engaged and defeated the Americans at the Battle of Long Island. A series of battles continued the New York Campaign, which was concluded with the British victory of Fort Washington on November 16, 1776. On November 26, General Clinton and 6,000 troops were sent to take Newport, RI, which they succeeded in doing on December 1. After this victory, the British offered John Howe the position of Printer for the Provincial Forces. John Howe moved to Newport, RI, along with his fiancée, Martha Minns, and her brother, William Minns. He printed the first issue of the Newport Gazette on January 16, 1777, and he continued printing that newspaper until the final issue of October 6, 1779. During their stay in Newport, John Howe married Martha Minns on June 7, 1778. John Howe was named in the Massachusetts Banishment Act of 1778, possibly as a result of his work as printer for the British forces in Newport, Rhode Island. During this period, John Howe took on John Ryan, a native of Newport, as his apprentice, who later became the printer of the first newspaper in New Brunswick and then the King's Printer in Newfoundland.

On October 26, 1779, the British evacuated their troops and the loyalists from Newport, RI, to New York. On Christmas Day, 1779, John and Martha Howe's first child, Martha Howe, was born in New York. Sometime during 1780, John Howe and his young family, along with his brother-in-law William Minns, quit New York for Halifax, Nova Scotia. John Ryan remained in New York until 1783, becoming a partner with William Lewis in the New-York Mercury and General Advertiser.

== Building a life in Halifax ==
On his return to Halifax, John Howe, published the first issue of the Halifax Journal on December 28, 1780. The paper remained in the Howe family until about 1819 and continued to be printed until about 1870. About half of the Halifax Journal was dedicated to foreign news and essays reprinted from European publications, there was a short Halifax section that covered shipping news and local events, and it reported on issues debated in the Assembly as well as laws and proclamations that were not covered in the Nova Scotia Royal Gazette. John Howe's printing was notable for its quality.

During this period, John Howe's and Martha (Minns) Howe's family grew and suffered losses. On September 2, 1782, their second child, Sarah Howe, was born, but she died at the age of 10 months on June 23, 1783. On September 8, 1784, John Howe, Jr., their third child, was born; in 1786 their fourth child, William Howe, was born; and in 1788, Jane Howe, their fifth child was born. On November 10, 1790, David Howe, John and Martha's sixth child was born, but Martha (Minns) Howe died of complications from the birth on November 25, 1790. On December 25, 1797, John and Martha (Minns) Howe's first child, Martha Howe, married Edward Sentell.

On October 25, 1798, John Howe married his second wife, Mary (Ede) Austen, the widow of Henry Austen. Only a few months later, on January 19, 1799, Martha (Howe) Sentell, the first child of John and Martha (Minns) Howe died in childbirth. But happier events followed with the birth of Sarah Foster Howe in 1800, John Howe's seventh child and his first with Mary (Ede Austen) Howe. On December 4, 1804, his last and best-known child, Joseph Howe, was born.

Meanwhile, after the death of Anthony Henry (printer), John was appointed King's Printer in 1801, responsible for printing the Nova Scotia Royal Gazette and the Debates of the House of Assembly. In the same year, he was also appointed Postmaster of Halifax and "agent manager and director of His Majesty's Packet boats in Halifax," a position that was extended to Deputy Postmaster-General of Nova Scotia, Cape Breton, Prince Edward Island, New Brunswick, and the Bermudas in 1803. The postmaster positions included expanding and improving delivery routes and establishing way stations as required.

== John Howe volunteers as a spy ==
Note other spying claims regarding a John Howe, denied in Dictionary of Canadian Biography Online, "Although he was not, as one writer states, the John Howe who acted as a spy for Lieutenant-General Thomas Gage behind the rebel lines in 1775..."

In 1803, as part of the British blockade of trade with French-controlled ports, which was during the Napoleonic Wars, the Royal Navy searched American ships trading with continental Europe and impressed sailors onboard that were alleged to be British deserters. In June, 1807, HMS Leopard fired several shots on USS Chesapeake when the latter refused to submit to a search attempt. Fearing that these events presaged war, Sir George Prevost, the Lieutenant Governor of Nova Scotia, arranged for a spy to tour the New England states and "observe whatever may be agitating." The man he chose for his spy was John Howe.

Howe traveled through the American seaboard states, arriving in Boston on April 22, 1808, under the guise of visiting family and friends. He travelled from Boston to Washington, Norfolk, and New York. He reported on the political situation, predicted that Madison would be the next President, stated that there were French emissaries throughout the country, commented on the anti-British sentiment of Irish immigrants in New York, and assessed the state of military preparedness. John Howe subsequently made a trip to the United States from November 10, 1808, to January 5, 1809, but this visit was under the more official guise of "bearer of Dispatches to the British Minister", that minister being David Montagu, Baron Erskine of Restormel Castle, the British Envoy at Washington from 1806 to 1810. This mission included accompanying Baron Erskine to interviews with President Thomas Jefferson and President-elect James Madison. John Howe concluded that war with the United States could be avoided if the British blockade and tariff on ships entering French ports (which was having a devastating effect on the American economy) were rescinded, but if they were not, war was probably unavoidable and attacks on the British North American colonies were likely. When Madison declared war on Britain, beginning the War of 1812, he cited the British Orders in Council which established the blockade and tariff, just as John Howe had predicted, and attacks on the British North American colonies (later Canada) did occur.

For these services, Joseph Howe said ruefully, his father "never received a farthing."

== John Howe's later years ==
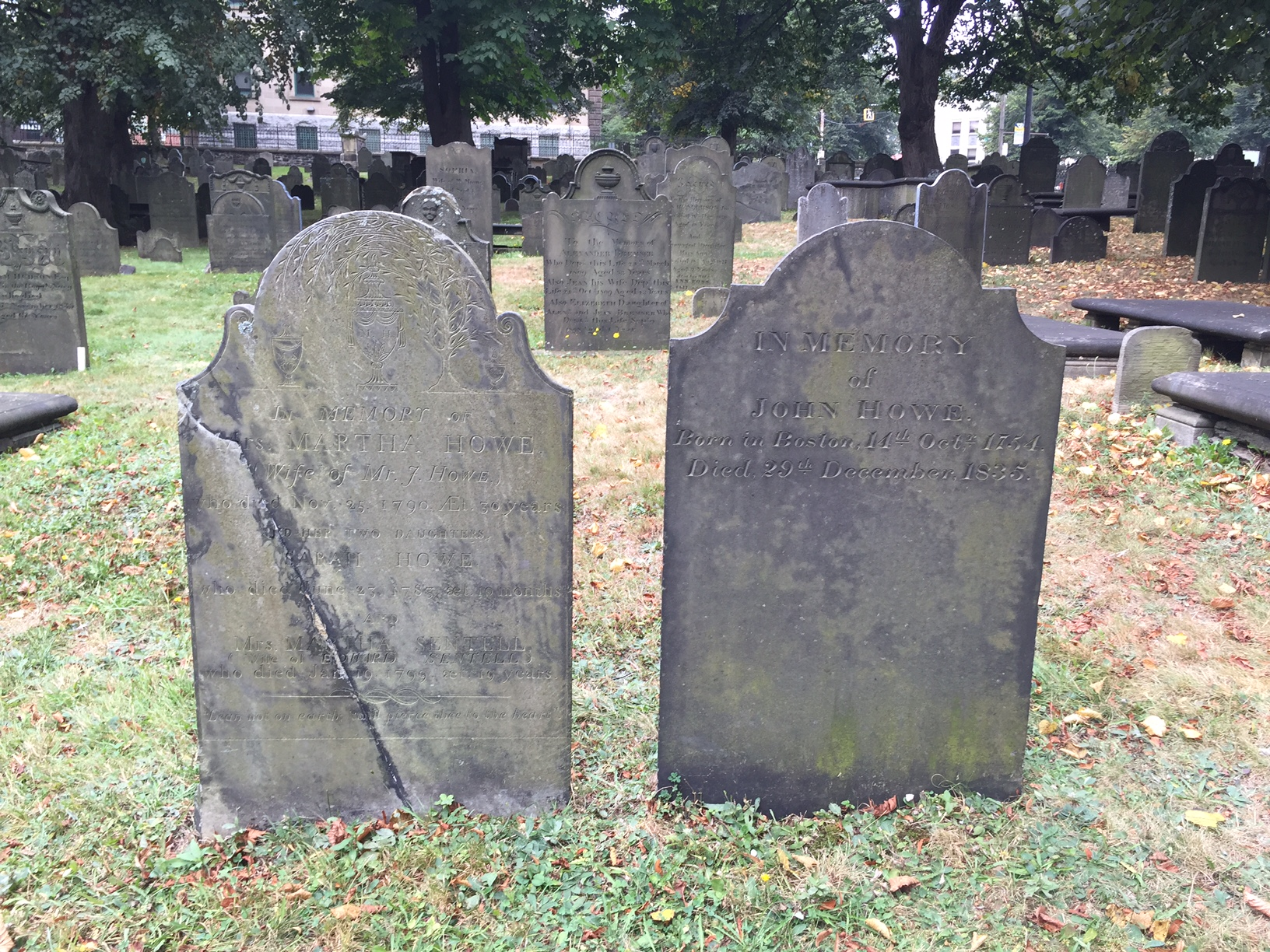
John and Mary Howe, Old Burying Ground (Halifax, Nova Scotia)

After his brief stint as a volunteer spy, John returned to his usual work as printer, loyalist writer and postmaster in Halifax. On October 16, 1808, John Howe's eldest son, John Howe, Jr., married Henrietta Hians. In 1810, John Howe was appointed Justice of the Peace and Justice of the Inferior Court of Common Pleas. On October 9, 1813, his sixth and youngest child from his first marriage, David Howe, married Elizabeth M. Gethens. In 1815, John Howe was given a special commission as Justice "for the better and more effective administration of the office of Justice of the Peace and for the establishment of an active, vigorous and effectual Police." John Howe played a role in the establishment of a "House of Correction" and improving the police in Halifax by having "the daily attendance of one Magistrate in some Public Office in Halifax, for managing the Police of the Town." With his growing duties as a Magistrate and possibly due to a minor stroke, John Howe retired from his offices as King's Printer and Postmaster in 1818, appointments that were then awarded to his son, John Howe, Jr.

As mentioned, John Howe was a religious man and a convert to the Sandemanian church. In Halifax, John served as an elder of the Sandemanian church, he served as a lay preacher to the community of 2000 blacks that fled the United States during the War of 1812 and settled in Halifax, and he made regular Sunday visits to the prison to preach to the inmates. He was a practicing pacifist, yet on at least one occasion he knocked together the heads of two young men who were fighting on the Sabbath.

After his retirement from his offices of King's Printer and Postmaster, John Howe continued to be active, serving as a magistrate. In 1822, Sarah Foster Howe, John's seventh child, married Daniel Langshaw, but in 1824, Sarah Foster (Howe) Langshaw died aboard ship on her way from Liverpool, England, to Lima, Peru, where she was planning to move with her husband. In 1826, John Howe's sixth child, David Howe, also died. But another family event followed on February 2, 1828, when Joseph Howe, John Howe's youngest child, married Catherine Susan Ann McNab. After this marriage, John Howe helped to produce his son's, Joseph Howe's, newspaper together with Joseph's wife, particularly when Joseph traveled.

Howe was a serving magistrate when his youngest son, Joseph Howe, was charged with criminal libel for printing an anonymous letter that charged that the police and magistrates had embezzled £30,000 from the people of Halifax. Joseph Howe made it clear that his father was not one of the corrupt magistrates when he argued his own defense. Joseph won an acquittal in the case on March 3, 1835, in a victory that was popularly seen as a triumph of freedom of the press and a blow to the corrupt governance of some of the magistrates. Just over eight months after Joseph won his case, but before Joseph had begun his political career, John Howe died in his sleep on December 27, 1835, at 81 years of age. He is buried in the Old Burying Ground.

== See also ==
- C.D. Howe - distant relation to Howe
