= John Campbell (editor) =

American publisher and editor (1653–1728)

- Coat of arms of Campbell
- Born: c. 1653; Scotland
- Died: March 4, 1728 (aged 74–75); Boston, Province of Massachusetts Bay, British America
- Occupations: Publisher; editor
- Known for: Founder of The Boston News-Letter
- Spouse: Mary Clark (m. 1723)

John Campbell (c. 1653 – March 4, 1728) was an early American newspaper publisher and editor and Postmaster of Boston. He founded the first regularly published newspaper in British America, The Boston News-Letter.

== Biography ==
Campbell was one of a family or kin of Boston booksellers and public officials whose relationships are not determinable. He arrived in Boston some time before 1698, and in 1702 was appointed postmaster, under Neale's monopoly, with the "approbation" of Governor Dudley. The General Court subsidized the post-office at first and in 1703 Campbell was not required to fulfill various civic duties during term as postmaster. As postmaster, he was the news center of the New England provinces, and in 1703 was writing "news letters" of European news to Governor Fitz-John Winthrop of Connecticut, and perhaps to other governors, made up of information received from arriving travelers, etc., with inferences as to New England policy.

In 1704, he decided to make these news items public and for sale; and on April 24 issued the first newspaper in America, The Boston News-Letter, which he edited until 1722. It was not the first attempt at a newspaper, but it was the first to become an established concern.

In 1719, he was deprived of the postmaster position. He was justice of the peace in Suffolk County for some years.

In April 1723, he married Mary Clark, who was previously married to Ebenezer Pemberton until his death in 1717. After Campbell's death in 1728, she married a third time to Henry Lloyd of Long Island.

== See also ==
- List of early American publishers and printers

== Bibliography ==
- This article incorporates text from a publication now in the public domain: Rines, George Edwin, ed. (1920). "Campbell, John, American editor" . Encyclopedia Americana.
- Thomas, Isaiah (1874). The history of printing in America, with a biography of printers. Vol. I. New York, B. Franklin.
- Matteson, David M. (1943). Johnson, Allen (ed.). Dictionary of American biography. Charles Scribner's Sons.
- Wroth, Lawrence C. (1938). The Colonial Printer. Portland, Me., The Southworth-Anthoensen press.
- Weeks, Lyman Horace; Bacon, Edwin M. (1911). An Historical Digest of the Provincial Press. Vol. 1. Boston: The Society for Americana, Inc.
