= John Ryan (printer) =

John Ryan (7 October 1761 – 30 September 1847) was a loyalist printer.

Sometime between 1776 and 1780 he became an apprentice to John Howe, in Newport, Rhode Island. John Ryan married Amelia Mott on 22 November 1781 in New York City. He remained in New York until 1783, becoming a partner with William Lewis in the New-York Mercury and General Advertiser.

== Career ==
- 1777-1779
  - An apprentice to John Howe on the Newport Gazette
- 1783
  - Partner with William Lewis in New-York Mercury; and General Advertiser in New York City.
- 18 December 1783
  - Partner with William Lewis in publishing Royal St. John's Gazette, and Nova-Scotia Intelligencer in Parrtown (later Saint John, New Brunswick); the first newspaper in New Brunswick. His relationship with William Lewis dissolved and the publication underwent a name change in 1786 to the St. John Gazette, and Weekly Advertiser with John Ryan as the publisher.
- 1799
  - Acquired the Royal Gazette from Christopher Sower and sold St. John Gazette to Jacob S. Mott.
- 27 Aug 1807 – 1830s
  - Publisher of Newfoundland's first newspaper Royal Gazette and Newfoundland Advertiser, in St. John's, Newfoundland. Took on his son Michael Ryan as partner.
- 1833–1835
  - Published, in partnership with John Collier Withers, Journal of the Legislative Council of Newfoundland
- 1836–1841
  - Published, in partnership with John Collier Withers, Journal of His Majesty's Council of Newfoundland

== Family ==
John Ryan and Amelia Mott had seven children:

- Michael Ryan - printer of the New Brunswick Chronicle (Jan - Aug 1804), the Fredericton Telegraph (Aug 1806 - Feb 1807) and the Globe in Barbados.
- Lewis Kelly Ryan - publisher of Newfoundland Sentinel, and General Commercial Register
- Robert B. Ryan
- Ingraham Ryan
- John Ryan Jr
- Mary Somerindyke Ryan
- Sarah Maghee Ryan
- Leah Ryan

== Printing as a Family Endeavor ==
In her book, Maudie Whelan cites W.N. Glascock as having a first-hand account of printing in Newfoundland. It is likely that Glascock is referring to the Ryan family here:

Notwithstanding that newspapers in this colony are saleable without being subject to any duty, it would appear that the profits, arising from that of even the most extensive circulation, are no more than competent to the maintenance of a family. In the instance alluded to, the various departments of exertion left no individual, young or old, male or female, unoccupied. The father took the literary lead, and wrote the leading article; the son-in-law (a half-pay purser in the navy) sometimes sported a quiet quill on a little quackery in political economy; the mother, not having much pretensions to letters, except in type (for she could assist as compositor at a pinch), collected and arranged little receipts for preserves, pickling, and pretty progeny; whilst the daughters, who were spinsters, professing total ignorance of the mystery of the latter composition, confined their talents to aiding in the composition of type, and correcting the press, which usually went on during the hour of tea, when every avowed contributor considered himself a privileged guest.

== More Reading ==
- Davies, Gwendolyn (2012). "New Brunswick Loyalist Printers in the Post-war Atlantic World: Cultural Transfer and Cultural Challenges". In Bannister, Jerry; Riordan, Liam (eds.). The Loyal Atlantic: Remaking the British Atlantic in the Revolutionary Era. Toronto: University of Toronto Press. ISBN 9781442642089.
