= Gobi (dog) =

Dog that followed runner Dion Leonard on the 2016 Gobi Desert Run

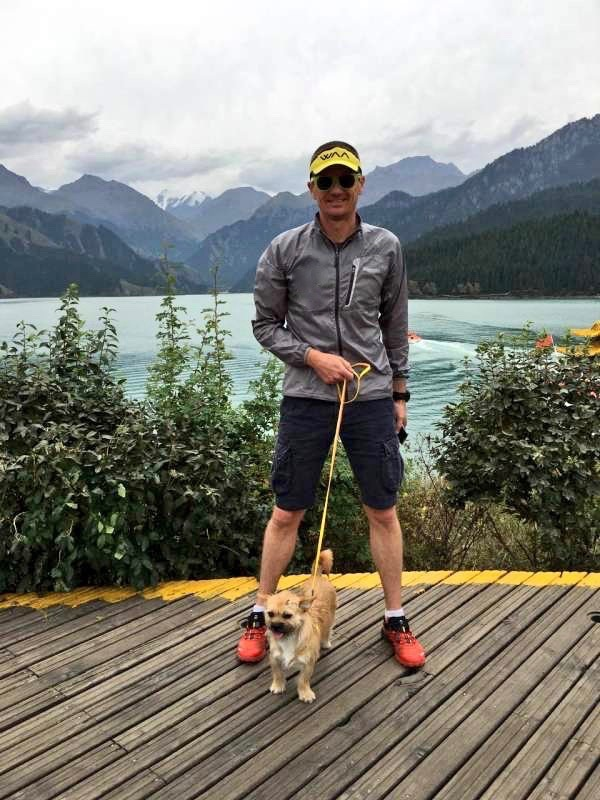
Dion and Gobi at Heavenly Lake, near Urumqi, China.

Gobi is a small, female Chihuahua mix that began following ultra marathon runner Dion Leonard at the beginning of day II of the Gobi Desert Run in China in June 2016.

== 2016 Gobi Desert Run ==
On day one of the week long 155-mile (249 km) desert race across the Gobi Desert a stray dog joined runners and completed 18 miles (29 km) of the stage. Leonard noticed the stray dog at the start of the second day of the race. He did not expect the dog to follow him. The dog ran the 25-mile (40 km) second stage of the race with him. At the end of the day, the dog joined Leonard in his tent. On Day three, the dog ran the 26-mile (42 km) stage and would receive the name Gobi from the desert the race was held. During stage three, Leonard carried Gobi several times through water barriers. Gobi did not run Stages four and five of the run, as the race had entered the desert where temperatures exceeded 52 °C (126 °F). Gobi completed the final 8-mile (13 km) stage with Leonard to finish the race with him. Ultimately, Gobi ran 77 miles (124 km) of the 155-mile (249 km) race.

After finishing the race, Leonard began a crowd funding campaign to raise £5,000 to bring Gobi back to Edinburgh from China. The campaign ultimately raised over £38,000. Leonard and his wife Lucja committed to donate the extra funds to welfare organizations that care for stray dogs.

Before Gobi could begin the quarantine process necessary to enter the UK, Leonard left Gobi in the care of race organisers in Urumqi, while he flew back to the UK to arrange for a leave of absence from his job in Edinburgh. While Leonard was in Edinburgh Gobi went missing, so Leonard immediately flew back to Urumqi, a city of three million people, to find her. With a search party made up of volunteers, Leonard combed the city with reward flyers and social media until the dog was found. Gobi had a deep gash on her head and was limping, but was otherwise unharmed. Leonard used some of the crowd funding money to fly Gobi to Beijing for an operation on her hip, from which she recovered. Leonard brought Gobi home to Edinburgh after the four month quarantine in Beijing required by UK law for unregistered strays was completed by January 5, 2017.

== Media and Publications ==
In October 2016, HarperCollins Publishers announced the expected publication of a trilogy of books about Gobi's and Leonard's journey together. The book titled Finding Gobi, received favourable high praise in Publishers Weekly and other reviews. The paperback version was officially launched in the US on June 1, 2017, and went onto become a New York Times Bestseller at number 3. The hardback version was released in the UK, Australia and New Zealand on June 13, 2017, reaching The Sunday Times Bestseller List. This was followed by a paperback version later released in February 2018 also reaching The Sunday Times Bestseller List. The main edition version is now available in 24 languages: English, Spanish, Dutch, Polish, Italian, Japanese, German, Finnish, Swedish, Danish, Portuguese, Simplified Chinese, Chinese Traditional, Korean, French, Vietnamese, Hungarian, Bulgarian, Croatian, Slovene, Russian, Serbian, Romanian and Czech.

A chapter book edition for young adults (Finding Gobi: The True Story of One Little Dog's Big Journey) and a children's picture book (Gobi: A Little Dog with a Big Heart) was also released in 2017. The chapter book, young adult edition won the 2017 New York City Big Book Award.

In 2024 a new picture book was released titled 'Where's Gobi' Seek and Find.

In February 2017, Irish singer and songwriter Fiona Kennedy released a song titled "Gobi" in her album, 'The Beach'.

In June 2020, the podcast This is Love covered Dion and Gobi's story in their episode, "Gobi."

On March 13, 2017, Twentieth Century Fox announced that it was developing a movie based on Dion Leonard and Gobi's extensive journey together.

On February 20, 2021, it was announced that Sony Pictures and Tencent Films had purchased the rights from Fox.

== Awards and Accolades ==
In June 2017, Gobi was invited with Leonard to present Gold Duke of Edinburgh Awards at Holyrood Palace alongside Prince Edward, Earl of Wessex.

In September 2017, Gobi won the Inspiring Animal Hero Award held at the Grosvenor Hotel in London. The Animal Hero Awards recognise and celebrate the most inspiring examples of bravery, dedication and resilience in the animal world.

In September 2019, Gobi was invited with Leonard by the President of Slovenia to the Open Gala Day to speak to invited guests about their story of Finding Gobi.

In June 2020, Gobi won the Shining World Marathon Award from the Supreme Master Ching Hai. The award recognises Gobi's heroic and noble example of unconditional selfless love to humankind.

In December 2020, Gobi won the Dog Of The Year award in a special feature television program named Dogs Of The Year broadcast by The CW network. Gobi's story was number 1 of the 10 dogs featured.

In September 2023, Leonard received an award at the 26th Fervent Global Love of Lives for his story with Gobi. As part of the event Leonard was invited to meet Tsai Ing-wen.
