= The Boston News-Letter =

First newspaper in British North America (1704–1776)

Boston News-Letter
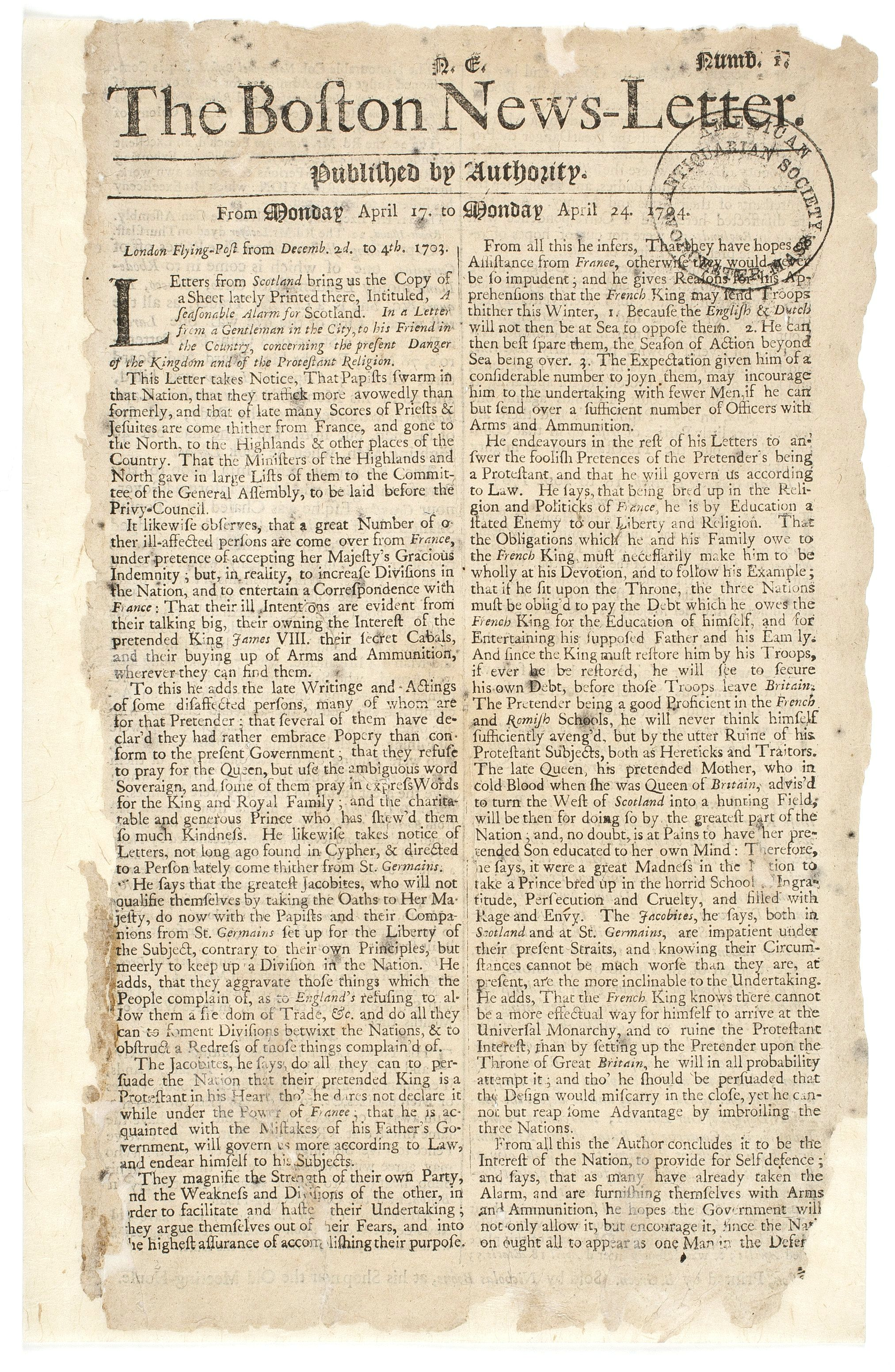
- The Boston News-Letter, first issue (See also: Page 2)
- Type: Weekly newspaper
- Format: Broadsheet
- Editor: John Campbell (1704–1722); Bartholomew Green, Jr. (1722–1732); Margaret Green Draper (1774–1776)
- Founded: April 24, 1704; 322 years ago
- Ceased publication: February 29, 1776; 250 years ago
- Political alignment: British Crown
- Language: English
- Headquarters: (Province of Massachusetts Bay) Boston, Massachusetts

The Boston News-Letter, first published on April 24, 1704, is regarded as the first continuously published newspaper in the colony of Massachusetts. It was heavily subsidized by the British government, with a limited circulation. All copies were approved by the Royal governor before publication. The colonies’ first newspaper was Publick Occurrences Both Forreign and Domestick, which published its first and only issue on September 25, 1690. The Weekly Jamaica Courant followed in Kingston, Jamaica from 1718. In 1726 the Boston Gazette began publishing, with Bartholomew Green, Jr. as printer.

== History ==
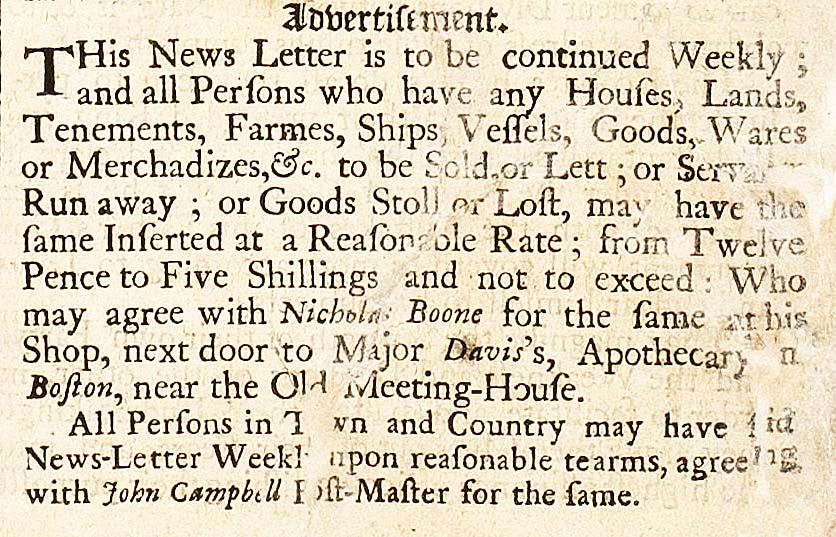
The premier edition of the News-Letter (April 24, 1704, page 2) contained what is believed to be the first newspaper classified ad in America.

The News-Letter’s first editor was John Campbell, a bookseller and postmaster of Boston. Campbell had been actively writing and sending "newsletters" of European occurrences to New England governors for a year or more and thought it would save trouble to print them for all. The News-Letter was originally issued weekly as a half sheet, a single page printed on both sides, 8 by 12 inches (200 mm × 300 mm), dated "From Monday, April 17, to Monday, April 24, 1704." The printer was Bartholomew Green.

During its early years, the News-Letter was filled primarily with news from London journals describing English politics and the details of European wars. As the only newspaper in the colonies at the time, it also reported on the sensational death of Blackbeard the pirate in hand-to-hand combat in 1718.

In 1707, John Allen took care of printing the paper. In 1722 the editorship passed to Green, who focused more on domestic events. After his death in 1732, his son-in-law John Draper, also a printer, took the paper's helm. He enlarged the paper to four pages and filled it with news from throughout the colonies. He conducted the paper until his death in 1762, at which time his son, Richard Draper, became the editor. Richard died in 1774, and his widow, Margaret Green Draper, published the News-Letter for the rest of its existence.

In 1768, as the controversies between the American colonies and Britain were mounting, Richard Draper merged The Massachusetts Gazette with The Boston Post-Boy, which began functioning as a Tory newspaper that gave voice to the Loyalist views. At this time the royal colonial government directed Draper to include the inscription "Published by Authority" in the Gazette's heading.

Richard Draper had been an ardent loyalist and firmly supported Britain during the controversies among the colonies during the 1770s. His widow had shared his feelings, and when the young man she installed as editor, Robert Boyle, showed sympathy with the Revolution, she replaced him with John Howe. Howe served as Mrs. Draper's editor until the British evacuated Boston on March 17, 1776, taking John Howe and Margaret Draper with them. With the British withdrawal, the News-Letter ceased to exist. The British government gave Margaret Draper a life pension.

== Varying titles ==
- The Boston news-letter. April 24, 1704 – December 29, 1726.
- The Weekly news-letter. January 5, 1727 – October 29, 1730.
- The Boston weekly news-letter. November 5, 1730 – August 25, 1757.
- The Boston news-letter. September 1, 1757 – March 18, 1762.
- The Boston news-letter, and New-England chronicle. March 25, 1762 – March 31, 1763.
- The Massachusetts gazette. And Boston news-letter. April 7, 1763 – May 19, 1768.
- Boston weekly news-letter. May 26, 1768 – September 21, 1769.
- The Massachusetts gazette; and the Boston weekly news-letter. September 28, 1769 – February 29, 1776.
