= List of newspapers in Jamaica =

This is a list of newspapers in Jamaica:

- Daily Star
- The Daily Gleaner, the oldest Jamaican daily published by Gleaner Company, founded in 1834, oldest continually published, English language newspaper in the Western Hemisphere
- The Agriculturalist, the oldest and most consistent agricultural newspaper in the Caribbean for 28 years. Published by Patrick Maitland
- The Jamaica Churchman OCLC 63206121
- Jamaica Herald
- Jamaica Information Service (JIS), information and news service of the Jamaican Government
- Jamaica Observer, Jamaican daily
- The Jamaica Star (1951–present), Jamaican daily
- Jamaican Times
- Royal Gazette
- Western Mirror

== Defunct newspapers ==
- Jamaica despatch, and Kingston chronicle ceased between 1839 and 1841, OCLC 18324191
- Jamaica Courant, OCLC 793908775
- Abeng, weekly newspaper published in 1969
- Daily News, daily newspaper published from May 1973 to April 1983
- Weekly Jamaica Courant, weekly newspaper published in Kingston, Jamaica, 1718‍–‍1755

== See also ==
- List of newspapers

== Bibliography ==
- Aggrey Brown (1990). "Mass Media in Jamaica". In Stuart H. Surlin; Walter C. Soderlund (eds.). Mass Media and the Caribbean. New York: Gordon and Breach. pp. 11–28. ISBN 978-2-88124-447-6.
