= Michael Ryan (printer) =

Michael Ryan (23 June 1784 – September 1830) was one of seven children born to John Ryan (who has been styled the "Father of the Press in British North America"), and Amelia Mott. Michael Ryan likely learned his trade as a printer, publisher, and editor at his father's feet. Early on in his career as a printer, he started two short-lived newspapers in Fredericton and Saint John, New Brunswick. After the failure of these two papers, he worked briefly as a partner with his father on the first newspaper in Newfoundland. Likely eager to go off on his own he proposed a second paper for Newfoundland and was denied. Shortly after this he left Newfoundland for the Caribbean and edited, published and printed newspapers in Antigua and Barbados.

== Career ==
From January to August 1804, Ryan was editor and publisher of the New Brunswick Chronicle, described as, "This rather colourless newspaper was the first attempt of a young man in the publishing business. It carried a small amount of local news, foreign news copied from English papers, some dull literary articles, and a few poems mostly extracted from other newspapers."

From August 1806 to February 1807, he was printer, publisher, and editor of the Fredericton Telegraph, the first newspaper published in Fredericton. Also in 1807 he was co-publisher, with John Ryan, of the Royal Gazette and Newfoundland Advertizer

In 1810 he proposed but was denied a new publication in Newfoundland to be called The Commercial Register.

From 1812 to 1813 he was editor of the Antigua Journal.

In 1814 he was editor of the Barbados Times.

From 1818 to around 1828, Ryan was publisher and editor of the Barbados Globe and Demerara Advocate in Barbados. In 1820, he was appointed printer to the House of Assembly for Barbados.

== Controversy ==
On 25 February 1819, the Governor of Barbados, Lord Cobermere, was promoting the "Society for Promoting Christian Knowledge", and in order to improve donations he arranged for the second day of Lent (1819) to be a day for everyone to attend service and hear a sermon on charity. To lend pomp and circumstance to the proceedings he called on the Militia to parade in the square on this occasion. Ryan objected to this misuse of the Militia and wrote the following:

Some, we are well aware (by the way of finesse) may say, that we aim at creating insubordination in the regiment. To this we answer, No! it is only to oppose oppression and resist a system of tyranny, which, according to our interpretation, are not sanctioned by custom or law. The militia of this island, as well as that of almost every other, was not organized to dance attendance to those who delight in a red coat; it was embodied for the protection of the country and its laws.

On 12 May 1819, Ryan was arrested in Bridgetown, Barbados "for the sum of five thousand pounds, and bail demanded for double the amount". On 10 June 1819, he was indicted for "endeavouring to sow sedition and insubordination in the royal regiment of militia, and for libelling the Government of the Island." The verdict was not guilty. He was then "carried in triumph through the streets, and that two gentlemen [including Cheeseman Moe] belonging to the commission of the peace assisted in these demonstrations of joy."

== Family ==
Michael Ryan married Mary Ann Morphy 17 May 1817 in Bridgetown, Barbados in the parish of St. Michael.
