= The Gleaner =

Jamaican newspaper

Coordinates: 17.976344°N 76.788479°W

- The Gleaner, 29 July 2013
- Type: Daily newspaper
- Format: Broadsheet
- Owner: Gleaner Company
- Founder(s): Joshua and Jacob De Cordova
- Founded: 13 September 1834; 192 years ago
- Language: English
- Headquarters: 148–156 Harbour Street, Kingston, Jamaica
- City: Kingston
- Country: Jamaica
- ISSN: 0259-0336
- OCLC number: 18321104
- Website: jamaica-gleaner.com

The Gleaner is a national daily publication in Jamaica, founded by two brothers, Jacob and Joshua de Cordova on 13 September 1834 in Kingston, Jamaica.

Originally called The Daily Gleaner, the name was changed on 7 December 1992 to The Gleaner. The newspaper is owned and published by Gleaner Company publishing house in Kingston, Jamaica. The Gleaner is still considered a newspaper of record for Jamaica.

== History ==
The Gleaner is the oldest continuously published newspaper in the Western Hemisphere—operating since 1834, and is a newspaper of record for Jamaica in the 21st century.

The morning broadsheet newspaper is presently published six days each week in Kingston. The Sunday paper edition is called the Sunday Gleaner. The Sunday edition was first published in 1939, and it reaches twice as many readers as the daily paper. The influence, particularly historically, of the newspaper is so large that "Gleaner" has become synonymous in Jamaica for "newspaper".

The Gleaner contains regular sub-sections and features the following:

- Western Focus providing for the needs of the people living in the five western parishes; this special edition carries news, features, and advertisements from those parishes.
- The Flair Magazine is designed to address topics of concern to women.
- The Financial Gleaner is for the business and financial community.
- Youthlink is a magazine addressing educational and other issues of concerns to the youth and highlighting their achievements.

Overseas weekly editions of The Gleaner are published in Canada, the United Kingdom and the United States. The Weekly Gleaner in the United Kingdom carries news of interest to the West Indians in United Kingdom. The paper offers coverage of important issues and events in both the Caribbean and the United Kingdom. The current Editor-in-Chief of The Gleaner is Kaymar Jordan.

== See also ==
- List of newspapers in Jamaica
