= Margaret Green Draper =

American printer and journalist

- Born: May 3, 1727; Boston, Massachusetts
- Died: c. 1804; London
- Occupation: Printer

Margaret Green Draper (May 3, 1727 – c. 1804) was an American printer and journalist. She was the great-granddaughter of pioneering American printer Samuel Green. She was one of the first American women to run an independent business. A United Empire Loyalist, she supported the British monarchy during the American Revolutionary War.

== Biography ==
Draper was born on May 3, 1727. On May 30, 1750, she married her cousin Richard Draper. They had no children, but adopted one of Margaret’s nieces. Richard died on June 6, 1774, and Margaret took over the Loyalist paper The Massachusetts Gazette and The Boston News-Letter. Six of her competitors were driven out of business during her tenure at the paper. Following the Siege of Boston, Draper and other Loyalists left for Halifax, Nova Scotia, on March 17, 1776 (Evacuation Day). She then went to England where she successfully petitioned the British government for a pension.

She died in London, c. 1804.
