= Donald J. Leonard =

American businessman

Donald J. Leonard (born July 11, 1933) is an American electrical engineer and AT&T executive, who received the 1996 IEEE Simon Ramo Medal.

== Biography ==
Born in New York City, Leonard studied Electrical Engineering at the New York University in the 1950s, where he received his BEE in 1956 and his MEE in 1960.

After graduation, Leonard started his career as a researcher at the New York University Research Lab. After working for the New York Telephone Company, he joined AT&T Bell labs in 1956. Here he started his lifelong career at AT&T, working on the development of the Transmission System 1 (T-1), which was introduced by Bell Labs in 1962. He later supervised the development of a pulse-code modulation for the Telstar.

In 1963, he moved to Bell Labs in Merrimack Valley, where he was director of the Transmission Technology Laboratory from 1968 to 1970. In 1970, he moved to Indianapolis to direct the Telephone Laboratory. From 1977 to 1980 in Columbus, he was executive director of Crossbar and Switching Operations, and from 1980 to 1982 at Western Electric, he was vice president of Corporate Engineering. In 1982, he returned to Bell Labs, where he succeeded William O. Fleckenstein as vice president, Switching Systems, and where in 1991 he was appointed vice president, Quality, Technology, and Process Research. In 1994, he retired and was succeeded by Arun Netravali.

Leonard was awarded an honorary doctorate from Midwest College of Engineering; the Hispanic Engineer National Achievement Award in 1992 by the Society of Hispanic Professional Engineers; and in 1996 the IEEE Simon Ramo Medal for his "engineering leadership in design and development of intelligent networks, digital electronic switching, transmission and signaling systems, and network databases." In 1997 he was awarded an EMMY by the Academy of Television Arts and Sciences for his work on high-definition TV.

== Selected publications ==
- Andre, S. N. and Leonard, D. J., “An Active Retrodirective Array for Satellite Communication”, Trans. IEEE, Vol. AP-12, Mar. 1964, pp. 181–186.
- Donald J. Leonard. "Local switching: on the leading edge of technology", Bell Laboratories Record. Vol. 60. (7). September 1982. pp. 181–184.

== Patents ==
- Leonard, Donald J. "RELEASED." U.S. Patent No. 3,030,448. 17 Apr. 1962.
- Leonard, Donald J. "Elimination of talk-off in in-band signaling systems." U.S. Patent No. 3,306,984. 28 Feb. 1967.
