= Jacob De Cordova =

American politician

Jacob Raphael De Cordova
- Born: Jacob Raphael de Cordova; 6 June 1808; Spanish Town, Colony of Jamaica
- Died: 26 January 1868 (aged 59); Texas, US
- Occupation: Texas House of Representatives

Jacob Raphael De Cordova (6 June 1808 – 26 January 1868) was the founder of the Jamaica Gleaner. He settled in Texas in 1839 and lived in Galveston. After living in Galveston, De Cordova moved to Houston, Texas, where he was elected to the Texas House of Representatives to the second Texas Legislature in the year 1847.

== Biography ==
=== Early Times ===
Jacob Raphael de Cordova was born in Spanish Town (near Kingston), Jamaica, on 6 June 1808, the youngest of three sons of Judith and Raphael de Cordova, a coffee brewer and grower, who were British Jews of Spanish descent. His father was relatively wealthy and had been left £1,000 in a will dated 1794 from his father (worth £115,022 in 2025). The de Cordova family were implicated in the trans-Atlantic slave trade and slavery in Jamaica; according to the 1812 Jamaica Almanac at his Sandysbury Grove Plantation, Saint Catherine Parish, de Cordova's Amsterdam-born grandfather Raphael de Cordova owned 60 enslaved Black African people.

Since his mother died at his birth, he was raised by an aunt in England. He was well educated and became proficient in English, French, Spanish, German and Hebrew. He soon moved to Philadelphia to join his father. In 1829, he married a young woman named Rebecca Sterling, the daughter of pioneers. In 1834, Jacob moved back to Kingston, where he and his brother Joshua started a newspaper, The Gleaner, which is still published today. In early 1836, Jacob went to New Orleans, where he shipped cargoes of staples to Texas during its struggle for independence. At this time he served a term as Grand Master of the Odd Fellows. After the Battle of San Jacinto he visited the Republic of Texas to install members in the Odd Fellows lodges, the first established outside the United States.

=== His Texas life ===
He settled in Texas in 1839 and lived in Galveston and later Houston, where he was elected a state representative to the Second Texas Legislature in 1847. De Cordova travelled extensively through Texas, including the frontier western areas. Through scrip and direct purchase he acquired large amounts of land to sell to settlers; at one time he had 1,000,000 acres (4,000 km^{2}) in scrip or title. To attract settlers to Texas, he made speeches about Texas in New York, Philadelphia and other US cities, and to the cotton-spinners association in Manchester. His lectures were published on both sides of the Atlantic and were widely read. His land agency, which he owned with his half-brother Phineas de Cordova, became one of the largest such agencies that ever operated in the Southwest. De Cordova and two other men laid out the town of Waco in 1848-49. Town lots of 1 acre (4,000 m^{2}) sold for five dollars, and nearby farmland brought two to three dollars an acre.

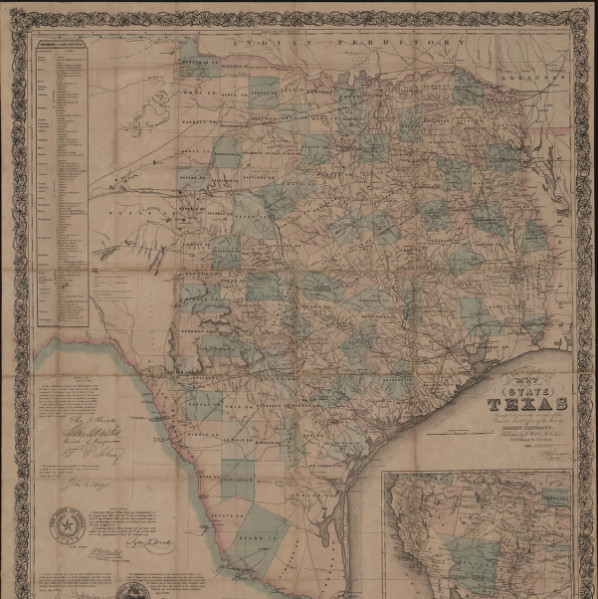
J. de Cordova's Map, State of Texas (c. 1866)

De Cordova and Robert Creuzbaur compiled the Map of the State of Texas, first published in 1849. Much subsequent Texas cartography was based on this map, which was praised by Sam Houston on the floor of the United States Senate. Books de Cordova wrote that were influential in attracting settlers included "The Texas Immigrant and Traveller's Guide Book" (1856), and "Texas, Her Resources and Her Public Men" (1858), the first attempt at an encyclopedia of Texas. Jacob and Phineas de Cordova published two early Texas newspapers, the Texas Herald (also known as De Cordova's Herald and Immigrant's Guide) out of Houston and the Southwestern American out of Austin. The latter was at the solicitation of Governor Peter H. Bell and helped to pass the Compromise of 1850, which resulted in a $10 million payment to Texas for adjusted boundaries after annexation. In the 1850s de Cordova moved from Austin to Seguin, where five miles from town he built for his wife and five children a fine country home, which he called Wanderer's Retreat. In the 1860s he tried to develop a power project on the Brazos River in Bosque County for textile mills to spin Texas cotton. The American Civil War brought financial reverses to de Cordova. When purchasers of his land were unable to make payments he refused to foreclose and turn people off their land; he had first encouraged them to move to Texas. When he died on 26 January 1868, he was buried in Kimball, but in 1935 his body and that of his wife were moved to the State Cemetery of Texas. He was survived by five children. The De Cordova Bend Reservoir, south of Fort Worth on Lake Granbury, and the De Cordova Bend Dam, was named after him.

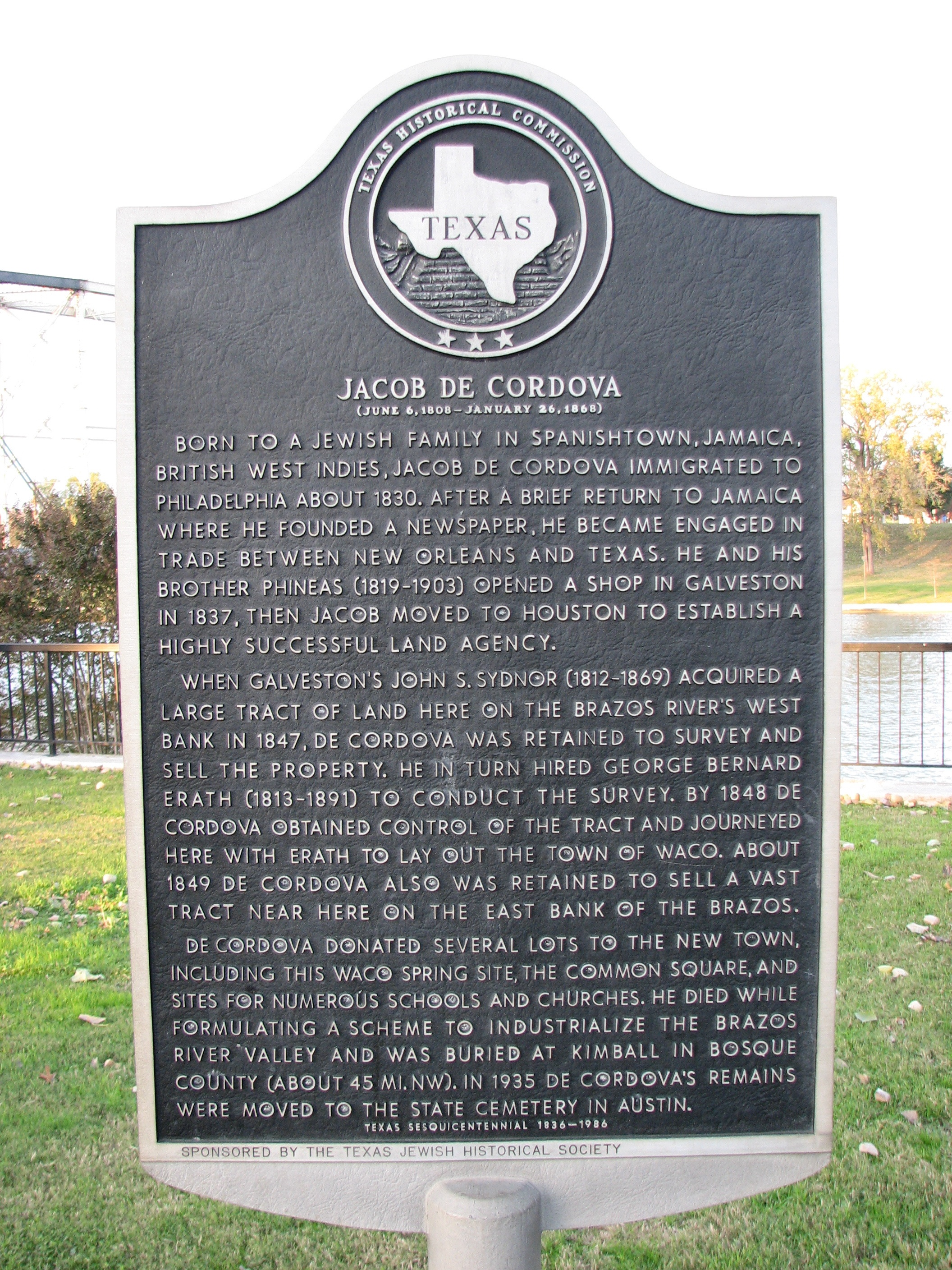
State historical marker in Waco, Texas

== Bibliography ==
- Henry Cohen, "The Jews in Texas," Publications of the American Jewish Historical Society 4 (1896).
- James M. Day, Jacob de Cordova: Land Merchant of Texas (Waco: Heritage Society of Waco, 1962).
- John H. Jenkins, Basic Texas Books: An Annotated Bibliography of Selected Works for a Research Library (Austin: Texas State Historical Association, 1983; reprinted 1988).
- Natalie Ornish, Pioneer Jewish Texans (Dallas: Texas Heritage Press, 1989).
- Malcolm H. Stern, First American Jewish Families: 600 Genealogies, 1654-1988, 3rd edn (Baltimore: Ottenheimer, 1991). Vertical Files, Barker Texas History Center, University of Texas at Austin.
