= Human rights in Jamaica =

Human rights in Jamaica are a process of development that considers poverty levels, violence, fluctuating economic conditions, and representation for citizens. Jamaica is a constitutional parliamentary democracy. Jamaica’s history may be considered to understand the political factors that help shape its government and economy.

== History ==
=== Jamaican Maroons ===
During the colonial era, as early as 1512, African slaves who escaped their Spanish conquerors and joined the indigenous people of lands they encountered were called “Maroons”. The slaves who abandoned the Spanish Colonists in 1655 after the British Colonists’ occupation of Jamaica were known as the Jamaican Maroons. These slaves who managed to escape to their freedom became independent groups who set up their own sovereign communities and coalesced into many heterogeneous groups that maintained their own limited self-government.

In 1738, after major uprisings and violent raids of plantations, major sects of the Maroon communities agreed to specific treaties with the British allowing them a limited amount of autonomy and land.

The strife and insurrection that led to the First Maroon War and then to a Second Maroon War underscored the necessity to negotiate a treaty with the rebellious Maroon society. The economic instability was a major concern for the government at that time which recognized the importance of subduing the Maroon threat.

=== Slavery ===
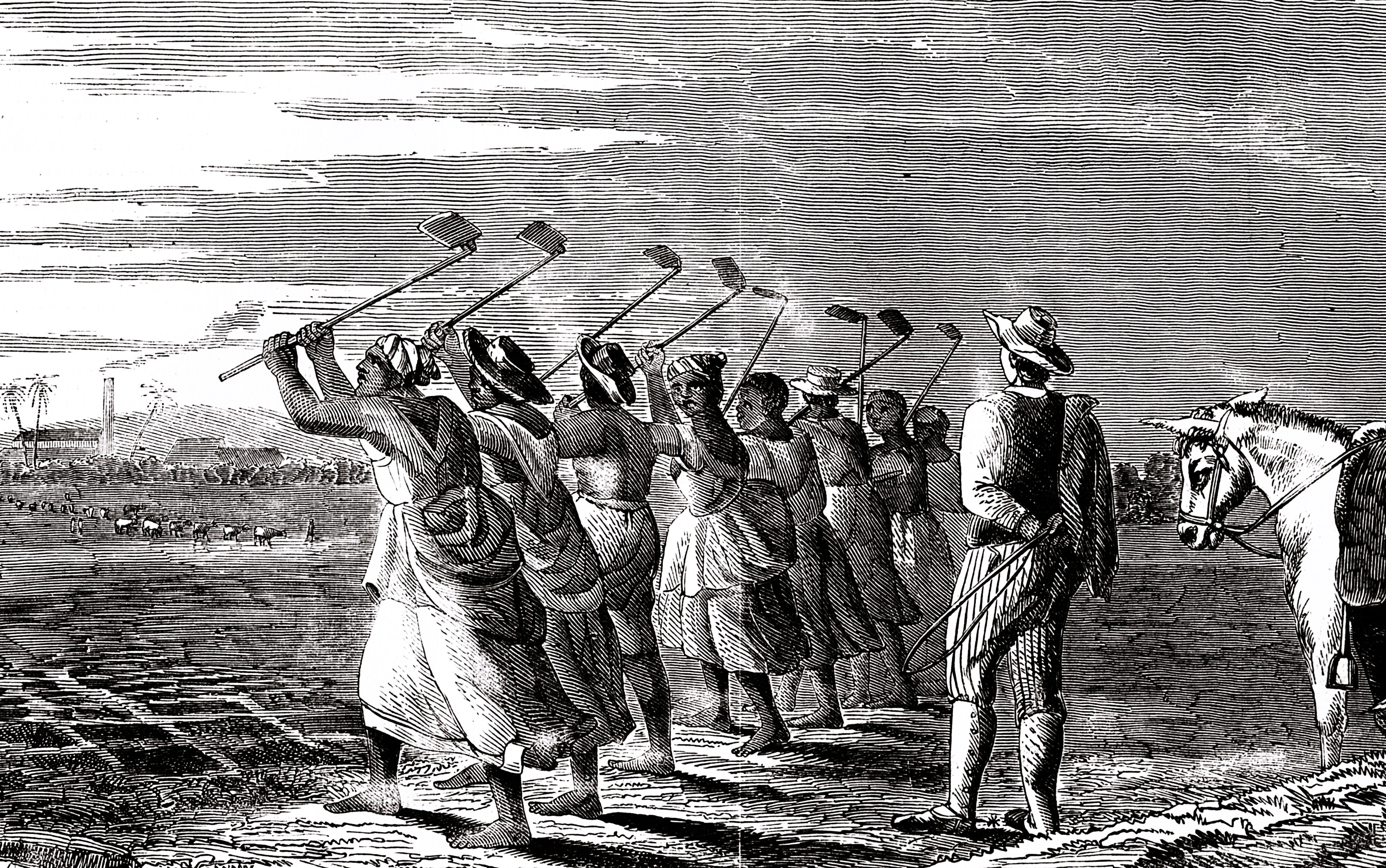
Cane holeing, in a Jamaican plantation, 19th century

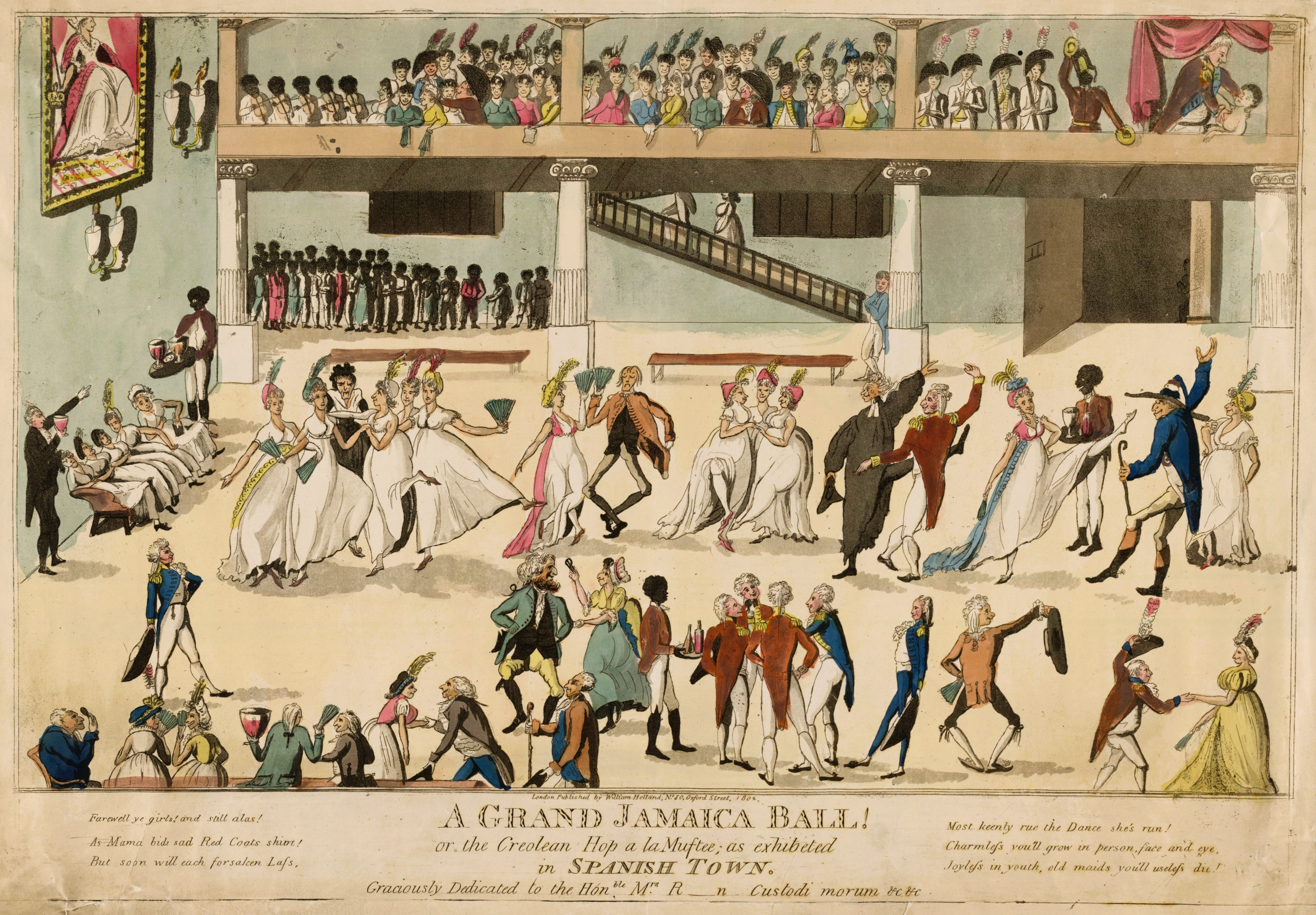
Satirical drawing showing European colonists and enslaved Africans at a ball in Spanish Town in 1802

The Slave Trade Act 1807 where the British Parliament ended the slave trade in the United Kingdom created a new dynamic in Jamaica between the planter class and the remaining slaves. The treatment of the estimated 300,000 slaves in Jamaica worsened as the planter class intransigently went against the British Parliament's admonishment to treat slaves in a more humane manner. Samuel Sharpe and the Baptist War served as a catalyst to force the British Empire to focus greater attention on the moral and practical issues of slavery. The Slavery Abolition Act 1833 was ultimately passed.

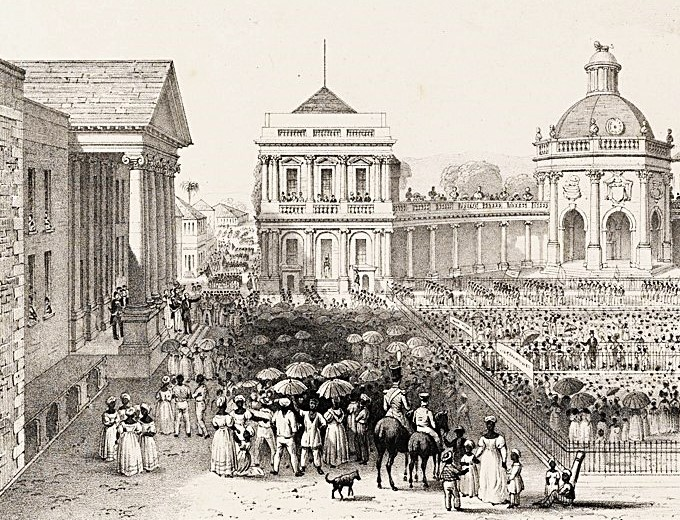
Governor Sir Lionel Smith, accompanied by Revd James Phillippo, proclaiming the abolition of slavery in the colony of Jamaica, on 1 August 1838, from the King's House in Spanish Town

Even though slavery was abolished in 1833, there remained a systematic failure to grant equality to the newly freed slaves. The underlying motives of Britain was apparent in their immediate efforts to compensate the slave owners first which gave them the power to dictate such institutions as six-year apprenticeships. The apprentice system was particularly unpopular among the enslaved, who — unlike their owners — received no compensation. Faced with protests, a resolution was passed on August 1, 1838, immediately releasing all "apprentices" regardless of position from all obligations to their former masters.

In 1865 the Morant Bay Rebellion marked a moment in Jamaican history when the dialogue between the government and the oppressed reached a fever pitch, led by Baptist deacon and activist Paul Bogle. There was confusion between the poor black population and the Maroon population as to where the stronger Maroons' allegiance lay during the siege. It has been said that the Maroons ultimately made a decision to support the British in quelling the uprising on the premise that they wanted to stay loyal to the original treaties between the government and the early Maroon population. John Stuart Mill's social influence on the Jamaican government system was profound because he headed the now defunct Jamaica Committee, which helped create a necessary process of intervention on the behalf of the governed and oppressed that would put into question and challenge the necessity of excessive punitive actions against opposition; ultimately, this helped foster the growing sentiment of freedom of speech.

== Politics ==
=== Political developments ===
Sir John Peter Grant and Sir Henry Wylie Norman contributed in restructuring and reforming the British government system to modernize Jamaica and pave the way for a new independent party system.

In the 1930s, with the activism of organizers and unions, the labor movement started and Jamaica gained a greater degree of political control. This saw the development of a duopoly which was composed of two labor organized parties: the People's National Party; led by Norman Manley in 1938, and the Jamaica Labour Party; led by Alexander Bustamante in 1943. In the mid-1940s, the JLP and Bustamante held the majority in Jamaica's limited-autonomy government under the authority of the Colonial office in London and the governor for a decade. Then in 1955 the PNP and Manley gained back the majority. In 1961, Jamaicans favored the stand-alone sovereignty government status proposed by Alexander Bustamante and the JLP to the Federation status proposed by Norman Manley and the PNP.

=== Independence from the U.K ===
In 1962, Jamaica was now independent while remaining in the British Commonwealth. Alexander Bustamante was named the country's first Prime Minister. The 1970s saw a rise in crime because of the polarization between the two major parties. Police corruption was on the rise and the political climate was in disarray.

In 1972, the PNP regained power with Michael Manley as the Prime Minister. After his election, Jamaica was on a quest to promote and cultivate a more just and equal society. The year of 1976 saw important passages of acts that helped to put more emphasis on promoting human rights. The Status of Children Act of 1976 and the amendment to provide Jamaican women with equal rights to men were watershed moments in the history of human rights in Jamaica.

== Major events ==
=== Controversial legislation ===
In 1974 the Gun Court Act and the Suppression of Crime Acts were passed under the watch of Prime Minister Michael Manley. Oppressive Immigration policies of the United States towards foreign nationals contributed to the increase in illegal syndicalism in Jamaica.

=== Police violence ===
The Montego Bay “Street People” scandal was a conspired attempt by the St James Parish Council truck and law enforcement to secretly transport groups of homeless people in Montego Bay to a St Elizabeth parish to be dumped near a mud lake.

Since the year 2000, out of an estimated 3000 police-related fatalities, only two police officers have been convicted of murder. As reported by Amnesty International, the government of Jamaica continues to foster a “culture of fear” with the impunity that is afforded law enforcement.

On March 14, 2001, a shooting where 60 police officers converged on a house on the peripheries of Kingston, Jamaica gained media attention after the officers shot and killed seven young men at the home.

== LGBT rights ==
Sodomy and/or buggery in Jamaica is a crime that can lead to prison time at hard labour for up to 10 years, however the Jamaican government argues the law is not enforced. However, sexual behaviour between women is legal. Even so, Amnesty International, has received reports of violence against lesbians, including rape and other forms of sexual violence. It is reported that lesbians have been attacked on the grounds of "mannish" physical appearance or other visible "signs" of sexuality. Some reports of abduction and rape come from inner-city communities, where local non-governmental organisations have expressed concerns about high incidences of violence against women.

Jamaica has been described by some human rights groups as the most one of the most homophobic countries in the world because of the high level of violent crime directed at LGBT people.The United States Department of State has also reported that "homophobia was widespread in the country".
