= Gleaner Company =

Jamaican newspaper publisher

Coordinates: 17.976344°N 76.788479°W

Gleaner Company Ltd
- Logo of The Gleaner Company
- Status: Active
- Founded: 1834
- Founder: Joshua and Jacob De Cordova
- Country of origin: Jamaica
- Headquarters location: Kingston, Jamaica
- Distribution: International
- Publication types: Newspapers and radio broadcasts
- Nonfiction topics: News, entertainment, popular culture
- No. of employees: 417 employees
- Official website: jamaica-gleaner.com

The Gleaner Company Ltd. is a newspaper publishing enterprise in Jamaica. Established in 1834 by Joshua and Jacob De Cordova, the company's primary product is The Gleaner, a morning broadsheet published six days each week. It also publishes a Sunday paper, the Sunday Gleaner, and an evening tabloid, The Star. Overseas weekly editions are published in Canada, the United Kingdom and the United States. The paper was known as The Daily Gleaner until 1992.

The company is headquartered in Kingston, Jamaica.

== Overview ==
The Gleaner Company Limited is a Jamaica-based newspaper company. The principal activities of the company and its subsidiaries are the publication and printing of newspapers and radio broadcasting. The company's subsidiaries include Independent Radio Company Limited (IRC)- Power 106 and Music 99 FM, Gleaner Online Limited, Creek Investments Limited, Selectco Publications Limited, GV Media Group Limited and The Gleaner Company (Canada) Inc. and The Gleaner Company (USA) Limited.

There were approximately 417 direct employees. In addition to these direct employees, the company's business depends on contractors and vendors who are business people trading in their own right. Then there are also motor contractors, rural agents, space writers, correspondents, freelance photographers and contributors. In total, some 4,000 people in Jamaica are involved in the Gleaner's operations.

== History ==
The Gleaner commenced publication in the year 1834. It was founded by two brothers, Jacob and Joshua de Cordova.

In 1898 it became a publicly registered company and is listed on the Jamaica Stock Exchange.

From 1834 until mid-1969, the Gleaner Company was situated at various locations on Harbour Street, principally at 148–156 Harbour Street, with some departments operating from 146–161 Harbour Street. Continued growth prompted the company to erect the present building at 7 North Street, where construction work on the plant commenced on 1 February 1967. It was completed in 1969 and blessed by religious leaders in the community on 26 May of that year. By Monday, 14 July of the same year, the company conducted its business entirely on the new premises.

As the need became apparent for the western end of the island to be better serviced, a branch office was established in Montego Bay in 1966, and later advertising offices were opened in Ocho Rios and Mandeville.

== Gleaner publications ==
- The Gleaner is published Monday through Saturday. The Gleaner, a morning broadsheet, is the flagship of the group, containing news, views, sports and in-depth reporting. The Gleaner contains the following regular sections and features the following:
  - Western Focus provides for the needs of the people lining in the five western parishes; this special edition carries news, features, and advertisements from those parishes.
  - The Flair Magazine is designed to address topics of concerns to women.
  - The Financial Gleaner is for the business and financial community.
  - Youthlink is a magazine addressing educational and other issues of concerns to the youth and highlighting their achievements.
- The Sunday Gleaner, first published in 1939, is a weekend paper reaching twice as many readers as the daily paper.
- The Star is an afternoon tabloid. "The people paper", it provides investigative reports, news, special columns, and stories.
- The Weekend Star, first published in 1951, reviews of Jamaican music, dance, theatre, and culture.
- Track and Pools is for the horse-racing fraternity. It features computer-calculated tips for each race.
- The Children's Own is published each week during the academic term.
- Hospitality Jamaica is about tourist industry news.

=== Publications in North America ===
- The Weekly Star, the Entertainment Paper, covers Jamaican music, arts, and theatre, with human interest features and news about community life.
- The Weekly Gleaner with North America Extra is the top Caribbean newspaper, distributed in 22 American and eight Canadian cities.

=== Publication in the United Kingdom ===
- The Weekly Gleaner (UK) carrying news of interest to the West Indians in United Kingdom, the paper offers coverage of important issues and events in both the Caribbean and the United Kingdom.

== Notable years in the life of the company ==
- 1834, 13 September: The first publication was a four-page weekly newspaper printed at 66 West Harbour Street along with the Mercantile Intelligencer. It began life as The Gleaner and Weekly Compendium of News, published on Saturdays only, at a quarterly subscription rate of 10 shillings in Kingston, and 13 shillings and four pence in the rural areas.
  - December: The name changed to The Gleaner: A weekly family newspaper devoted to literature, morality, the arts and sciences, and amusements.
- 1836: Merger of deCordova's Advertising Sheet with The Gleaner to produce a four-page paper, published every day except Sundays.
- 1875: The Gleaner was printed on a steam-driven press.
- 1882: Fire destroyed its plant at 148 Harbour Street and The Gleaner was printed at The Government Printing Office for two weeks.
- 1897, 10 June: The Gleaner became a public company.
- 1902: The Gleaner increased its size to 16 pages and sold for one penny.
- 1907, 14 January: An earthquake and subsequent fire destroyed the building on Harbour Street, four days later the newspaper was on the streets again, and printing being done at the Government Printing Office for a time.
- 1908: Rapid expansion with the introduction of three linotype machines.
- 1912: A photo-engraving department was installed.
- 1917: Hoe Rotary Press was installed.
- 1920: Motor delivery routes were established.
- 1925: The Pink Sheet magazine was added to the Saturday Gleaner.
- 1939, 10 September: The first Sunday Gleaner was published, right after World War II started.
- 1950, 11 June: The first Children's Own newspaper was published.
- 1951, July: The first Overseas Gleaner (now The Weekly Gleaner) was published.
  - 24 November: The first Star was published.
- 1959: The Company installed a Crabtree rotary press, which allowed the Gleaner to print nine colours, and the Star, six colours.
- 1960: Branch offices were established, the first was located in Montego Bay.
- 1962: The Weekend Star was introduced, 24-pages with an eight-page entertainment section, priced at three pence.
- 1963: The Sunday Magazine was added to The Sunday Gleaner.
- 1964: Gleaner shares quoted on the Jamaica Stock Market at 12 shillings per five-shilling share.
- 1969: The Gleaner "The Old Lady of Harbour Street" began operating at 7 North Street, Central Kingston, its current location, where a six-unit Crabtree rotary press was installed.
- 1982: Major computer system installed - making it one of the first newspapers in the Caribbean to switch over to new technology.
- 1992, 7 December: Name change from The Daily Gleaner to The Gleaner.
- 1993: The Company signed an agreement with System Integrators, Inc. (SII) to provide news publishing solutions.
- 1994: The Company installed a 16-unit Goss Urbanite press and a new pre-press system with facility to fully paginate each newspaper page.
- 1997, 16 February: Launch of web site at www.jamaica-gleaner.com
- 9 June, The Gleaner Company Ltd. begun printing The Miami Herald International Satellite Edition on a daily basis. This operation ended on 31 March 1999
- 1999, 31 March, The Gleaner stopped printing The Miami Herald - International Satellite Version
- 2000, April: The Story of The Gleaner: Memoirs and Reminiscences of the newspaper was published.
  - June: The Digital Laboratory was established.
  - September: Gleaner started subscription route in Mandeville
- 2001: Local websites launched go-Kingston and go-Montego Bay.
  - February: The Gleaner’s evening tabloid, The Star, staged its first inaugural Star Awards to recognize excellence in local music.
  - 20 March: the first issue of Youthlink magazine launched.
- 2002: London Extra first published – 25 October
  - Canada Extra first published - 19 December
  - Portmore Star first published - 19 January

2004: Hospitality Jamaica was first published. (13 October)
