= Dion Leonard =

Australian/British ultramarathon runner

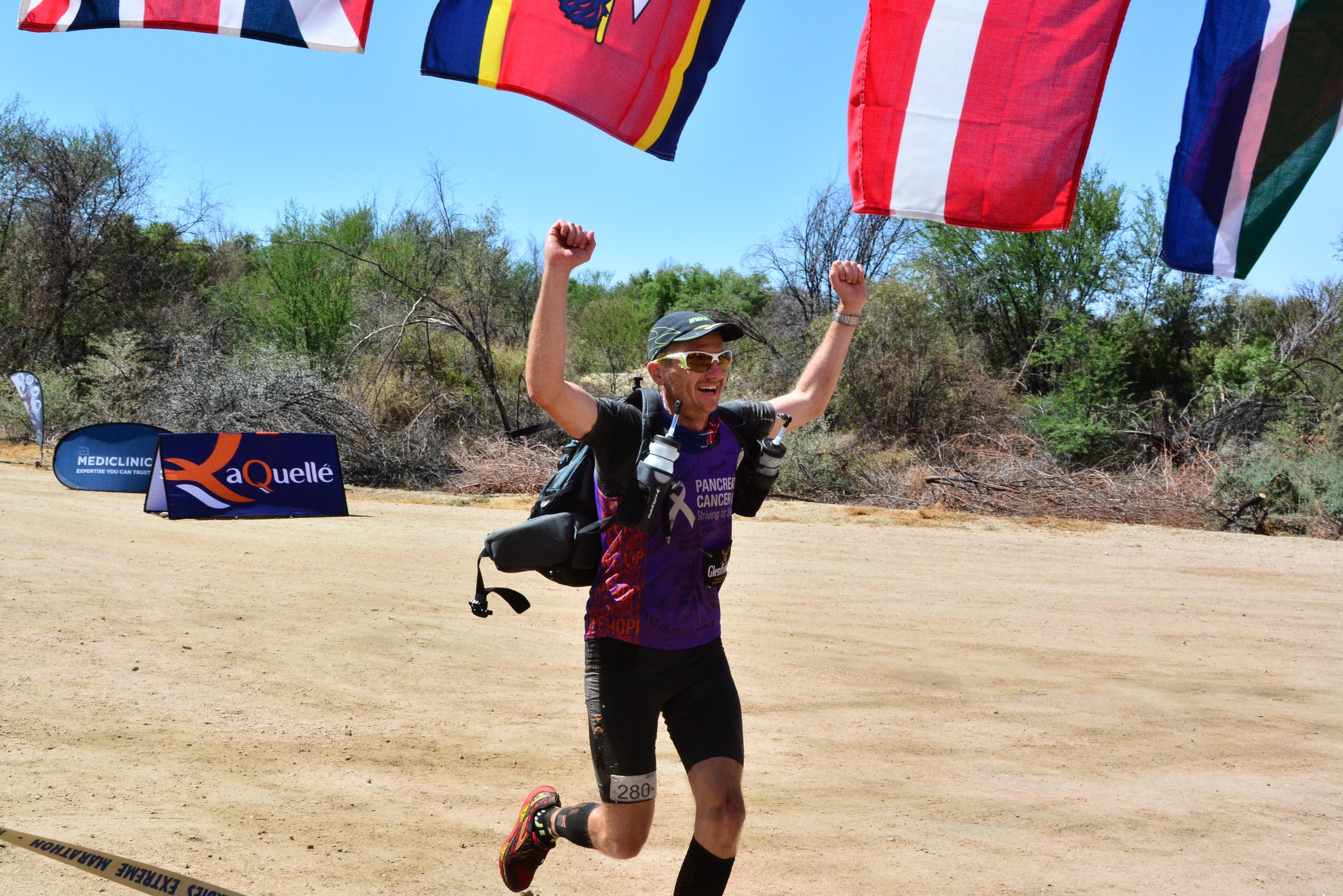
Dion Leonard running the 2013 Kalahari Extreme 250km Marathon in the Kalahari Desert, South Africa

Dion Leonard (born 2 January 1975 in Sydney, Australia) is an Australian/British endurance athlete and ultramarathon runner, motivational speaker, and author of New York Times Bestseller Finding Gobi, the non-fiction memoir of his story of his dog, Gobi, who ran 77 miles of a 155-mile race across the Gobi Desert. Leonard who grew up in Warwick, Queensland before moving to the U.K. started running in 2013 and has already achieved numerous top 10 finishes (including wins) in ultra races around the world in the most extreme conditions. Leonard has not only competed in but completed some of the world's toughest ultra running races across the most inhospitable landscapes including finishing Marathon Des Sables 3 times.

== Race results ==
Throughout his career, Leonard has competed in and found much success in challenging long distance races, very consistently in the top 10 in these major races.

- In 2013, Leonard finished 6th at the 250km Kalahari Augrabies Extreme Marathon in 28 hours and 20 minutes.
- In 2014, Leonard finished 2nd at the 250 km Kalahari Augrabies Extreme Marathon in 23 hours and 28 minutes.
- In 2015, Leonard finished 3rd at the 220 km Cambodia – The Ancient Khmer Path in 29 hours and 35 minutes
- In 2016, Leonard finished 2nd at the Gobi Desert 250 km race in 29 hours and 32 minutes.
- In 2017, Leonard won the 250 km Kalahari Augrabies Extreme Marathon in 26 hours and 22 minutes.
- In 2018, Leonard completed the Triple Crown of 200-mile races (Bigfoot 200, Tahoe 200 & Moab 240), finishing the series in 2nd place overall in 220:10:44.
- In 2019, Leonard won the inaugural Delirious West 200-mile race in a time of 61 hours and 24 minutes. Leonard also became the first male in a single year to complete the Grand Slam of Ultrarunning and the Leadville Leadman series which includes Leadville Trail 100, Leadville Trail 100 MTB, Silver Rush Trail Run 50 miles, Leadville Marathon and Leadville 10 km.
- In 2021, Leonard finished 6th in what is regarded as the 'World's Toughest Race' the Badwater Ultramarathon in 30 hours and 12 seconds.
- In 2024, Leonard finished 2nd in the Denali, Alaska 100km race in 11 hours and 38 minutes. Leonard also finished 15th in the Ultra Gobi 400km non stop race across the Chinese Gobi Desert in 98 hours and 46 minutes.
- In 2025, Leonard finished 7th in the inaugural Copper Kings 100 mile race in Butte, Montana in 23 hours and 15 minutes. Leonard also finished 2nd in the Oregon 200 mile race in Oakridge, Oregon in 56 hours and 12 minutes.

== Media appearances ==
Leonard has been featured on CNN, NBC Today Show, Good Morning Britain, CBS, CNBC, ABC America, Associated Press, ESPN, Pickler & Ben, CCTV, BBC Breakfast, BBC World, Le Parole Della Settimana, Good Morning Croatia, Good Morning Slovenia; Live radio interviews with BBC Radio 5 Live, BBC Outlook, Talk Sport UK, NPR America, ABC Radio Australia, Eric Zane Show. Leonard has also been interviewed across print media including China Daily, The New York Times, The Sunday Times, Washington Post, UK Independent, USA Today, Canadian Post, Corrierre della Serra, Novi List, Grazia, Variety, La Republica, The Sun, New York Post, Daily Mail, Le Monde and The Sydney Morning Herald. In 2020, Leonard spoke with the podcast This is Love about meeting his dog, Gobi, during a 155-mile race across the Gobi Desert.

== Accolades ==
In June 2017, Leonard presented Gold Duke of Edinburgh Awards with his dog Gobi at Holyrood Palace alongside Prince Edward, Earl of Wessex.

In September 2019, Leonard was invited by the President of Slovenia to the Open Gala Day to speak to invited guests about his story of Finding Gobi

In September 2023, Leonard received an award at the 26th Fervent Global Love of Lives for his contribution to helping and empowering others and also for raising awareness for animals in need. As part of the event Leonard was invited to meet Tsai Ing-wen

== Books ==
In October 2016, HarperCollins Publishers announced the expected publication of a trilogy of books about Leonard and Gobi's journey together. The book titled Finding Gobi, received favourable praise in Publishers Weekly. The paperback version was officially launched in United States on 1 June 2017 and went on to become a New York Times Bestseller at number 3. The hardback version was released in United Kingdom, Australia and New Zealand on 13 June 2017 reaching the Sunday Times Bestsellers list. This was followed by a paperback version later released in February 2018 also reaching the Sunday Times Bestseller List. Finding Gobi is now available in 21 languages: English, Spanish, Dutch, Polish, Italian, Japanese, German, Finnish, Swedish, Danish, Portuguese, Simplified Chinese, Chinese Traditional, Korean, French, Vietnamese, Hungarian, Bulgarian, Croatian, Slovene, Russian, Serbian and Romanian. A chapter book edition for young adult's and a children's picture book was also released in 2017. The young adult edition book won the 2017 New York City Big Book Award.

On 13 March 2017, 20th Century Fox announced that it was developing a movie based on Dion Leonard and Gobi's extensive journey together. On 20 February 2021 it was announced that Sony Pictures and Tencent Films had purchased the rights from Fox to now make the movie.

- Finding Gobi: A Little Dog with a Very Big Heart, (HarperCollins) June 2017. ISBN 978-0718098575
- Finding Gobi: Young Reader's Edition: The True Story of One Little Dog's Big Journey, (Thomas Nelson) August 2017. ISBN 978-0718075316
- Gobi: A Little Dog with a Big Heart (Picture Book), (Thomas Nelson) August 2017. ISBN 978-0718075293
- Finding Gobi for Little Ones (Board Book), (Thomas Nelson) March 2018. ISBN 978-0718075309
- Lara The Runaway Cat: How One Cat Travelled the World to Discover Home is Where the Heart is, (HarperElement) February 2019. ISBN 978-0008316181
- Where's Gobi? Seek and Find (Picture Book) (Thomas Nelson) October 2024. ISBN 978-1400252893

Leonard has also written in:

- Beastly Journeys: Unusual Tales of Travel with Animals (Bradt Travel Guides), June 2018. ISBN 978-1784770815
- Test Your Dog: Is Your Dog an Undiscovered Genius? (HarperCollins) September 2018. ISBN 978-0008149659
- Turning Right: Inspire the Magic by Kay Bretz (Major St Publishing) ISBN 978-0-6489803-2-2
