= Daniel Leonard =

American loyalist and lawyer (1740 – 1829)

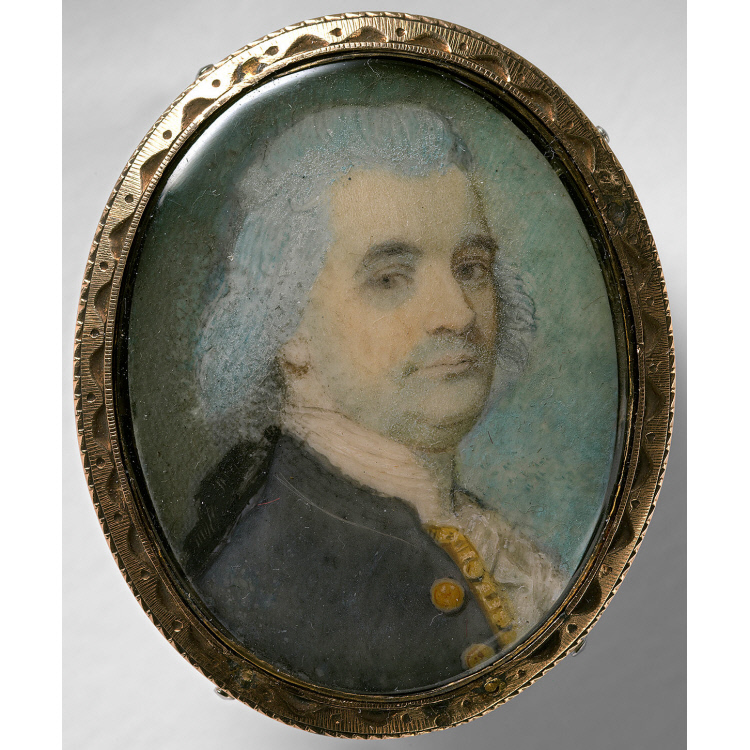
Daniel Leonard Portrait

Daniel Leonard (May 18, 1740 – June 27, 1829) was a lawyer from colonial Massachusetts and a Loyalist in the American Revolution.

== Biography ==
Born in Norton, Massachusetts, Leonard was a member of a prominent family who made their fortune from their iron works in Taunton, Massachusetts. After graduating from Harvard College, Leonard began to practice law in Taunton.

Daniel Leonard was a Loyalist raised by slaves after his mother died in childbirth and was made judge Mandamus during the American Revolution. Daniel's father Col. Ephraim Leonard "who, in 1734, erected his iron works on the Canoe River. The works were assessed for five hundred pounds. He was, without doubt, the wealthiest man in the North Precinct" and owned and gifted over 12 slaves and lived on a 1,200 acre estate near the East Mansfield Common in Massachusetts.

During the Revolutionary crisis, the British Parliament passed the Massachusetts Government Act, which, among other things, abolished elections for the Massachusetts Governor's Council and instead called for the councilors to be appointed by the royal governor. Leonard accepted an appointment by Governor Thomas Hutchinson to this new royal-controlled Council. Massachusetts Patriots were outraged, and attacked Leonard's house. He fled to British-occupied Boston for safety.

In 1774 and 1775, Leonard, writing under the name "Massachusettensis," wrote a series of letters in support of royal government that were published in a Loyalist Boston newspaper, the Massachusetts Gazette. John Adams, writing as "Novanglus," answered the letters in the Boston Gazette. The exchange ceased with the Battles of Lexington and Concord. Many, including Adams, erroneously believed that Jonathan Sewall had written the Massachusettensis letters.

During the War of Independence, Leonard left with the British when they evacuated Boston in 1776. His property, like that of other Loyalists, was confiscated.

Exiled from Massachusetts, he served as Chief Justice of Bermuda from 1782 to 1806, and later retired to London. In 1821, he revealed himself to be "Massachusettensis."
