= Williams & Glyn's Bank =

Former British bank

Williams & Glyn's Bank Limited
- Type: Subsidiary
- Industry: Financial Services
- Founded: 1970 (1753 as Glyn, Mills)
- Defunct: 1985 (dissolved at Companies House in 2021)
- Fate: Merger with parent
- Successor: NatWest Group
- Headquarters: 1 Princes Street, London EC2R 8PB
- Products: Banking and Insurance
- Parent: NatWest Group

Williams & Glyn's Bank Limited was established in London in 1970, when the Royal Bank of Scotland merged its two subsidiaries in England and Wales, Williams Deacon's Bank Ltd. and Glyn, Mills & Co. In 1985, Williams & Glyn's was fully absorbed into the Royal Bank of Scotland and ceased to trade separately.

Williams & Glyn later returned as a division of The Royal Bank of Scotland (RBS) and National Westminster Bank (NatWest), consisting of 307 RBS branches in England and Wales and NatWest branches in Scotland. The division was formed because the then RBS Group, owner of the two banks, was required by the European Union (EU) to divest a portion of its business after HM Government took an 84% stake in the group during the 2008 United Kingdom bank rescue package, which the EU classed as state aid. RBS Group was required to divest Williams & Glyn by the end of 2017. The Williams & Glyn unit had approximately 250,000 small business customers, 1,200 medium business customers and 1.8 million personal banking customers.

A consortium including Kuwait Investments, Corsair Capital, Centerbridge Capital and the Church of England invested £600 million into the business in September 2013, in exchange for equity once the bank was floated in an initial public offering (IPO). On 5 August 2016, RBS Group announced it had abandoned plans to spin off Williams & Glyn as a stand-alone business, stating that the new bank could not survive on its own due to Brexit. The group was to sell the unit to another bank as an asset transfer.

In February 2017, HM Treasury and the European Commission reached a provisional agreement in which RBS would be able to retain the Williams & Glyn assets in return for investing £833 million into a fund aimed at increasing small and medium-sized enterprise (SME) lending by challenger banks and for RBS agreeing to allow SME customers of challenger banks to use its branch network for cash and cheque handling. A final agreement for the retention of the Williams & Glyn assets by RBS Group was approved by the European Commission in September 2017. RBS Group announced its intentions to close 162 of the branches that were to have formed Williams & Glyn in April 2018. The closure of a further 54 branches was announced in September 2018.

== History ==
=== Williams Deacon's Bank and the Manchester & Salford Bank ===
The London private bank of Williams Deacon & Co can date its history back to 1771 when the partnership of Raymond, Williams, Vere, Lowe and Fletcher was first recorded. It ceased payment in 1825 and was reconstituted with different shareholders as Williams, Deacon, Labouchere & Co, before finally becoming Williams Deacon in 1882. It was acquired by the Manchester & Salford Bank in 1890.

The Manchester & Salford Bank was founded in 1836 as a joint stock bank and became a substantial force in Lancashire banking and by 1890 it had over 45 branches. In that year it acquired Williams Deacon, primarily to obtain the latter's seat on the London Bankers' Clearing House. The registered office was moved to London but the head office remained in Manchester. The bank also changed its name to Williams Deacon & Manchester & Salford Bank, shortened to Williams Deacon's Bank in 1901.

The enlarged bank continued to expand but its commitment to the declining cotton industry after World War I, exacerbated by the effects of the Great Depression, stretched its own finances and, encouraged by the Bank of England, Williams Deacon's was acquired by the Royal Bank of Scotland in 1930.

=== Glyn, Mills & Co. ===
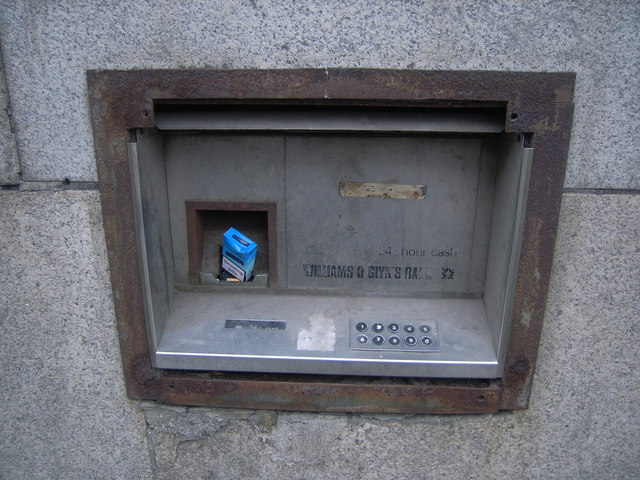
An early Williams & Glyn's Automated Teller Machine.

Glyn, Mills & Co. was founded as the private bank, Vere, Glyn & Hallifax, in the City of London in 1753 by Joseph Vere, Richard Glyn and Thomas Hallifax. The Vere family interest ended in 1766; William Mills joined in 1772; and when the last of the Hallifaxes departed in 1851 the Bank became known as Glyn, Mills & Company.

Acquisitions included Currie's in 1864, Holt & Co. in 1923 and Child & Co. in 1924. Child & Company, founded in the 1580s, remains part of RBS Group Wealth Management today. In 1923, it also acquired the private military bank Holt & Co. founded in 1809, which continued to trade separately until merged into the Drummonds Bank business in 1992.

In 1939, the bank was purchased by Royal Bank of Scotland, which became known as the Three Banks Group.

=== National Bank ===
The National Bank of Ireland was founded in London in 1835, becoming The National Bank Limited in 1859. The bank's core Irish business was divested to the Governor and Company of the Bank of Ireland as National Bank of Ireland in 1966. The remaining branches in England and Wales were acquired by National Commercial Bank of Scotland (itself formed by the 1959 merger of National Bank of Scotland and Commercial Bank of Scotland), although they continued to trade separately.

In 1969, National Commercial Bank merged with the Royal Bank of Scotland and, in 1970, the National Bank branches became part of the newly formed Williams & Glyn's Bank, consolidating their interests south of the border. In 1972, Williams & Glyn's and five other banks formed the Inter-Alpha Group of Banks, of which RBS Group remains a member, to exploit opportunities in the then European Economic Community.

== Proposed revival of the brand ==
Williams & Glyn
- Industry: Financial services
- Founded: September 2009
- Defunct: September 2017
- Headquarters: Manchester (proposed HQ), United Kingdom
- Number of locations: 307 branches
- Area served: Great Britain
- Parent: The Royal Bank of Scotland Group

=== Project Rainbow ===
In 2000, the Royal Bank of Scotland Group acquired National Westminster Bank in a hostile takeover. In 2009 it was announced that all 311 Royal Bank branches in England and Wales together with the seven Scottish branches of NatWest were to be divested by the troubled group, under the dormant Williams & Glyn's brand, to comply with European Union state aid requirements. The process was expected to take up to four years to complete.

==== Agreement with Santander Group ====
In March 2010, it was reported that the group had issued a sales memorandum for the business, which would include 318 branches and around £20 billion in loans provided to small businesses and households. Following the deadline for initial bids on 7 April, Santander Group, Virgin Money, National Australia Bank, BBVA and the private equity firm JC Flowers were all confirmed to have submitted bids for consideration.

As a condition of the British Government purchasing an 81% shareholding in the group in 2009, the European Commission ruled that RBS sell a portion of its business, as the purchase was categorised as state aid. In August 2010, the group reached an agreement to sell 318 branches to Santander UK, made up of the RBS branches in England and Wales and the NatWest branches in Scotland. It was announced on 3 August that the Spanish Santander Group would pay around £1.65 billion for the branches, expected to be rebranded as part of Santander UK, in a deal set to be completed by December 2013. Santander withdrew from the sale on 12 October 2012.

==== Agreement with Corsair consortium ====
In September 2013, the group confirmed it had reached an agreement to sell 314 branches to the Corsair consortium, made up of private equity firms and a number of institutional investors. The branches, incorporating 250,000 small business customers, 1,200 medium business customers and 1.8 million personal banking customers, were due to separated from the group in 2016 as a standalone business under the Williams & Glyn's name. By May 2015, the total number of branches included in the new business had been reduced to 307.

==== Preparation for launch ====
In October 2015, the RBS Group submitted an application for a banking licence for the new bank. The group also published its transition plan for the launch of Williams & Glyn. According to the plan, a website for the new bank would have been launched and branch signage would have been changed to the Williams & Glyn identity, which would have initially operated as a trading name used by Royal Bank of Scotland plc in England and in Wales and National Westminster Bank plc in Scotland. In the lead up to the formal launch of the new bank, which was expected in early 2017, customers would have been able to access Williams & Glyn branded internet, mobile and telephone banking services, and would have received new branch sorting codes and new debit cards. To facilitate the transition, separate internet and telephone banking systems were created for RBS customers in England and Wales. Planning applications for the erection of new branch signage bearing the Williams & Glyn brand identity were submitted to local authorities across the north of England in early 2016. A standalone ATM network for the new Williams and Glyn bank was created in June 2016.

==== Cancellation ====
On 16 December 2015, RBS confirmed it had received a number of informal offers for the bank, and would seek to complete a sale by the end of 2017. HM Treasury subsequently announced it had asked the Competition and Markets Authority to suspend a review into how competitive the bank would be in the UK banking sector.

On 5 August 2016, RBS published details of the group's half-yearly financial results, revealing a £2.05 billion loss for the first half of 2016. RBS Group blamed historically low interest rates and the fallout from the UK's 2016 United Kingdom European Union membership referendum with uncertainties caused by the pro-Brexit result. The result indicated, according to RBS, that Williams & Glyn would not prosper as an independent bank. Instead, Reuters reported that Santander UK was interested in buying the unit outright.

In August 2016, RBS cancelled its plan to spin off Williams & Glyn as a separate business, stating that the new bank could not survive independently. It revealed it would instead seek to sell the operation to another bank.

Santander had abandoned talks in September 2016. CYBG plc, owner of Clydesdale Bank and Yorkshire Bank, confirmed in October 2016 that it had made what it described as a "preliminary non-binding proposal" for the unit. In the same month RBS confirmed that it would be unable to sell Williams & Glyn by the end of 2017, potentially giving the European Commission the right to take control of the sales process.

By December 2016, both Santander and CYBG had scaled back their bids, citing issues with integrating the six NatWest branches in Scotland, and with integrating large corporate customers. RBS instead started exploring selling other assets or closing branches that it could not sell thus requiring customers based at those branches to find alternative banking arrangements.

=== Alternative Remedies Package ===
From 2015 to 2017, Jim Brown was CEO of Williams & Glyn. He replaced John Maltby in the role, who stood down.

RBS was ordered to sell Williams & Glyn by regulators as part of the bank's obligations for receiving state aid during the government bailout in 2009 after the 2008 financial crisis. However, RBS was unable to find a buyer for what were several RBS banks in England and Wales, as well as NatWest branches in Scotland, branded under the resurrected Williams & Glyn name.

In February 2017, HM Treasury suggested that the bank should abandon the plan to sell the operation, and instead focus on initiatives to boost competition within business banking in the United Kingdom. In that month the HM Treasury and the European Commission reached a provisional agreement in which RBS Group would be able to retain the Williams & Glyn assets in return for investing £750 million into a fund aimed at increasing SME lending by challenger banks and for RBS agreeing to allow SME customers of challenger banks to use its branch network for cash and cheque handling. The European Commission agreed in principle to the new proposals in July 2017, but the amount to be used to increase competition in the UK SME banking sector was increased to £833 million. This plan was formally approved by the European Commission in September 2017.

RBS ultimately avoided the sale by deal-making with the government, earning approval to reintegrate Williams & Glyn and the associated branch network into its core bank. As an alternative to divesting of Williams & Glyn, RBS agreed to create a $1 billion fund to support competing companies, as part of an agreement with the Treasury and the European Commission.

A final agreement, known as the "Alternative Remedies Package", was ultimately reached with the College of European Commissioners in September 2017, allowing RBS Group to retain the Williams & Glyn assets and bringing the sale process to a close.

=== Closure of Williams and Glyn branches ===
After creating the fund, RBS considered relaunching Williams & Glyn as a new brand, but risks led to the bank abandoning the idea, closing 162 branches by June of 2018 as a result.

In early 2018, The Royal Bank of Scotland Group announced its plans for restructuring to comply with new UK-wide rules on ring-fencing retail banking operations from investment banking operations. As part of this restructuring, all retail banking assets of the existing Royal Bank of Scotland plc were transferred to Adam and Company plc on 30 April 2018, which assumed the Royal Bank of Scotland name in the process.

Afterwards, in September 2018, RBS said it was in relation to the failed spinoff of the Williams & Glyn brand that it was shuttering 54 branches. RBS said it was closing branches close to each other to reduce overlap, with the branches officially closed in January 2019. The BBC quoted the Unite union criticizing the move, in part for limiting easy access to disabled and elderly customers. The closures left 54 RBS branches in England and Wales total.

As part of its brand management strategy, RBS group has decided that NatWest should become its primary customer facing brand in England and Wales and Royal Bank of Scotland its core brand in Scotland. In April 2018, it was revealed by RBS Group CEO, Ross McEwan that 162 Royal Bank of Scotland branded branches that were to have formed part of Williams & Glyn were to be closed as they were located close to NatWest branded branches, which are part of the same group. The closures were expected to happen between July and November 2018 and result in the loss of almost 800 jobs. It was proposed that customers with Royal Bank of Scotland accounts would in future be able to use NatWest branches for counter services. In late May, McEwan added that further branch closures could be announced before the end of the year. The closure of a further 54 branches was announced in September 2018 with an expected loss of 258 jobs.

In July 2020 the Royal Bank of Scotland Group rebranded itself as NatWest Group, with the bank continuing to operate as NatWest and Williams & Glyn outside of Scotland.

=== Corporate affairs ===
==== Logo and branding ====
Initially planned to be called Williams & Glyn's Bank, it was announced in December 2013 that the bank name would be shortened to Williams & Glyn owing to the difficulty of using an apostrophe in branding and website addresses. The original Williams and Glyn's Bank was formed by merging Williams Deacon's Bank with Glyn, Mills & Co.

A logo for Williams and Glyn was designed by Landor Associates in April 2014. The logo featured the words "Williams" and "Glyn" joined by a large ampersand. This was followed by the development of a full corporate visual identity for the new bank by The Designship. New uniforms which were to have been worn by Williams & Glyn staff were revealed at an event held at SS Great Britain in Bristol. The historic Williams and Glyn's Bank did not have a distinct logo, instead it used the "Daisy Wheel" logo of its parent company, The Royal Bank of Scotland.

==== Leadership ====
The leadership team of the part of the Royal Bank of Scotland plc that was to have become Williams & Glyn was composed of:

- Director - Philip Nevill Green
- Director - Mervyn Davies
- Director - Lance West
- Chief executive officer - Jim Brown
- Chief operating officer - Chris Davis

== See also ==
- Williams & Glyn's Bank v Boland
- Roger Fulford, Glyn’s 1753–1953 (1953)
- Eric Gore Browne, Glyn, Mills & Co (1933)
