= James Blair-Cunynghame =

Scottish banker (1913–1990)

Blair-Cunynghame in 1970.

Sir James Ogilvy Blair-Cunynghame, OBE (28 February 1913 – 4 January 1990) was a Scottish banker and personnel manager; he was a chairman of the Royal Bank of Scotland and its parent organisation, the National Commercial Bank of Scotland Group.

== Life ==
Blair-Cunynghame was born on 28 February 1913, the son of an Edinburgh stockbroker, Edwin Blair-Cunynghame, and his wife, Anne (née Tod). He attended Sedbergh School and then King's College, Cambridge. He worked for Unilever from 1935 to 1938, when he went back to Cambridge to conduct research about personnel management.

While at Cambridge, he lectured for the Workers' Educational Association, and was elected to a fellowship at St Catharine's College, Cambridge, in 1939. During the Second World War, he served with the Royal Artillery and Intelligence Corps, eventually rising to the rank of lieutenant colonel; his work took him to the Middle East and Bletchley Park. For his war service he was appointed a Member of the Order of the British Empire in 1943, and promoted two years later to be an Officer of the order. He spent a year in the Foreign Office, before joining the British Overseas Airway Corporation as Chief Personnel Officer in 1947.

In 1955, the National Coal Board (NCB) established a staff department following recommendations in the Fleck Report; Blair-Cunynghame was appointed its director-general. He then sat on the NCB from 1957 to 1959 as the staff member, and then joined the Royal Bank of Scotland's board in 1960. He was appointed vice-chairman in 1961, and chairman four years later, overseeing the merger with the National Commercial Bank of Scotland in 1969; Blair-Cunynghame then became chairman of the resulting National Commercial Bank of Scotland Group; in 1971, he also returned to its subsidiary, the Royal Bank of Scotland, as chairman, serving until 1976, when he was appointed chairman of another subsidiary, Williams & Glyn's Bank. He retired as chairman of the latter and of the National Commercial Bank of Scotland Group in 1978, but continued to sit on the group's board until 1982. He also held a range of other positions, including membership of the Scottish Economic Council (1965–74).

Blair-Cunynghame received honorary doctorates from the University of St Andrews and the University of Edinburgh (in 1965 and 1969 respectively), was knighted in 1976, and elected a Fellow of the Institute of Banking the following year. He died on 4 January 1990.

== Likenesses ==
- Sir James Ogilvy Blair-Cunynghame by Godfrey Argent (bromide print, 28 May 1970). National Portrait Gallery, London (reference NPG x996).
