= Holt's Military Banking =

Trading name of the Royal Bank of Scotland

The Royal Bank of Scotland Holt's Branch, Farnborough
- Industry: Retail banking
- Founded: 1809
- Headquarters: Farnborough, Hampshire, England, UK
- Products: Military banking
- Parent: NatWest Group
- Website: www.holtsmilitarybanking.co.uk

Holt's Military Banking is a trading name of The Royal Bank of Scotland, a subsidiary of NatWest Group, offering dedicated banking facilities to service personnel in the United Kingdom and on operational tours of duty overseas. It can trace its origins to a Mr. Vesey, army agent to the 23rd Regiment of (Light) Dragoons, in Dublin in 1802.

Holt's currently serves 35,000 British military personnel customers and manages 900 non-public business banking accounts.

== History ==
=== William, Nugent and John Kirkland ===
William Kirkland began as army agent to the 1st (Royal) Regiment of Foot in 1809. In 1815, he was succeeded by his brother, Nugent Kirkland, who was joined by his nephew John Kirkland in 1822 and retired from business in 1825. Nugent Kirkland brought with him Vesey's Irish agency, having been the 23rd Dragoons's Paymaster. In 1818, John Kirkland had been appointed by HRH The Duke of Kent as agent of the 7th (Royal Fusiliers) Regiment of Foot and, in 1824, Lord Palmerston appointed him General Agent for the War Office.

The role of army agent ‌involved‌ ‌keeping‌ ‌the‌ ‌accounts‌ ‌of‌ ‌regiments,‌ ‌distributing‌ ‌pay‌ ‌and‌ ‌subsidies,‌ ‌dealing‌ ‌in‌ ‌supplies‌ ‌of‌ ‌clothing‌ ‌and‌ ‌equipment‌ ‌and‌ ‌administering‌ ‌claims‌ ‌for‌ ‌pensions‌ ‌and‌ ‌injury.‌‌

=== Holt & Co. ===
In 1863, Vesey Weston Holt was appointed army agent of the 16th (Bedfordshire) Regiment of Foot and joined Sir John in partnership. On the death of Sir John in 1871, Holt became sole partner and the firm was renamed V.W. Holt & Co. He was succeeded by his son, Vesey George Mackenzie Holt, in 1881.

In 1884, Percy Shute Lawrie joined Sir Vesey, bringing the agency founded by his grandfather in 1780 and the firm was styled Holt, Lawrie & Co. until 1891.

Links were forged with the Royal Navy, through the 1915 acquisition of naval agents Woodhead & Co. and with the Royal Air Force, through the offer of part of the newly-formed service's pay agency to Holt & Co. in 1918.

=== Glyn, Mills & Co. ===
Following Sir Vesey's death in 1921, Holt & Co. merged with the private bank of Glyn, Mills, Currie & Co., briefly becoming Glyn, Mills, Currie, Holt & Co. until a further merger with Child & Co. in 1924, when the name was shortened to Glyn, Mills & Co., with both Holt's and Child's carrying on as separate operations.

The squirrel emblem, still in use today, dates back to at least the 1920s.

In 1931, Glyn, Mills & Co. was acquired by The Royal Bank of Scotland and Holt's and Child's continued as branches of Glyn, Mills & Co. The Royal Bank of Scotland had acquired the struggling Williams Deacon's Bank (and the prestigious Western Branch of the Bank of England) in 1930 and the combined company came to be known as the Three Banks Group.

During‌ ‌the Second World War,‌ ‌the‌ ‌banking‌ ‌and‌ ‌pay‌ ‌departments‌ ‌were‌ ‌evacuated‌ ‌to‌ ‌Osterley‌ ‌Park,‌ near Isleworth, then on the outskirts of London. The pay‌ ‌agency‌ ‌accounts‌ ‌increased‌ ‌from‌ ‌2,600‌ ‌in‌ ‌1930‌ ‌to‌ ‌9,900‌ ‌in‌ ‌1939‌ ‌and‌ ‌42,600‌ ‌by‌ ‌1945.‌ ‌After‌ ‌the‌ ‌war‌, ‌the‌ ‌pay‌ ‌and‌ ‌ledger‌ ‌departments‌ ‌were‌ ‌moved‌ ‌again ‌to‌ ‌new‌ ‌offices‌ ‌at‌ ‌Lampton,‌ ‌near‌ ‌Osterley.‌ ‌

=== Royal Bank of Scotland ===
In 1969, The Royal Bank of Scotland merged with the National Commercial Bank of Scotland to form the National and Commercial Banking Group. (Note: National and Commercial Banking Group became the Royal Bank of Scotland Group in 1979 and, following the merger with National Westminster Bank in 2000, NatWest Group in 2020.) While the Scottish branches were merged into the Royal Bank, Glyn, Mills & Co. and Williams Deacon's Bank were merged with the English branches of the National Bank (a National Commercial subsidiary) to form Williams and Glyn's Bank. As there was no longer any advantage in operating separately, Williams and Glyn's was itself absorbed into The Royal Bank of Scotland in 1985.

Following the introduction of the military salary in 1970, the Army and Royal Air Force pay agencies were not renewed and the pay department was closed.

In 1976, Holt’s opened an office in Farnborough and the business was brought together there when RBS Holt's branch in Whitehall was closed and transferred to the nearby London Drummonds branch in 1992. (Note: Messrs. Drummond had been the Royal Bank's first acquisition south of the Scottish border in 1924; it survives as a private banking brand of The Royal Bank of Scotland.)

== Services ==
In 2003, Holt's expanded the scope and range of its services and launched the "Military Centre of Excellence" in Farnborough, where it holds accounts for the vast majority of Army regiments, as well as a large proportion of Navy ships and RAF stations. It is authorised as a brand of The Royal Bank of Scotland by the Prudential Regulation Authority.

Holt’s offers personal banking facilities to regular and reserve service personnel, veterans and their families and, given the many similarities, has extended its proposition to Foreign and Commonwealth Office diplomatic and consular staff. It also provides financial services expertise to Royal Navy Ships and Bases, British Army Regiments and Corps and to Royal Air Force Stations, as well as a number of military associations and charities.

In 2015, Holt’s Military Banking, National Westminster Bank and The Royal Bank of Scotland signed the Armed Forces Covenant.

Holt's is a corporate partner of the Army Sports Control Board and sponsor of the Royal Military Academy Boxing Club.

== See also ==
- Child & Co.
- Drummonds Bank
- Cox & Kings
