= Jim Brown (banker) =

New Zealand banker

- Occupation: Banker

Jim Brown is a New Zealand banker and the former chief executive of Sainsbury's Bank. He is the former chief executive of Ulster Bank from 2011 to 2015 and Williams & Glyn from 2015 to 2017.

== Career ==
Brown worked for Citibank in Asia, Australia and New Zealand. From 2005 to 2011, Brown was based in Hong Kong as chief executive of Retail and Commercial Markets, Asia for RBS Asia.

From 2011 to 2015, Brown was chief executive of Ulster Bank. In April 2015 it was reported that Brown was the highest paid banker in Ireland, with his overall pay package at €1.63 million (£1.16M), up 66% from €979,000 a year earlier. Brown said his time as CEO was "hugely challenging". He was followed by Paul Stanley as acting chief executive.

Brown was president of the Institute of Banking in Ireland.

From 2015 to 2017, Brown was chief executive of Williams & Glyn, a division of the Royal Bank of Scotland. He replaced John Maltby in the role, who stood down.

On 11 June 2019, Sainsbury's announced Brown had been appointed chief executive of Sainsbury's Bank. In June 2019, he also became a member of the operating board of the Sainsbury's group.

In March 2024, Brown left his role at Sainsbury's due to retirement.

Business positions
Preceded by Cormac McCarthy	CEO of Ulster Bank; 2011–2015	Succeeded by Paul Stanley; Acting
Preceded by John Maltby	CEO of Williams & Glyn; 2015–2017	Branch network disestablished
Preceded by Peter Griffiths	CEO of Sainsbury's Bank; 2019–present	Incumbent
