= Great Conduit =

Underground channel in England

Coordinates: 51.5137°N 0.0916°W

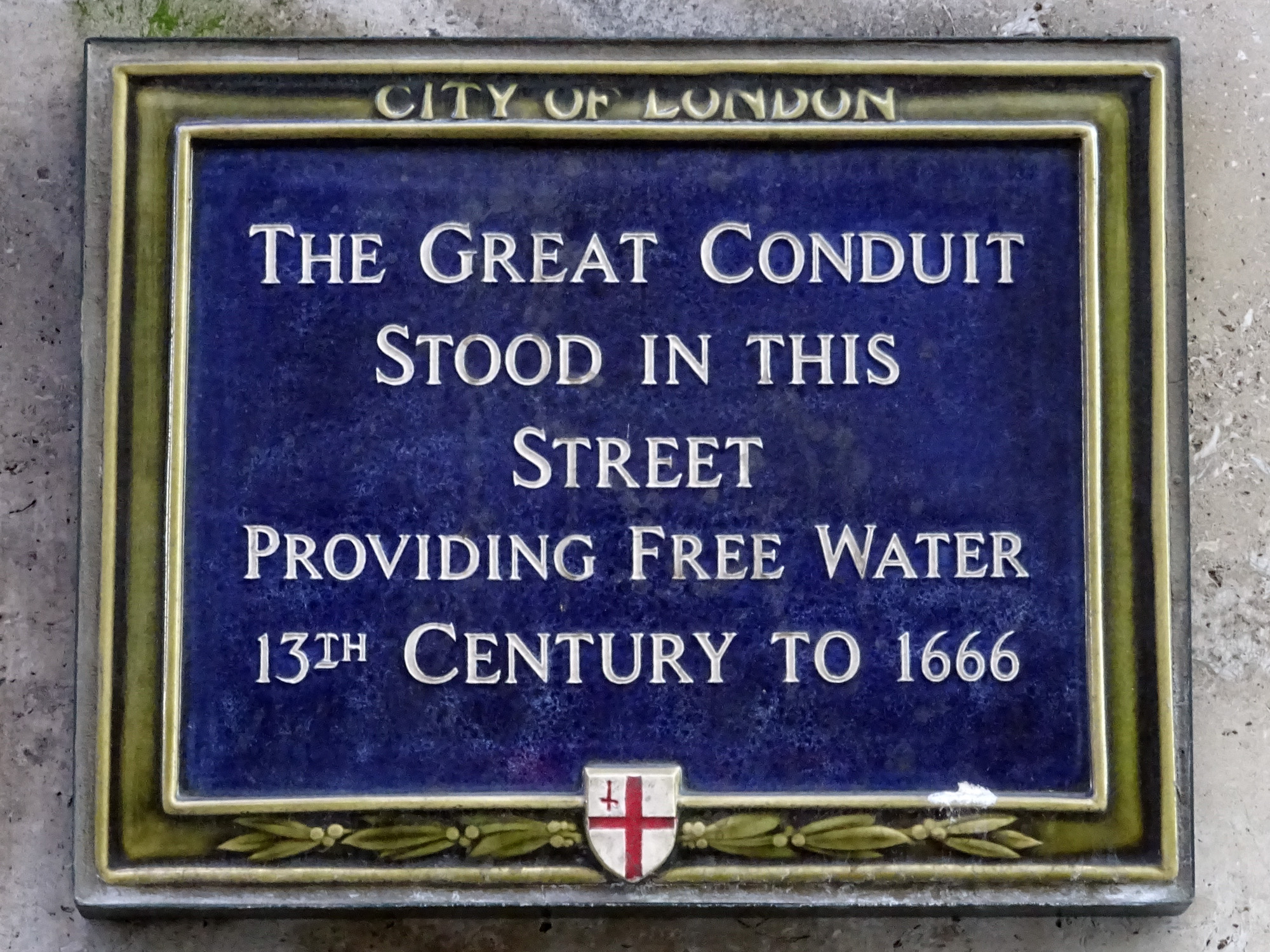
Official, City of London Arms-bearing, dark blue rectangular plaque that reads: The Great Conduit stood in this street providing free water 13th century to 1666

The Great Conduit was a man-made underground channel in London, England, which brought drinking water from the Tyburn to Cheapside in the City.

In 1237 the City of London acquired the springs of the Tyburn and built a small reservoir, a head of water, to help serve the city with a steady, free, flowing supply. Work on the conduit began in 1245. It was much repaired over centuries. It ran towards Charing Cross, along the Strand north of which were fields. It then followed Fleet Street. At Fleet Street most of the city was to the north-east. It then ran along Cheapside (meaning market side, a key retail and general market of the city) where a building housed a great trough/tank and led to a surplus, overflow channel. Citizens from this were at liberty to draw water in small amounts, and greater for permitted purposes. Wardens were appointed to stem taking too much water, unpermitted taking or diversion, and to repair pipes. Extensions were made leading to other parts of the city. Other conduits were constructed in the 15th century AD (CE).

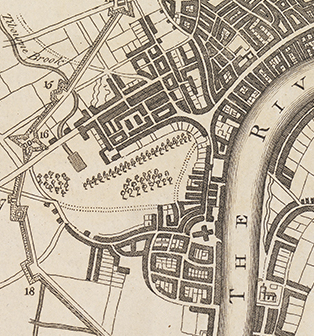
A map depicting Westminster in 1643 which shows plans for Cromwellian walls and forts; and the reservoir in Green Park. The latter was the conduit's source. Its marked the Tyburn's northern mouth, an undrawn, probably no longer, middle mouth of medieval times being south of Westminster Abbey and a further one being near much later Vauxhall Bridge

In the 15th century further source was added to the main conduit, from the Westbourne, enabling a new, additional off-tap at Cripplegate: one parish within and one without (outside) a northern gate in ancient, sparsely intact walls.

In 1582, The Standard, a similar conduit was erected to the east. It would cease functioning around 1600 and be removed in 1674.

Use of the conduit ceased after the Great Fire of London in 1666.

== See also ==
- London water supply infrastructure
