= Cornhill, London =

Ward and street in the City of London

Coordinates: 51.5135°N 0.085°W

Cornhill
- Ward
- Location within Greater London
- Cornhill ward boundaries since 2013
- OS grid reference: TQ327811
- Sui generis: City of London
- Administrative area: Greater London
- Region: London
- Country: England
- Sovereign state: United Kingdom
- Post town: LONDON
- Postcode district: EC3
- Dialling code: 020
- Police: City of London
- Fire: London
- Ambulance: London
- UK Parliament: Cities of London and Westminster
- London Assembly: City and East

Cornhill (formerly also Cornhil) is a ward and street in the City of London, the historic nucleus and financial centre of modern London, England. The street runs between Bank Junction and Leadenhall Street in Central London.

The hill from which it takes its name is one of the three ancient hills of London; the others are Tower Hill, site of the Tower of London, and Ludgate Hill, crowned by St Paul's Cathedral. The highest point of Cornhill is at 17.7 metres (58 ft) above sea level.

== History ==
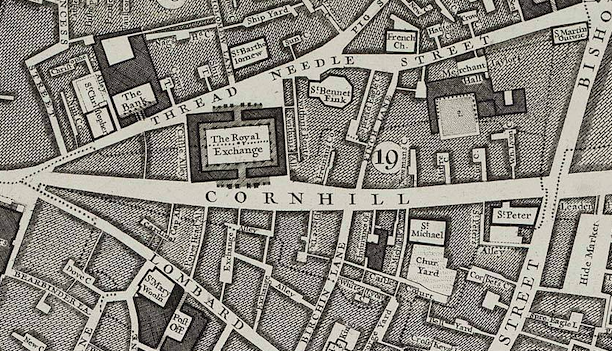
Cornhill, 1746

Cornhill is one of the traditional divisions of the City. The street contains two of the City churches designed by Sir Christopher Wren: St. Michael, Cornhill, and St Peter upon Cornhill, reputed to occupy the oldest Christianised site in London. Both are on the site of the Roman forum of Londinium. At its other end it meets Threadneedle Street, Poultry, Lombard Street and others at Bank junction. Sir Thomas Gresham's original Royal Exchange fronted onto Cornhill, but its successor on the site, designed by William Tite, faces towards the Bank of England across the junction with Threadneedle Street.

The "Standard" near the junction of Cornhill and Leadenhall Street was the first mechanically pumped public water supply in London, constructed in 1582 on the site of earlier hand-pumped wells and gravity-fed conduits. The mechanism, a force pump driven by a water wheel under the northernmost arch of London Bridge, transferred water from the Thames through lead pipes to four outlets. The service was discontinued in 1603. This became the mark from which many distances to and from London were measured and the name still appears on older mileposts (but see also the nearby London Stone and St. Mary-le-Bow church). As an alternative to this “Standard”, 200 metres away from Leadenhall Street, opposite No 32 Cornhill, Google Maps Street View shows a pillar with spout and pump handle inscribed: “On this spot a well was first made... by Henry Wallis Mayor of London in the year 1282.”

In 1652, Pasqua Rosée, possibly a native of Ragusa, Italy, opened London's first coffeehouse, in St. Michael's Alley off Cornhill.

The publishers Smith, Elder and Co, based at No. 65, published the popular literary journal The Cornhill Magazine from 1860 to 1975, as well as the Dictionary of National Biography. The magazine was first edited by William Makepeace Thackeray.

Cornhill Street is the address of the "Scrooge and Marley" counting house, the employer of Bob Cratchit, in Charles Dicken's 1843 novella, A Christmas Carol.

== Contemporary Cornhill ==
Today, the street is commonly associated with opticians and makers of optical apparatus such as microscopes and telescopes. A statue of the engineer James Henry Greathead was erected in 1994 in the road beside the Royal Exchange, which lies within the ward. Underneath the modern pavement is the world's first underground public toilet, which opened in 1855. Users were charged a standard fee of 1d, reputedly giving rise to the saying to "spend a penny".

Cornhill formed part of the marathon course of the 2012 Olympic and Paralympic Games. The women's Olympic marathon took place on 5 August and the men's Olympic marathon on 12 August. The four Paralympic marathons were held on 9 September.

The postcode for the street is EC3V.

=== Role in City elections ===
Cornhill is one of 25 wards in the City of London, and each elects an Alderman to the Court of Aldermen, and Commoners (the City equivalent of a councillor) to the Court of Common Council of the City of London Corporation. Only electors who are Freemen of the City of London are eligible to stand.

The current alderman is Robert Howard and the current members of Common Council are Peter Dunphy (Deputy), Joanna Abeyie and Tessa Marchington elected uncontested in 2025.

The Common Council election results, from 23 March 2017, are below:

Common Council election 2017: Cornhill ward
Party	Candidate	Votes	%	±%
Labour	Joseph James Batty	20		
Independent	Peter Gerard Dunphy	92		
Independent	Stephen Decatur Haines	85		
Independent	Ian Christopher Norman Seaton	77		
Turnout			29.2	

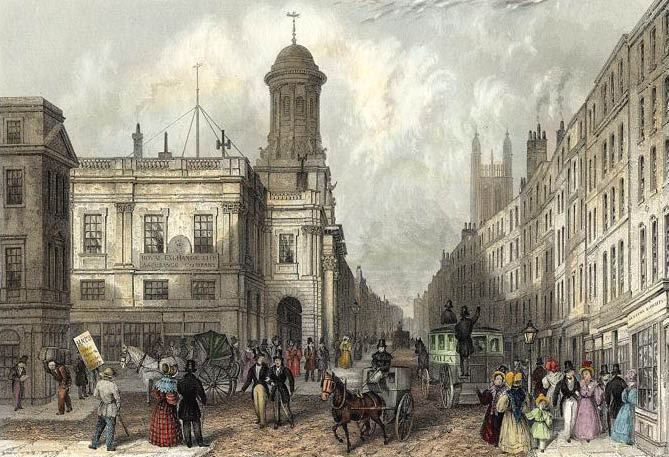
A drawing of Cornhill in the 1830s. The Royal Exchange is on the left.

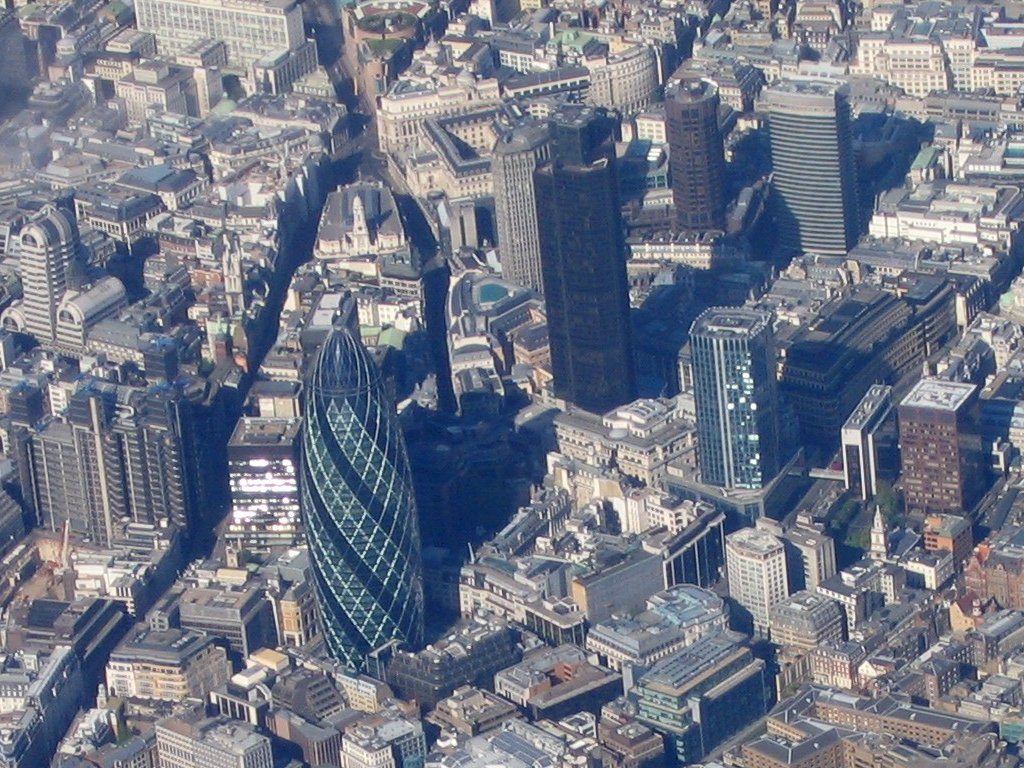
Cornhill from the air

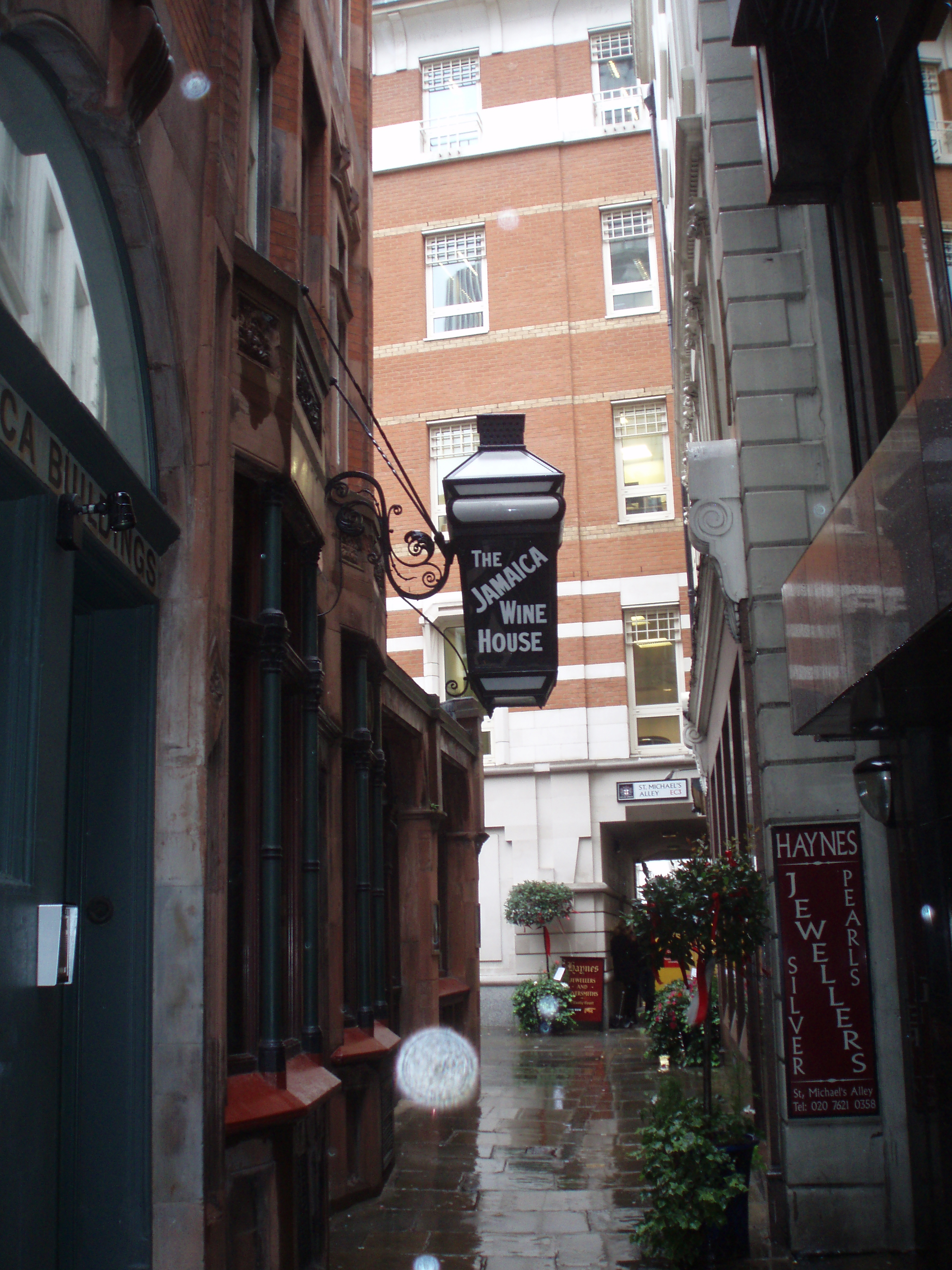
Alley adjacent to St. Michael's

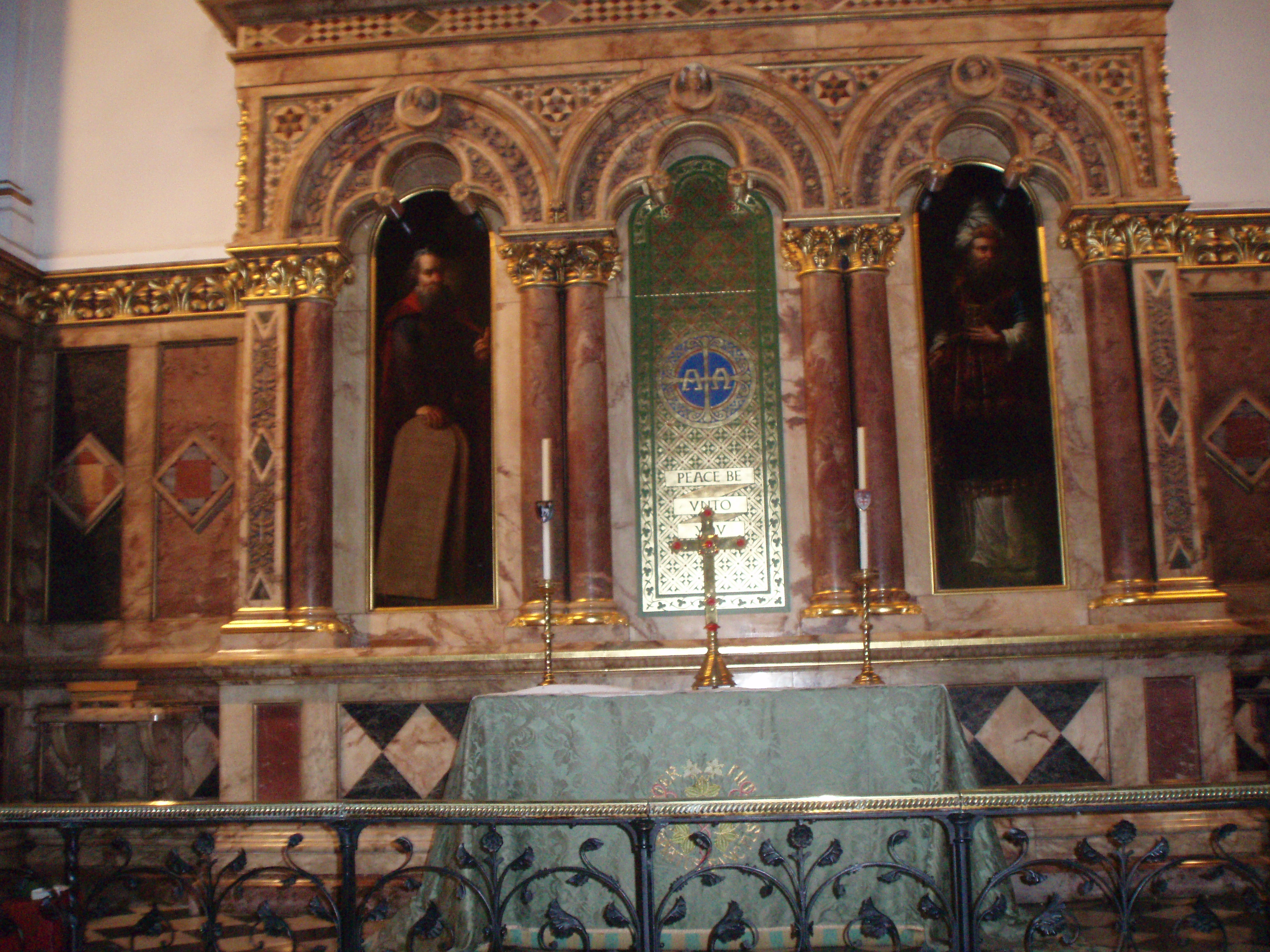
Interior of St. Michael's

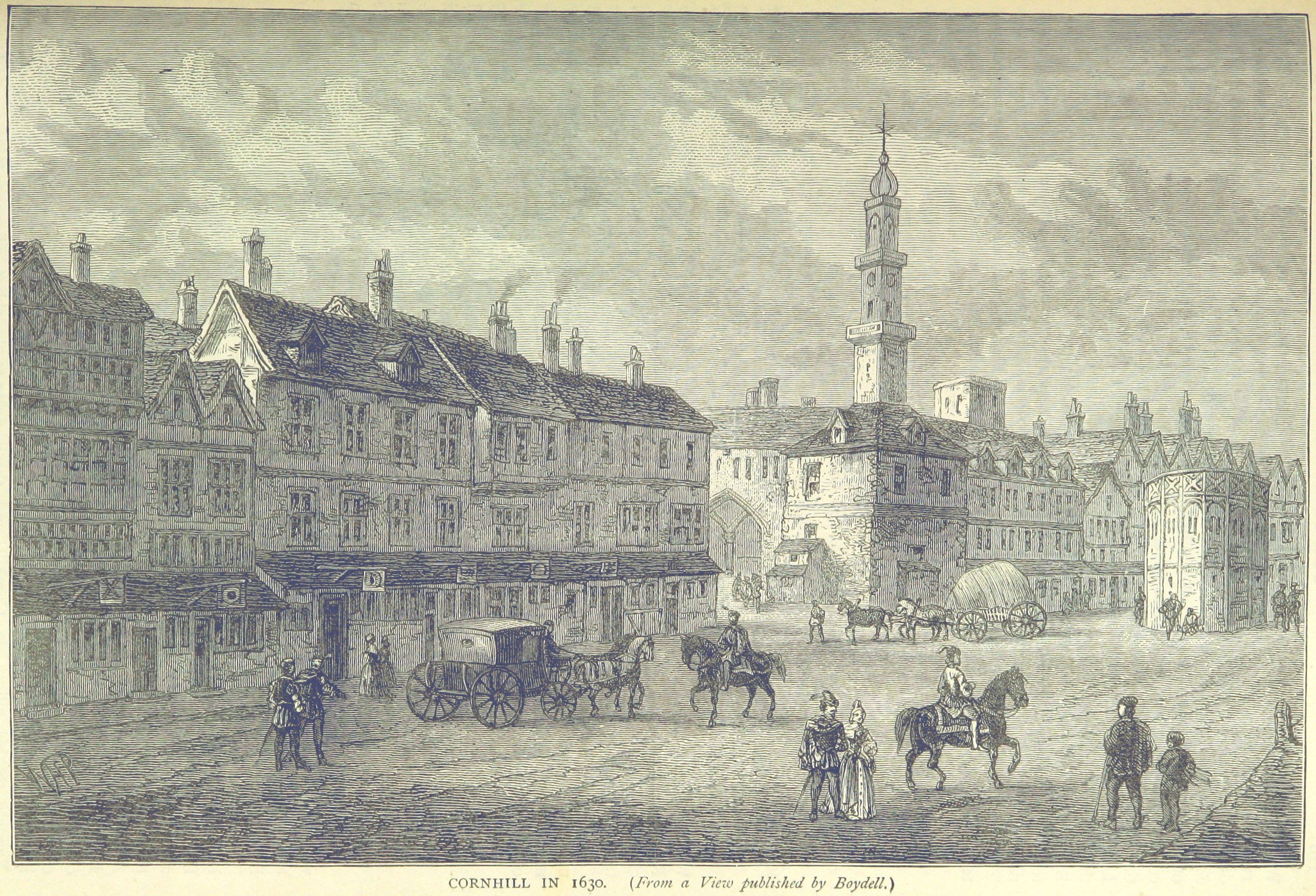
Cornhill in 1630, showing the Royal Exchange and the Water-Conduit, called the Tun

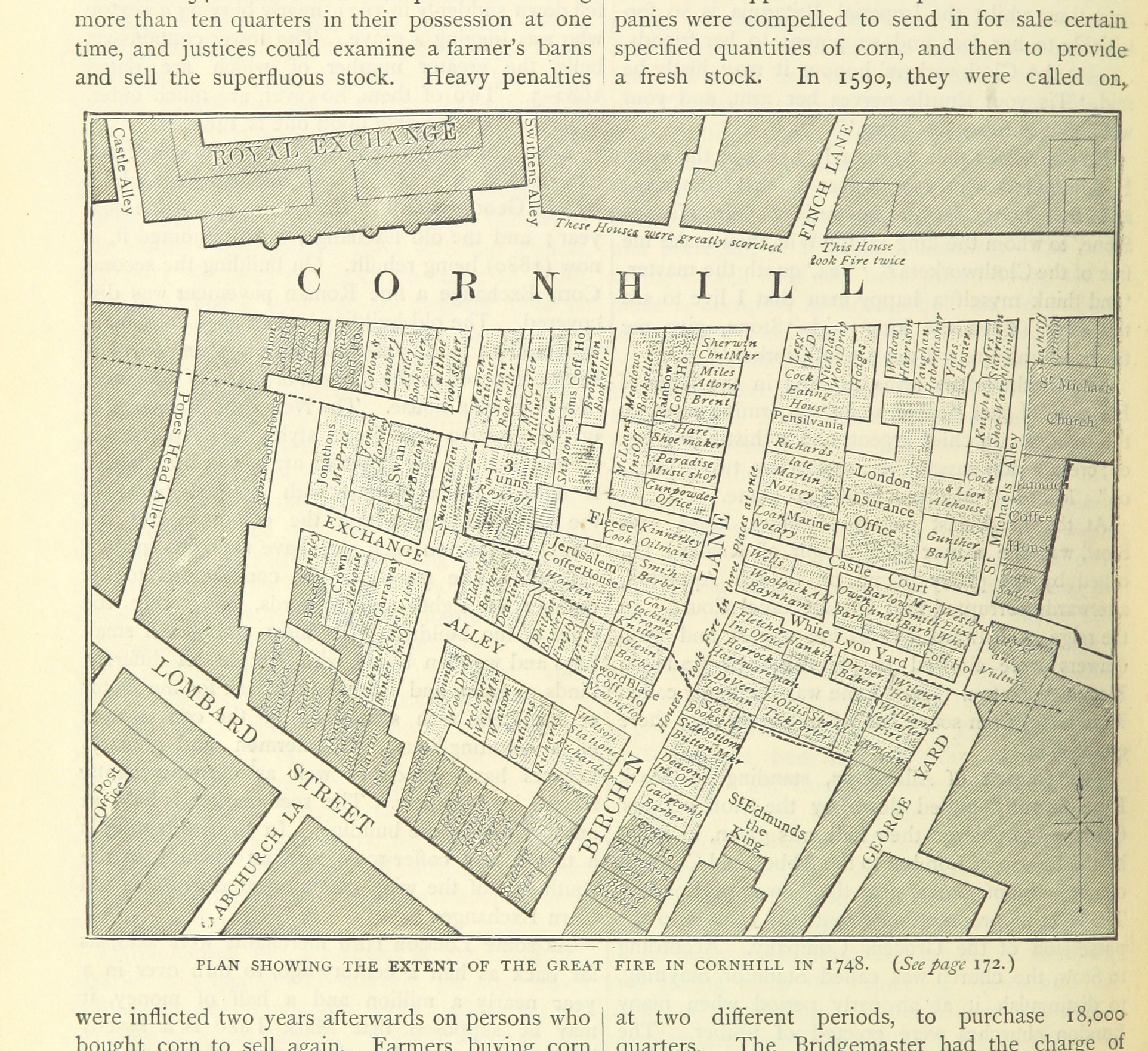
Plan showing the extent of the Great Fire in Cornhill in 1748
