= Charing Cross =

Point from which distances from London are measured

Coordinates: 51.5075°N 0.1275°W

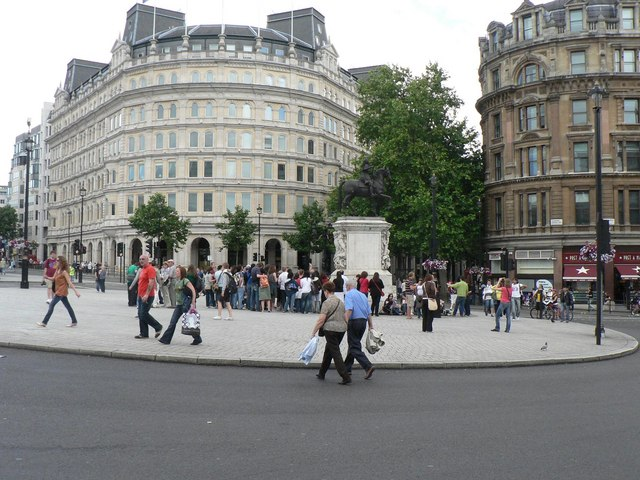
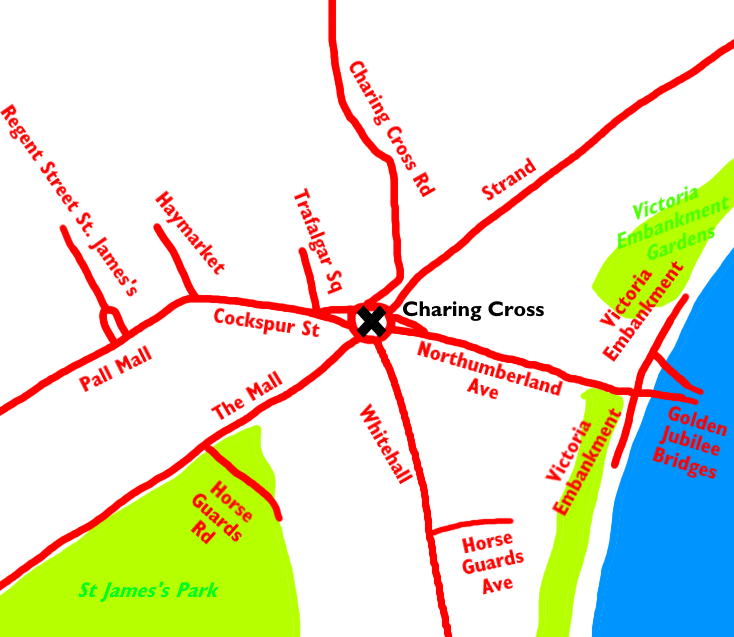
- Top: The Charing Cross roundabout, with a Statue of Charles I on the site of the original Eleanor Cross in the then hamlet of Charing, an important junction since the middle ages. Bottom: A map of Charing Cross and its immediate surroundings.

- Location within Greater London
- OS grid reference: TQ302804
- London borough: Westminster
- Ceremonial county: Greater London
- Region: London
- Country: England
- Sovereign state: United Kingdom
- Post town: LONDON
- Postcode district: WC2
- Dialling code: 020
- Police: Metropolitan
- Fire: London
- Ambulance: London
- UK Parliament: Cities of London and Westminster
- London Assembly: West Central

Charing Cross (/ˈtʃærɪŋ/ CHA-ring) is a junction in Westminster, London, England, where six routes meet. Since the early 19th century, Charing Cross has been the notional "centre of London" and became the point from which distances from London are measured. Clockwise from north, the routes that meet at Charing Cross are: the east side of Trafalgar Square leading to St Martin's Place and then Charing Cross Road; the Strand leading to the City; Northumberland Avenue leading to the Thames Embankment; Whitehall leading to Parliament Square; The Mall leading to Admiralty Arch and Buckingham Palace; and two short roads leading to Pall Mall and St James's.

The name is derived from the hamlet of Charing ('Riverbend') that occupied the area of this important road junction in the middle ages, together with the grand Eleanor cross that once marked the site. The medieval monumental cross, the Charing Cross (1294–1647), was the largest and most ornate instance of a chain of medieval Eleanor crosses running from Lincoln to this location. It was a landmark for many centuries of the hamlet of Charing, Westminster, which later gave way to government property; a little of the Strand; and Trafalgar Square. The cross in its historical forms has lent its name to its locality, including Charing Cross Station. On the forecourt of this terminus station stands the ornate Queen Eleanor Memorial Cross, a taller emulation of the original, built to mark the station's opening in 1864.

A bronze equestrian statue of Charles I, erected in 1675, stands on a high plinth, situated roughly where the medieval monumental cross (the 'Charing Cross') had previously stood for 353 years, since its construction in 1294, until it was destroyed in 1647 by the revolutionary government of Oliver Cromwell. The famously beheaded King, appearing ascendant, is the work of French sculptor Hubert Le Sueur.

Charing Cross is marked on modern maps as the road junction around the statue's traffic island. It is also used as the street name for adjacent buildings on the south side of the junction, e.g. Drummonds Bank, at 49, Charing Cross. The name previously applied to the entire road between Great Scotland Yard and Nelson's Column (see map), but since January 1931 all but the northernmost tip has been designated part of Whitehall.

== History ==
=== Location and etymology ===
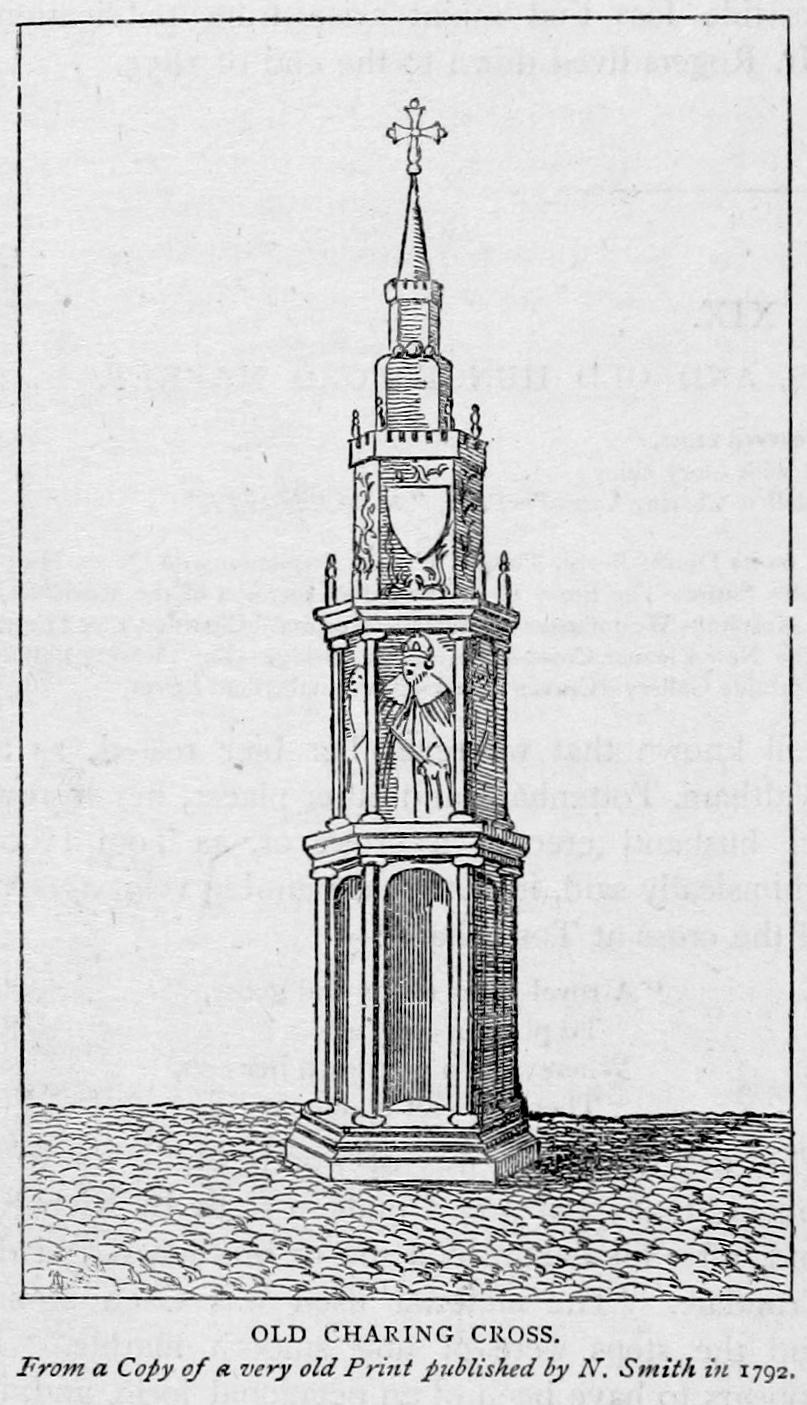
The old Eleanor cross at Charing, c. 1293 to 1643

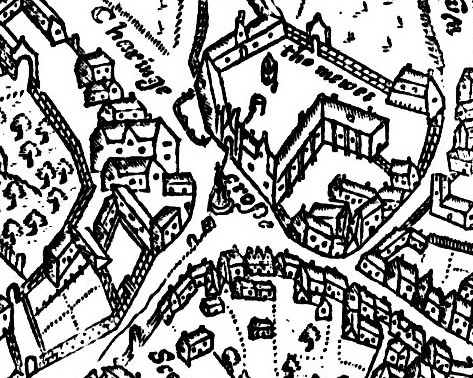
Charing Cross shown on John Norden's map of Westminster, 1593. The map is oriented with north to the top right, and Whitehall to the bottom left.

Erect a rich and stately carved cross,
Whereon her statue shall with glory shine;
And henceforth see you call it Charing Cross.

— George Peele The Famous Chronicle of King Edward the First (1593)

The name of the lost hamlet, Charing, is derived from the Old English word ċierring, a river bend, in this case, referring to a bend in the Thames. A debunked folk etymology claimed the name is a corruption of chère reine ("dear queen" in French), in reference to Queen Eleanor of Castile, but the name pre-dates Eleanor's death by at least a hundred years.

The suffix "Cross" refers to the Eleanor cross made during 1291–94 by order of King Edward I as a memorial to his wife, Eleanor of Castile. This place latter comprised little more than wayside cottages serving the Royal Mews in the northern area of Trafalgar Square, and built specifically for the Palace of Whitehall (much of the east side of Whitehall). A variant from the hazy Middle English orthography of the late fourteenth century is Cherryngescrouche.

The stone cross was the work of the medieval sculptor, Alexander of Abingdon. It was destroyed in 1647 on the orders of the purely Parliamentarian phase of the Long Parliament or Oliver Cromwell himself in the Civil War. A 70 ft (21 m)-high stone sculpture in front of Charing Cross railway station, erected in 1865, is a reimagining of the medieval cross, on a larger scale, more ornate, and not on the original site. It was designed by the architect E. M. Barry and carved by Thomas Earp of Lambeth out of Portland stone, Mansfield stone (a fine sandstone) and Aberdeen granite; and it stands 222 yards (203 metres) to the north-east of the original cross, focal to the station forecourt, facing the Strand.

Since 1675 the site of the cross has been occupied by a statue of Charles I, the king beheaded during the Cromwellian era, mounted on a horse. The site is recognised by modern convention as the centre of London for determining distances (whether geodesically or by road network) in preference to other measurement points (such as St Paul's Cathedral which remains the root of the English and Welsh part of the Great Britain road numbering scheme). Charing Cross is marked on modern maps as a road junction, and was used in street numbering for the section of Whitehall between Great Scotland Yard and Trafalgar Square. Since 1 January 1931 this segment has more logically and officially become the northern end of Whitehall.

=== St Mary Rounceval ===
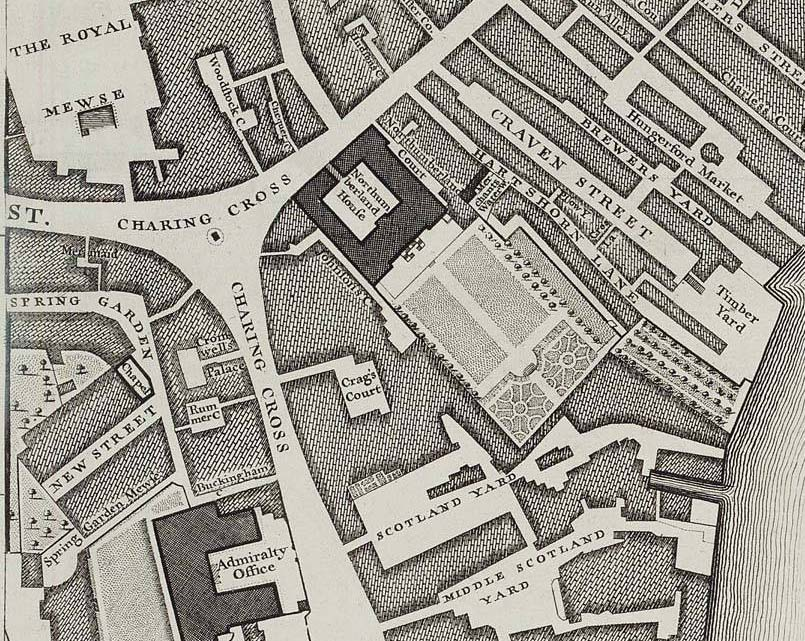
An extract from John Rocque's Map of London, 1746, showing Northumberland House. The two projecting garden wings had not yet been added.

At some time between 1232 and 1236, the Chapel and Hospital of St Mary Rounceval was founded at Charing. It occupied land at the corner of the modern Whitehall and into the centre of Northumberland Avenue, running down to a wharf by the river. It was an Augustinian house, tied to a mother house at Roncesvalles in the Pyrenees. The house and lands were seized for the king in 1379, under a statute "for the forfeiture of the lands of schismatic aliens". Protracted legal action returned some rights to the prior, but in 1414, Henry V suppressed the 'alien' houses. The priory fell into a long decline from lack of money and arguments regarding the collection of tithes with the parish church of St Martin-in-the-Fields. In 1541, religious artefacts were removed to St Margaret's, and the chapel was adapted as a private house; its almshouse were sequestered to the Royal Palace.

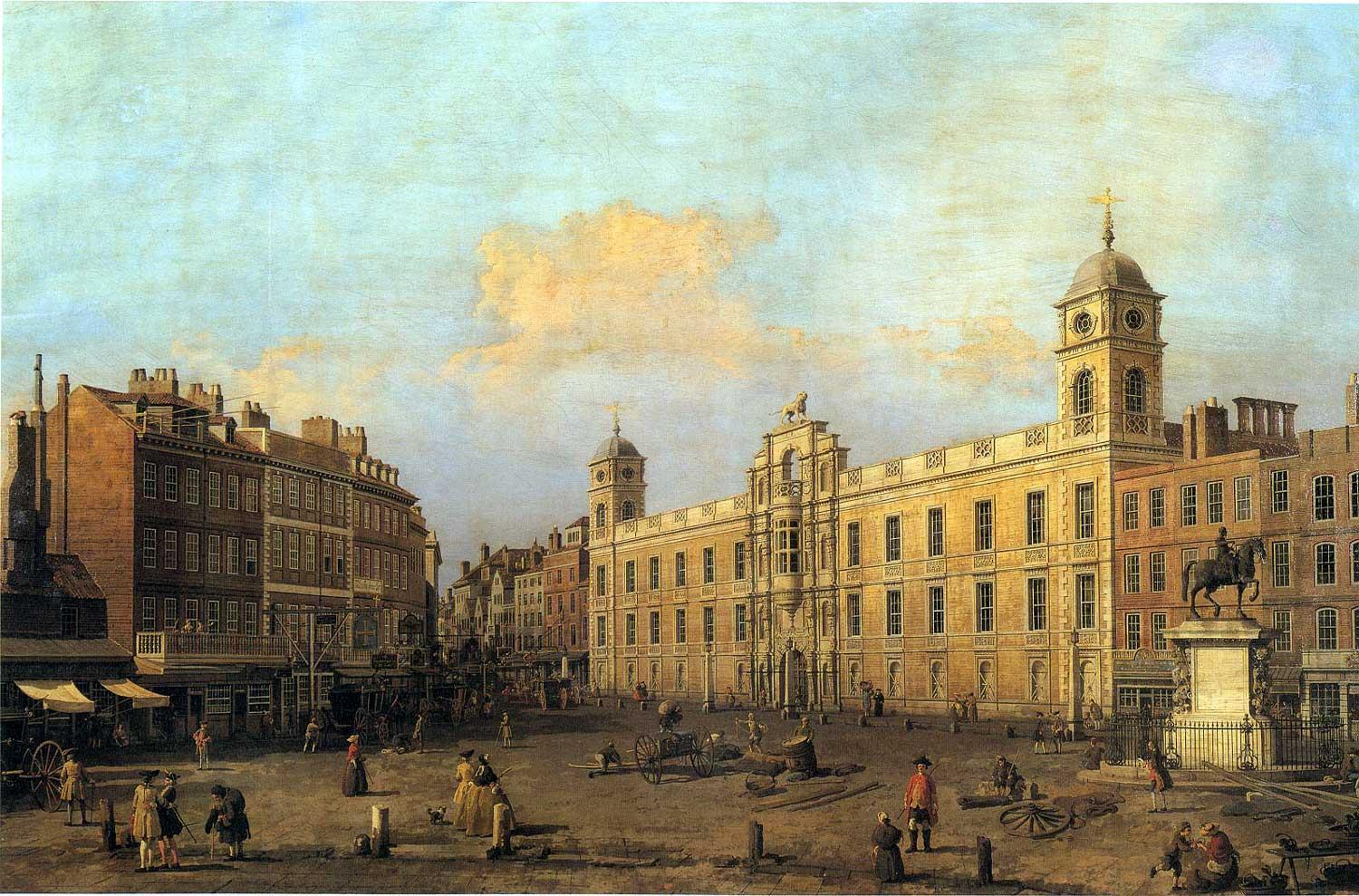
Frontage onto Strand/Charing Cross of Northumberland House in 1752 by Canaletto. The statue of Charles I is at the right of the painting. At the left is the Golden Cross Inn, with signboard outside.

In 1608–09, the Earl of Northampton built Northumberland House on the eastern portion of the property. In June 1874, the duke's property at Charing Cross was purchased by the Metropolitan Board of Works for the formation of Northumberland Avenue.

The frontage of the Rounceval property caused the narrowing at the end of the Whitehall entry to Charing Cross, and formed the section of Whitehall formerly known as Charing Cross, until road widening in the 1930s caused the rebuilding of the south side of the street which created a wide thoroughfare.

=== Battle ===
In 1554, Charing Cross was the site of the final battle of Wyatt's Rebellion. This was an attempt by Thomas Wyatt and others to overthrow Queen Mary I of England, soon after her accession to the throne. Wyatt's army had come from Kent, and with London Bridge barred to them, had crossed the river by what was then the next bridge upstream, at Hampton Court. Their circuitous route brought them down St Martin's Lane to Whitehall.

The palace was defended by 1000 men under Sir John Gage at Charing Cross; they retreated within Whitehall after firing their shot, causing consternation within, thinking the force had changed sides. The rebels – themselves fearful of artillery on the higher ground around St James's – did not press their attack and marched on to Ludgate, where they were met by the Tower Garrison and surrendered.

=== Civil war removal ===
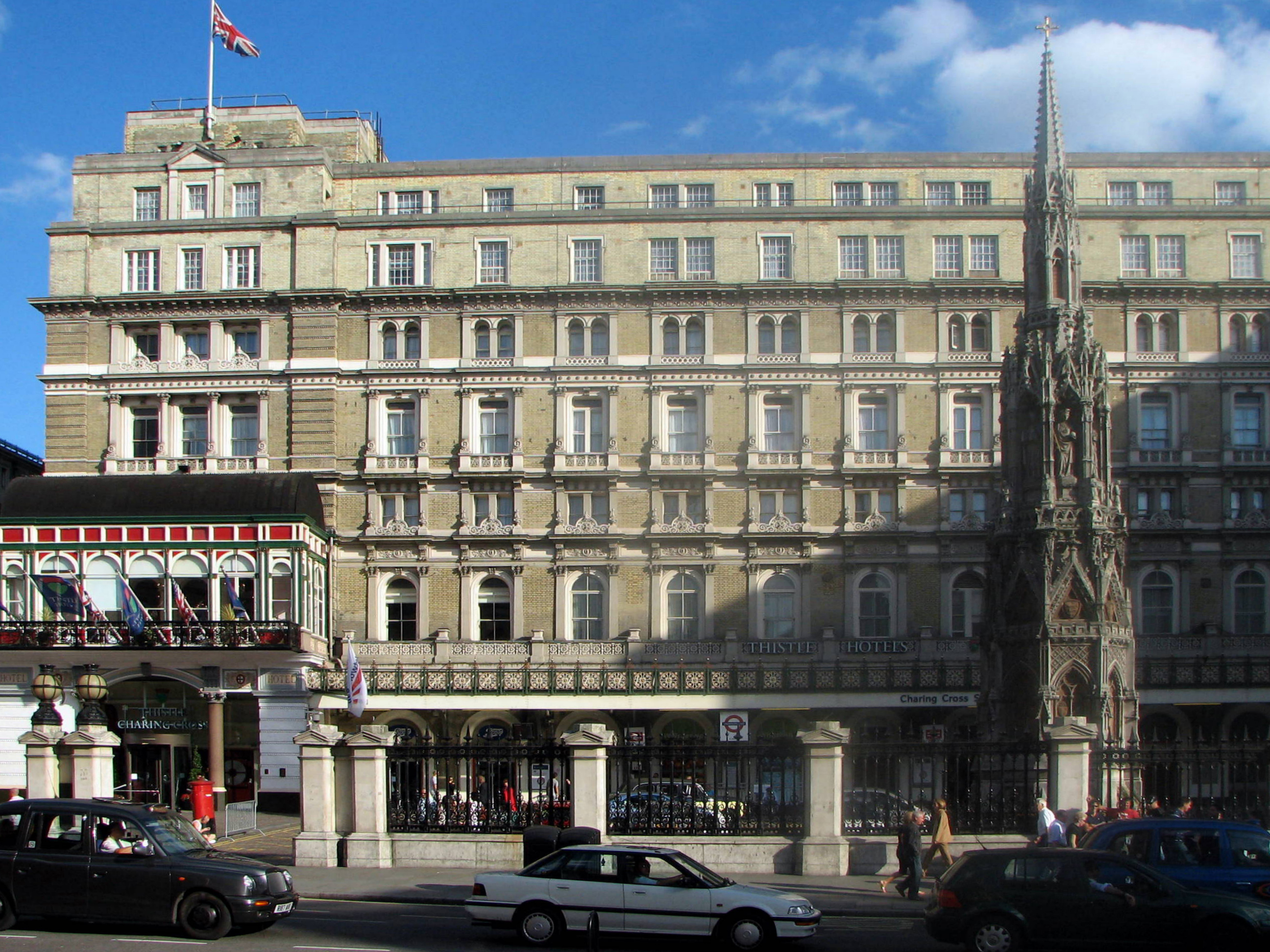
The Victorian replacement of the original Eleanor Cross 200 metres (200 yards) away, along the Strand in front of Charing Cross Station/Hotel. The area derives its name from the original monument destroyed by Parliament in the 1600s; the memorial replacement dates from the 1800s.

The Eleanor Cross was pulled down, by order of Parliament, in 1647, at the time of the English Civil War, becoming the subject of a popular Royalist ballad:

Methinks the common-council shou'd
Of it have taken pity,
'Cause, good old cross, it always stood
So firmly in the city.
Since crosses you so much disdain,
Faith, if I were you,
For fear the King should rule again,
I'd pull down Tiburn too.

— Extract from "The Downfall of Charing Cross"

At the Restoration (1660) eight of the regicides were executed here, including the notable Fifth Monarchist, Colonel Thomas Harrison. A statue of Charles I was, likewise in Charles II's reign, erected on the site. This had been made in 1633 by Hubert Le Sueur, in the reign of Charles I, but in 1649 Parliament ordered a man to destroy it; however he instead hid it and brought it back to the new King, Charles II (Charles I's son), and his Parliament who had the statue erected here in 1675.

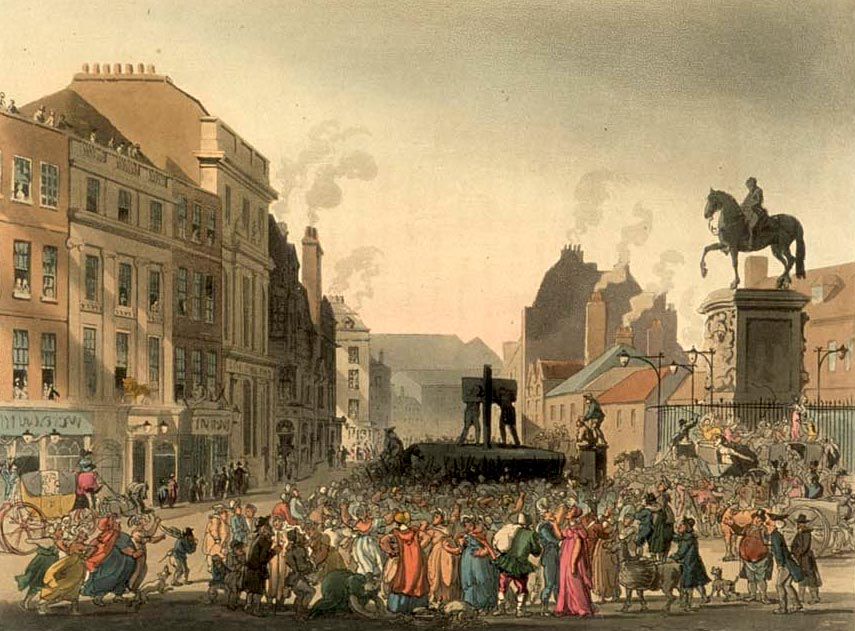
The Pillory at Charing Cross (1809). The dark equestrian statue is the junction centrepiece (marker). This is a drawing by Augustus Pugin and Thomas Rowlandson for Rudolph Ackermann's Microcosm of London (1808–11).

A prominent pillory, where malefactors were publicly flogged, stood alongside for centuries. About 200 yards to the east was the Hungerford Market, established at the end of the 16th century; and to the north was the King's Mews, or Royal Mews, the stables for the Palace of Whitehall and thus the King's own presence at the Houses of Parliament (Palace of Westminster). The whole area of the broad pavements of what was a three-way main junction with private (stables) turn-off was a popular place of street entertainment. Samuel Pepys records in his diaries visiting the taverns and watching the entertainments and executions that were held there. This was combined with the south of the mews when Trafalgar Square was built on the site in 1832, the rest of the stable yard becoming the National Gallery primarily.

A major London coaching inn, the "Golden Cross" – first mentioned in 1643 – faced this junction. From here, in the eighteenth and nineteenth centuries, coaches linked variously terminuses of: Dover, Brighton, Bath, Bristol, Cambridge, Holyhead and York. The inn features in Sketches by Boz, David Copperfield and The Pickwick Papers by Charles Dickens. In the latter, the dangers to public safety of the quite low archway to access the inn's coaching yard were memorably pointed out by Mr Jingle:

"Heads, heads – take care of your heads", cried the loquacious stranger as they came out under the low archway which in those days formed the entrance to the coachyard. "Terrible place – dangerous work – other day – five children – mother – tall lady, eating sandwiches – forgot the arch – crash – knock – children look round – mother's head off – sandwich in her hand – no mouth to put it in – head of family off."

The story echoes an accident of 11 April 1800, when the Chatham and Rochester coach was emerging from the gateway of the Golden Cross, and "a young woman, sitting on the top, threw her head back, to prevent her striking against the beam; but there being so much luggage on the roof of the coach as to hinder her laying herself sufficiently back, it caught her face, and tore the flesh in a dreadful manner."

The inn and its yard, pillory, and what remained of the Royal Mews, made way for Trafalgar Square, and a new Golden Cross Hotel was built in the 1830s on the triangular block fronted by South Africa House. A nod to this is made by some offices on the Strand, in a building named Golden Cross House.

=== Cross memorial ===
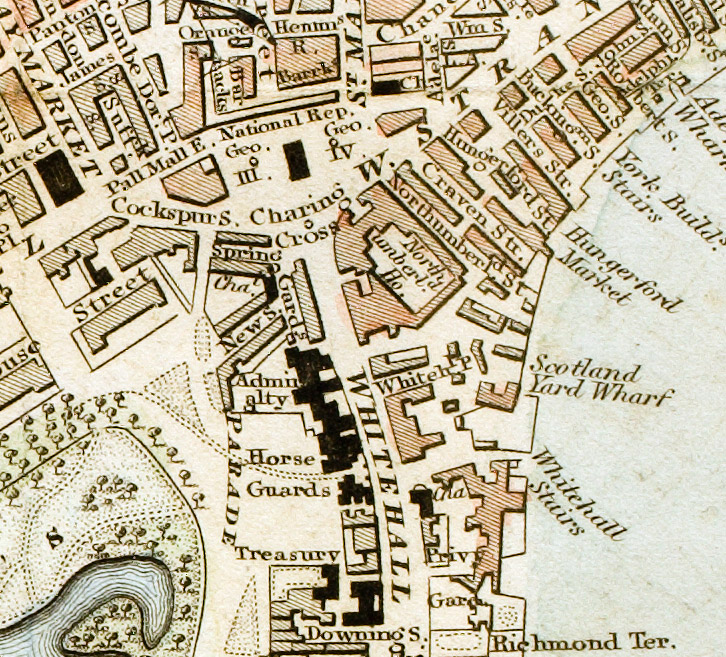
The area around Charing Cross, 1833

A map showing the Charing Cross ward of Westminster Metropolitan Borough in 1916

The railway station opened in 1864, fronted on the Strand with the Charing Cross Hotel. In 1865, a replacement cross was commissioned from E. M. Barry by the South Eastern Railway as the centrepiece of the station forecourt. It is not a replica, being of an ornate Victorian Gothic design based on George Gilbert Scott's Oxford Martyrs' Memorial (1838). The Cross rises 70 feet (21 m) in three main stages on an octagonal plan, surmounted by a spire and cross. The shields in the panels of the first stage are copied from the Eleanor Crosses and bear the arms of England, Castile, Leon and Ponthieu; above the 2nd parapet are eight statues of Queen Eleanor. The Cross was designated a Grade II* monument on 5 February 1970. The month before, the bronze equestrian statue of Charles, on a pedestal of carved Portland stone, was given Grade I listed protection.

The rebuilding of a monument to resemble the one lost under Cromwell's low church Britain took place in 1864 in Britain's main era of medieval revivalism. The next year the memorial was completed and Cardinal Wiseman died, having been appointed the first Archbishop of Westminster in 1850, with many Anglican churches also having restored or re-created their medieval ornamentations by the end of the century. By this time England was the epicentre of the Gothic Revival. It was intertwined with deeply philosophical movements associated with a re-awakening of "High Church" or Anglo-Catholic self-belief (and by the Catholic convert Augustus Welby Pugin) concerned by the growth of religious nonconformism.

The cross, having been revived, gave its name to a railway station, a tube station, a police station, a hospital, a hotel, a theatre, and a music hall (which had lain beneath the arches of the railway station). Charing Cross Road, the main route from the north (which became the east side of Trafalgar Square), was named after the railway station, itself a major destination for traffic, rather than after the original cross.

== Official use as central point ==
By the late 18th century, the Charing Cross district was increasingly coming to be perceived as the "centre" of the metropolis (supplanting the traditional heartland of the City to the east). From the early 19th century, legislation applicable only to the London metropolis used Charing Cross as a central point to define its geographical scope. Its later use in legislation waned in favour of providing a schedule of local government areas and became mostly obsolete with the creation of Greater London in 1965.

Use	Scope
Hackney carriage (colloquially London cab/taxi) licensing and The Knowledge	The London Hackney Carriage Act 1831 and other Acts set the radius within which licensed London cabs illuminated or otherwise advertising for business had to take a fare (and convey passengers). The legacy of this is that streets within a six-mile radius of Charing Cross are the basis of 'black taxi' driver training. Such cabs can turn down exceptionally long journeys.
Metropolitan Police District	The Metropolitan Police Act 1829 stated all parishes within 12 miles of Charing Cross could be added. This was expanded to 15 miles by the Metropolitan Police Act 1839. It has since been harmonised to Greater London, as to stations and main conurbations.
Metropolitan Buildings Office	The Office (superseded in 1855 and today by each local authority's Building Control departments or teams) could regulate use and building standards under the London Building Act 1844, within 12 miles of Charing Cross
Street trading	The Metropolitan Streets Act 1856 gave the Commissioner of Metropolitan Police power to control some acts within six miles of Charing Cross. Powers to license shoeblack pitches remain, heavily superseded by the London boroughs' street trading licensing laws.
Amateur radio	Transmissions in the range 431–432 MHz are banned for amateur radio use within 100 km (62 miles) of Charing Cross.

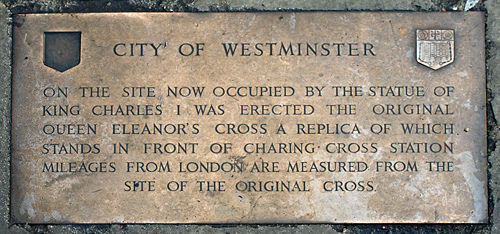
A plaque by the statue of Charles I, stating that "Mileages from London are measured from the site of the original Cross"

Road distances from London continue to be measured from Charing Cross. Prior to its selection as a commonly agreed central datum point, various points were used for this purpose. John Ogilby's Britannia of 1675, of which editions and derivations continued to be published throughout the 18th century, used the "Standard" (a former conduit head) in Cornhill; while John Cary's New Itinerary of 1798 used the General Post Office in Lombard Street.

The milestones on the main turnpike roads were mostly measured from their terminus which was peripheral to the free-passage urban, London roads. Ten of these are notable: Hyde Park Corner, Whitechapel Church, the southern end of London Bridge, the east end of Westminster Bridge, Shoreditch Church, Tyburn Turnpike (Marble Arch), Holborn Bars, St Giles's Pound, Hicks Hall (as to the Great North Road), and the Stones' End in The Borough. Some roads into Surrey and Sussex were measured from St Mary-le-Bow church in the City. Some of these structures were later moved or destroyed, but reference to them persisted as if they still remained in place. An exaggerated but well-meaning criticism was that "all the Books of Roads ... published, differ in the Situation of Mile Stones, and instead of being a Guide to the Traveller, serve only to confound him".

William Camden speculated in 1586 that Roman roads in Britain had been measured from London Stone, a claim thus widely repeated, but unsupported by archaeological or other evidence.

== Transport ==
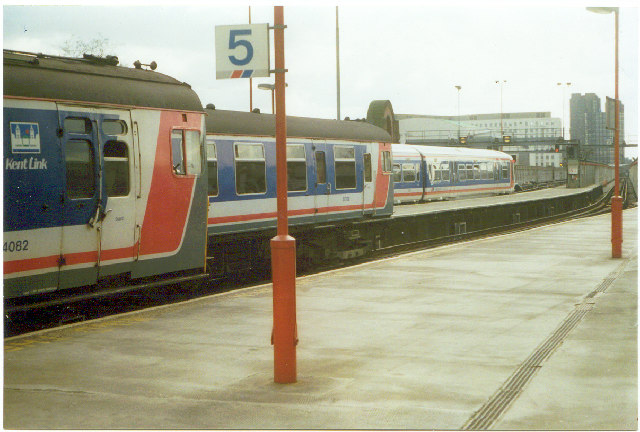
Charing Cross station in 1994, with Network SouthEast trains

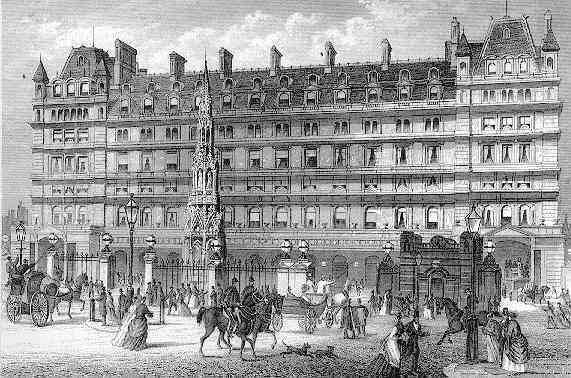
The front entrance of Charing Cross railway station in a 19th-century print. The cross in front of the station Hotel is a Victorian replacement for the original Eleanor Cross which stood near the site.

To the east of the Charing Cross road junction is Charing Cross railway station, situated on the Strand. On the other side of the river, connected by the pedestrian Golden Jubilee Bridges, are Waterloo East and Waterloo stations.

The nearest London Underground stations are Charing Cross and Embankment.
