= The Standard, Cornhill =

Former London water pump and point of reference

Coordinates: 51.5134°N 0.0841°W

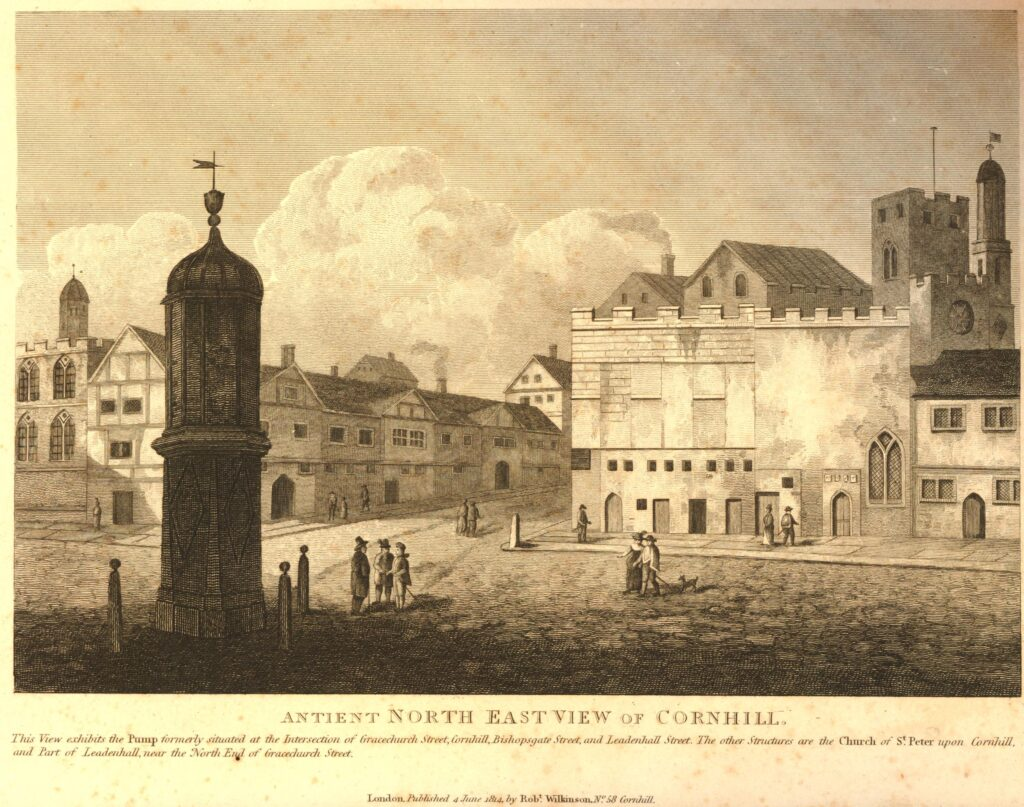
1834 illustration of how Cornhill would have appeared, the Standard is visible on the left.

The Standard, Cornhill was a water standard that stood on Cornhill in London. It was for a time occasionally used as a reference point for distances measured from London. Today such a role is filled by Charing Cross.

== History ==
There are references to a "standard" in Cornhill that may have stood as early as the 14th or 15th centuries. The most recent Standard was set up in 1582 by Peter Morris. It stood on a significant junction between Cornhill and Bishopsgate Street just east of another conduit which had been set up in 13th century. It was fed by water from the Thames which was carried through lead pipes. Sometimes known as the "waste pumpe" its water flowed from four spouts to clean the channels of the streets it stood between.

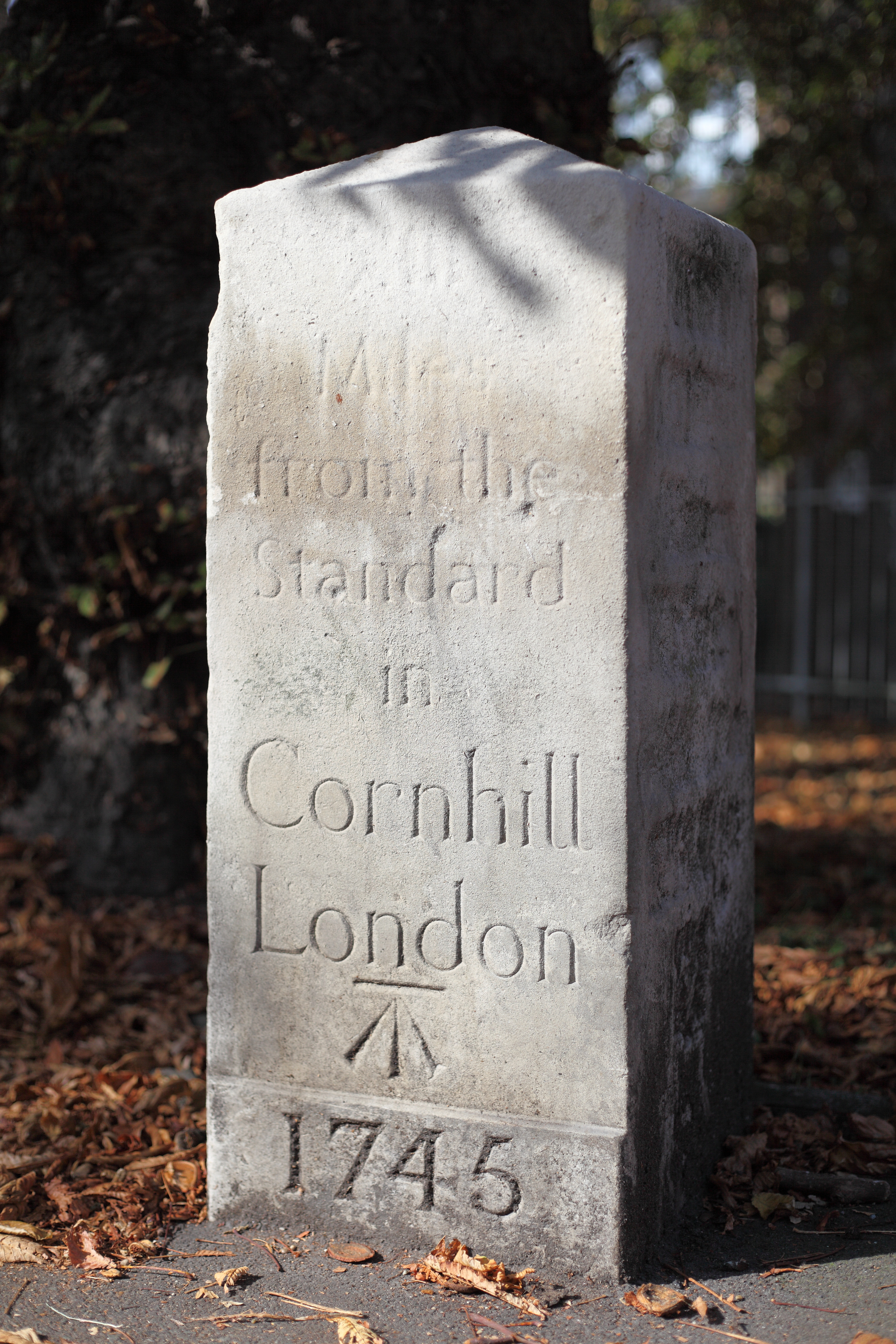
A milestone on Brighton Road, Sutton. Erected in 1745, the distance is still measured from the Standard.

The conduit stopped functioning some time between 1598 and 1603. It stood for a few decades afterwards until it was removed in 1674.

=== Use as a reference point ===
The conduit was regularly used as a point of reference for measuring distances from London, this included in maps and milestones.

Despite its removal in the 17th century it would still occasionally be used for such a purpose. For example, a milestone which was erected in Mortlake in 1751 bears an inscription with reference to the Standard. By the early 19th century, Charing Cross was more generally used for such a purpose, despite its location outside "The City". It retains this purpose for modern maps and road signs.

A City of London plaque is affixed to a wall on the junction where the Standard would have stood.
