= Drummonds Bank =

Formerly independent private bank in London, England

Coordinates: 51.5069°N 0.1278°W

Messrs. Drummond, Bankers

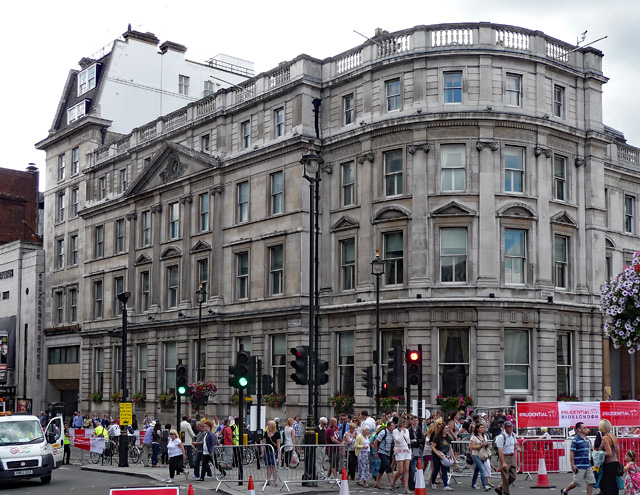
- Type: Division
- Industry: Private banking
- Founded: 1717; 309 years ago
- Headquarters: 49 Charing Cross; London SW1A 2DX
- Products: Wealth management
- Parent: Royal Bank of Scotland
- Website: Drummonds on NatWest Heritage Hub

Messrs. Drummond, Bankers is a formerly independent private bank in the United Kingdom that is now part of NatWest Group. The Royal Bank of Scotland incorporating Messrs Drummond, Bankers is based at 49 Charing Cross in central London. Drummonds is authorised as a brand of The Royal Bank of Scotland by the Prudential Regulation Authority.

== History ==
Andrew Drummond (1688–1769), a goldsmith, founded the bank in 1717. The bank remained within the Drummond family until 1924, when it became known as the Drummonds Branch of the Royal Bank of Scotland. The bank was the Royal Bank's first acquisition south of the Scottish border and continued to be managed by a board of local directors until the 1960s.

In 1992, RBS Holt's branch in Whitehall was absorbed by the London Drummonds branch; it continues to operate as Holt's Military Banking, based in Farnborough, offering personal banking tailored to the needs of navy, army and air force officers. At the same time, the Royal Bank of Scotland revived Drummonds as a specialist in private banking.

The bank offers a variety of services to its private clients, including wealth and asset management. It has been based at its headquarters since 1760. Prior to 1758, the site was occupied by the townhouse, Naunton House. In 1758 the Westminster Bridge Commissioners purchased Naunton House and its neighbouring houses, for the purpose of widening the street. The surplus property was sold to Drummonds for £1,100. The building was reconstructed from 1877 to 1881; Admiralty Arch was built and The Mall laid out nearby shortly after. The building is listed Grade II on Historic England's register of listed buildings.

The bank's focus on wealth management led it to create a specialised department for UK National Lottery winners separate from its more traditional practices.

== Clients ==
As is tradition with most London private banks, account holders' identities are kept a bank secret. Some historical clients have though been revealed, including a variety of distinguished figures: HM King George III and other members of the royal family, Alexander Pope, Benjamin Disraeli, Beau Brummell, Isambard Kingdom Brunel, Robert and James Adam, Capability Brown, Laurence Llewelyn-Bowen,Josiah Wedgwood, and Thomas Gainsborough. The bank also holds accounts for organisations and institutions such as the Conservative Party and Royal Academy.

== Royal account holders ==
Both Coutts & Co. and Drummonds have received royal patronage. King George III moved his account from Coutts to Drummonds during his reign as he was displeased with Coutts for bankrolling the Prince of Wales from his personal account. Messrs Drummond & Co. honoured the wishes of the King, but when the Prince of Wales became King George IV in 1820, he moved the royal account back to Coutts. More recent known members of the royal family to bank at Drummonds include the late Queen Elizabeth The Queen Mother, who was distantly related to the founding Drummond family.

== See also ==
- Holt's Military Banking
- Coutts & Co.
