= Commercial Bank of Scotland =

Scottish commercial bank

The Commercial Bank of Scotland
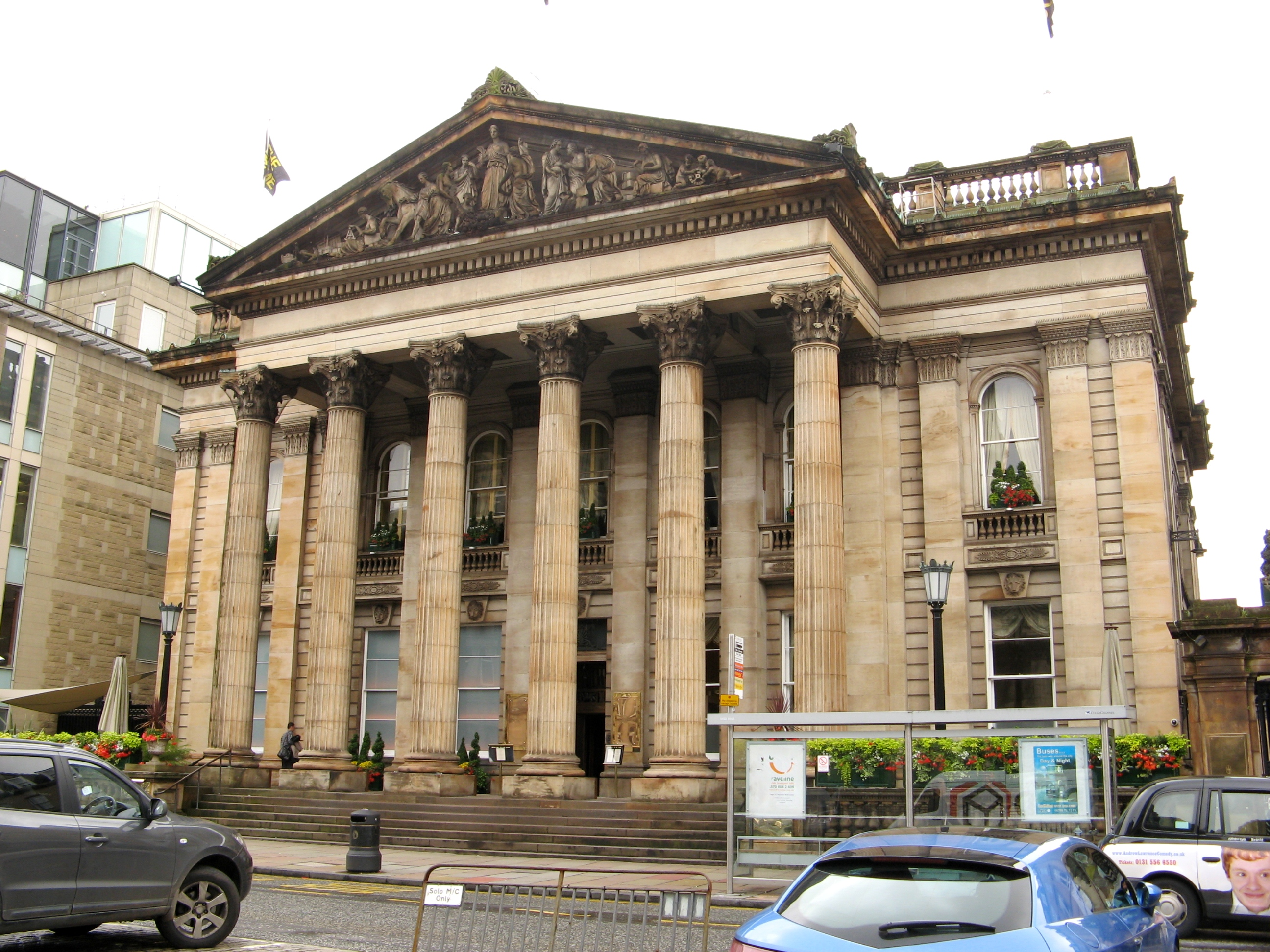
- Former headquarters of the Commercial Bank of Scotland on George Street, Edinburgh
- Industry: financial service activities, except insurance and pension funding
- Founded: 1810
- Defunct: 1958
- Fate: Merged with the National Bank of Scotland
- Successor: National Commercial Bank of Scotland
- Headquarters: Edinburgh, Scotland. UK

The Commercial Bank of Scotland Ltd. was a commercial bank. It was founded in Edinburgh, Scotland, in 1810, and obtained a royal charter in 1831. It grew substantially through the 19th and early 20th centuries, until 1958, when it merged with the National Bank of Scotland to become the National Commercial Bank of Scotland. Ten years later the National Commercial Bank merged with the Royal Bank of Scotland.

== History ==
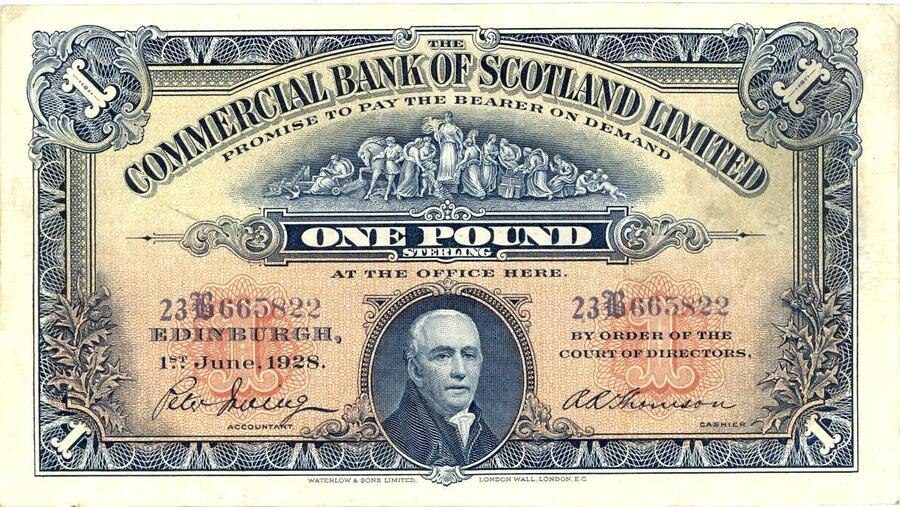

=== Formation ===
The Commercial Bank of Scotland was formed in 1810 in response to public dissatisfaction with the three charter banks (Bank of Scotland, British Linen Bank and The Royal Bank of Scotland): "it was felt by many of the Scottish people that the three old Banks had become too ... devoted to their own interests ... to be the real promoters of the general good." Checkland argued that the project was "without precedent" for the proposed joint stock company relied not on a restricted group of wealthy men but on "a very large group of investors, including those of more modest means, numbered in hundreds, distributed throughout Scotland".

The original bank premises were created by David Sandeman at 22 Picardy Place at the head of Leith Walk in Edinburgh.

=== The early years ===
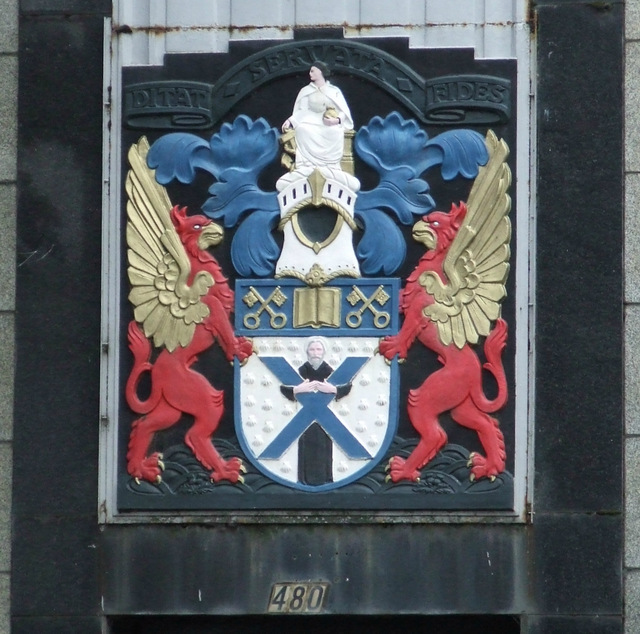

It was always the intention to create a national branch structure and Bank's note issue was used as a form of early advertising: "it was the policy of the directors to arrange for note `circulators` throughout the country as a preliminary to actual agencies, the object being to familiarize the general public with the new Bank". The Commercial enjoyed immediate success and within twelve months it was "doing a fair proportion of the Banking business in Edinburgh and Leith", and had five branches outside the City. Within two years there were 11 branches and 30 by 1830. This success was despite the first manager having no banking experience and being "slow to learn" to the extent that he was removed in little more than a year. His successor, Alexander MacArtney, had been trained by private bankers and "was a man of real depth and ability".

In the late 1830s, a sizeable sum was stolen from the bank during a major highway robbery in Armadale, when the stagecoach between Glasgow and Edinburgh was robbed by four assailants. In the robbery, some £6000 in notes, gold and silver coins was stolen from a cargo trunk belonging to the bank. Two of the robbers, George Gilchrist and George Davidson were found guilty of the robbery and sentenced to death. While Gilchrist was hanged in public on 3 August 1831, Davidson managed to escape with the aid of relatives and escaped on a ship, eventually settling in New York.

The bank had been keen to obtain a royal charter from the outset but it did not succeed until 1831. The title figure chosen to be the nominal head of the bank was James Maitland, 8th Earl of Lauderdale, the first of four Earls of Lauderdale to serve as governor over a period of fifty years.

In 1834, after several years of success, they built a hugely impressive new headquarters on George Street in Edinburgh, designed by David Rhind.

=== Branch expansion ===
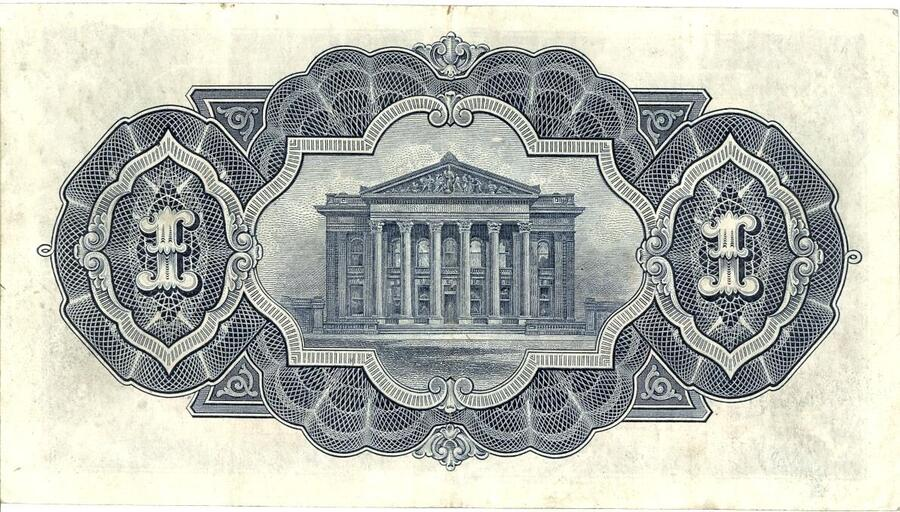

Although "still anxious to extend branches" MacArtney proposed that the bank investigate the possibility of acquiring distressed provincial banking businesses. In 1826, the bank duly acquired the sole-partner Caithness Bank in Wick. With the exception of the two-office Arbroath Bank in 1844, that was the limit of the bank's acquisitions. From then on the story of the Commercial Bank was of steady organic expansion, accelerating as the century progressed: from 56 in 1860, the number of branches rose to 127 in 1890 and 167 in 1910, the bank's centenary. The bank's relative success towards the end of its century was emphasised by its rise from fifth place in 1895 in terms of deposits to second place in 1914. However, one area where the bank lagged was that it was the last of the seven large banks to open a London office – not done until 1883.

=== Amalgamation ===
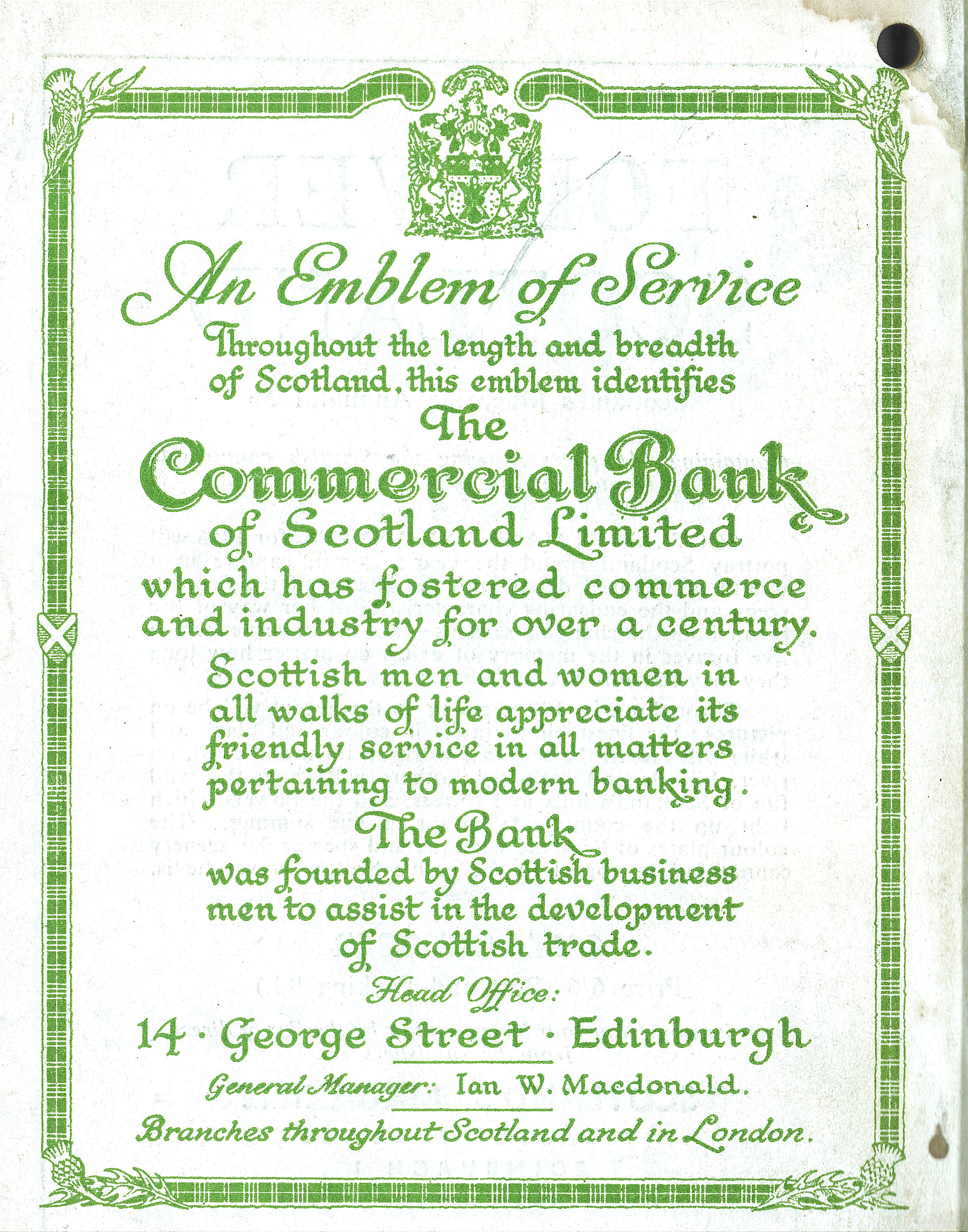

The inter-war period saw continued branch expansion, the number rising from 240 in 1920 to 385 in 1940 when it owned the largest network in Scotland. However, the post-war period was one of radical change for Scottish banks with mergers and fresh links with English Banks. In 1953 an outsider, Ian Macdonald, had been appointed general manager of the Commercial. He presided over a bank "that had been particularly aggressive in branch formation…with somewhat modest capital". Macdonald set out a ten-year programme both to find an amalgamation partner and to diversify. The diversification came in the form of hire purchase and in 1954 the Commercial became the first British bank to enter the hire purchase business when it acquired the Scottish Midland Guarantee Trust.

Finding a new partner took longer. Discussions with British Linen came to naught but then Lloyds Bank approached the Commercial offering to sell its 100% holding in the National Bank of Scotland in return for a minority stake in the enlarged entity; the merger took place in 1958 creating the National Commercial Bank of Scotland.
