= National Bank of Scotland =

Bank based in Edinburgh, Scotland

The National Bank of Scotland
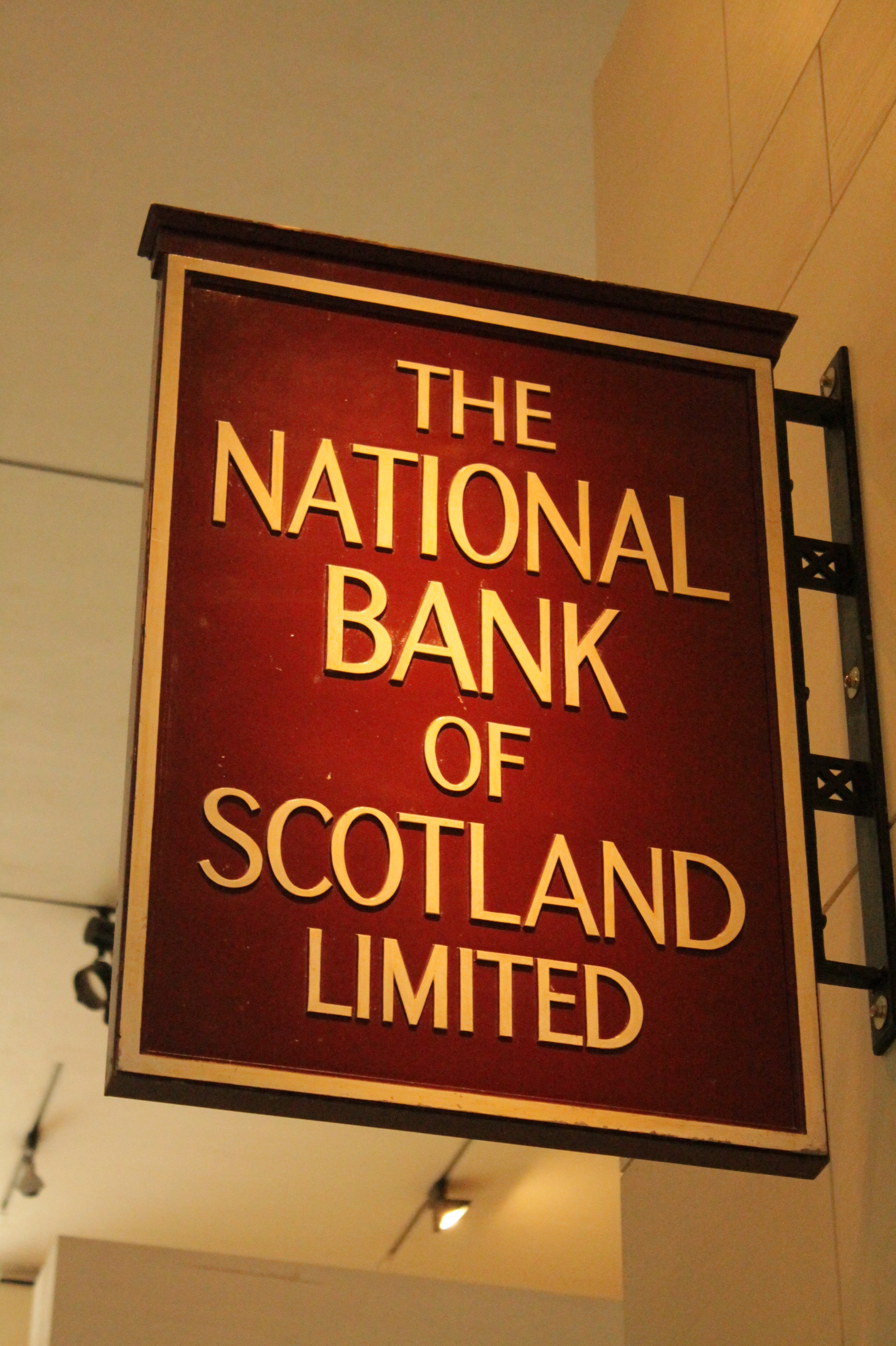
- Sign for National Bank of Scotland, National Museum of Scotland
- Industry: financial service activities, except insurance and pension funding
- Founded: 1824
- Defunct: 1958
- Fate: Merged with the Commercial Bank of Scotland
- Successor: National Commercial Bank of Scotland
- Headquarters: Edinburgh, Scotland

The National Bank of Scotland was founded as a joint stock bank in 1825. Based in Edinburgh, it had established a network of 137 branches at the end of its first hundred years. In 1918 the bank was bought by Lloyds Bank, although it continued to operate as an independent institution until 1959, when it merged with the Commercial Bank of Scotland to become the National Commercial Bank of Scotland. Ten years later the National Commercial Bank merged with the Royal Bank of Scotland.

== The first hundred years ==
In December 1824, the National Bank of Scotland announced that funds had been raised for the formation of a new bank in Edinburgh. Almost immediately it was followed by advertisements from the Scottish Union Banking Company and the Scottish Union Commercial Banking Company stating that they were to follow suit. Negotiations followed whereby the promoters of the latter two banks agreed to join in with the promoters of the National Bank. In March 1825 the National Bank was formally constituted with a nominal capital of £5 million under the chairmanship of the Lord Provost, Alexander Henderson of Press. The bank finally opened for business in the October and immediately began to issue its own notes. It obtained a royal charter in 1831. The founding directors included John Macfie, a sugar-refiner in Leith.

The "National" in the Bank's title was no accident. "From its inception the policy of the bank was directed towards the establishment of a branch system throughout Scotland." By the end of its first full year there were 13 branches; 40 by 1850 and 112 by the end of the century. It was also the first Scottish bank to open an office in London (1864). From 1885 to 1914 it was second only in size to the Bank of Scotland.

Although most of the increase in branches came from new openings, there were some small acquisitions including the Commercial Banking Company of Aberdeen in 1833; and the Perth Union Bank in 1836. It was the National's failure to buy the Glasgow & Ship Bank in 1843 that prompted the opening of the first branch in Glasgow. A Bank of Glasgow company was also formed in 1843 and was acquired by the National in 1844 but the evidence from Checkland was that no physical presence had been established and it was no more than a paper transaction prior to a pooling of resources.

The banking industry was (and still appears to be) continually afflicted by crises but there is no indication in the histories of anything other than stable financial progress. A table published in 1898 saw annual published net profits between 1864 and 1896 remaining within the range of £100,000–200,000; the opening year was £125,000 and the closing year £198,000.

== Part of Lloyds ==
In the early twentieth century the English banks were beginning to look north of the border and in 1918 Lloyds Bank acquired the National Bank. The architect Philip McManus of T.P. Marwick & Sons designed a striking moderne temporary headquarters building for the bank on George Street in 1937, and Lloyds allowed the National to continue operating independently until 1959. At that point the Commercial Bank of Scotland approached Lloyds with a view to a merger. Lloyds agreed to dispose of its 100% holding in the National Bank and the two Scottish banks merged to become the National Commercial Bank of Scotland; Lloyds was left with a 37% stake in the enlarged bank.

The National Bank became the first commercial bank in the world to offer a mobile banking service, which was established on the Isle of Lewis in 1946. In 1947 a new headquarters building was opened in St. Andrew Square, designed in an American-inspired style by Leslie Grahame Thomson with Arthur Joseph Davis.
