= National Commercial Bank of Scotland =

Defunct Scottish commercial bank that was merged into the Royal Bank of Scotland

The National Commercial Bank of Scotland Ltd. was a Scottish commercial bank. It was established in 1959 through a merger of the National Bank of Scotland (established in 1825) with the Commercial Bank of Scotland (established in 1810). Ten years later it merged with the Royal Bank of Scotland, to become the largest clearing bank in Scotland. The National Commercial Bank issued its own banknotes.

At its foundation, the National Commercial Bank of Scotland had assets of around £300 million, and had 476 branches in Scotland and England. A joint venture with asset management company Schroders in 1964 saw the launch of a Scottish merchant banking service. The bank acquired the 36 English and Welsh branches of The National Bank Ltd., when the Irish operations of that institution were bought by the Bank of Ireland in 1966. The National Commercial Bank also established a "ladies branch" for female customers, staffed entirely by women.

By 1969 economic conditions were becoming more difficult for the banking sector. In response, the National Commercial Bank merged with the Royal Bank of Scotland. The resulting company had 662 branches. The merger resulted in a new holding company, National & Commercial Banking Group Ltd. The English and Welsh branches were reorganised as Williams & Glyn's Bank, while the Scottish branches transferred to the Royal Bank name. The holding company was renamed Royal Bank of Scotland Group in 1979 and NatWest Group in 2020.
