= James Bowdoin =

American politician (1726–1790)

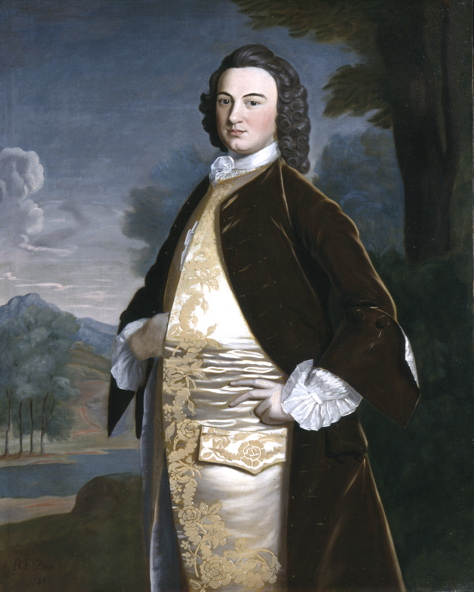
- Portrait by Robert Feke, c. 1748

2nd Governor of Massachusetts
- In office May 27, 1785 – May 30, 1787
- Lieutenant: Thomas Cushing
- Preceded by: Thomas Cushing (as acting governor)
- Succeeded by: John Hancock

Personal details
- Born: August 7, 1726 Boston, Massachusetts
- Died: November 6, 1790 (aged 64) Boston, Massachusetts
- Spouse: Elizabeth Erving (m. 1748)
- Children: 2
- Profession: Politician

James Bowdoin II (/ˈboʊdɪn/ BOH-din; August 7, 1726 – November 6, 1790) was an American politician and merchant who served as governor of Massachusetts from 1785 to 1787. Born in Boston in what was then colonial Massachusetts into a wealthy mercantile family, he rose to prominence by following his father's career. Between the 1750s and 1770s Bowdoin served in both branches of the Massachusetts General Court, where he was initially a supporter of the colony's royal governors before opposing British policy towards its North American colonies and eventually becoming an prominent advocate of colonial independence. Bowdoin authored a highly politicized report on the 1770 Boston Massacre which has been described as one of the most influential pieces of writing that shaped colonial public opinion.

From 1775 to 1777, Bowdoin served as president of the Massachusetts Provincial Congress's executive council, the de facto head of the Massachusetts government during the American Revolutionary War. He was elected president of the Constitutional Convention that drafted the state's constitution in 1779, and ran unsuccessfully for governor in 1780, losing to John Hancock. In 1785, following Hancock's resignation, Bowdoin was elected governor. Due to the large debts Massachusetts incurred from the Revolutionary War, he ran on a platform of fiscal responsibility. During his two years in office, a combination of poor economic conditions and the harsh fiscal policy laid down by Bowdoin's administration led to Shays' Rebellion. Bowdoin personally funded militia forces that were instrumental in putting down the uprising. His high-handed treatment of the rebels may have contributed to his loss of the 1787 election, in which the populist Hancock was returned to office.

In addition to his political activities, Bowdoin was active in scientific pursuits, collaborating with Benjamin Franklin in his pioneering research on electricity. He was elected as a fellow of the Royal Society and was elected a member of the American Philosophical Society in 1787. He was a founder and first president of the American Academy of Arts and Sciences, to whom he bequeathed his library. Bowdoin College in Maine was named in his honor after a bequest by his son James Bowdoin III.

== Early life ==
1736 portrait of Bowdoin by John Smibert

James Bowdoin II was born in Boston to Hannah Portage Bowdoin and James Bowdoin, a wealthy Boston merchant. His grandfather, Pierre Baudouin, was a Huguenot refugee from France. Pierre took his family first to Ireland, then to eastern Massachusetts (present-day Maine), before finally settling in Boston in 1690. James Bowdoin I had a modest inheritance from his parents, but greatly expanded his father's merchant business and land holdings to become one of the wealthiest men in the province. Young James attended the South Grammar School (now Boston Latin School), then graduated from Harvard College in 1745. When his father died in 1747, he inherited a considerable fortune. He married Elizabeth Erving, sister of his Harvard roommate, in 1748. They had two children. That same year, he received his master's degree from Harvard.

== Scientific and other pursuits ==
Bowdoin may have met Benjamin Franklin as early as 1743, and the two became frequent collaborators and correspondents on scientific subjects. During his Harvard years, he was educated in the sciences by John Winthrop, and developed an interest in electricity and astronomy. In 1750, Bowdoin traveled to Philadelphia to meet with Franklin. Bowdoin was interested in Franklin's experiments on electricity, and Franklin solicited his advice on papers he prepared for submission to the Royal Society. Through the offices of Franklin, some of Bowdoin's letters were read to the Society. Bowdoin was instrumental in gaining support in the provincial assembly for an expedition to Newfoundland to observe the 1761 transit of Venus across the sun, and in the same year published a treatise suggesting improvements to the telescope. In 1785 he published a series of memoirs arguing against Isaac Newton's theory that light was transmitted by "corpuscles", citing both natural observations and Scripture.

Bowdoin maintained a lifelong interest in the sciences. In 1780 he was one of the founders of the American Academy of Arts and Sciences. He served as its first president until his death and left the society his library. Bowdoin published not only scientific papers, but poetry in both English and Latin. He was awarded an honorary doctorate by the University of Edinburgh and made a fellow of Harvard. His 1788 election to the Royal Society of London was the first such honor bestowed on an American after independence.

Bowdoin also had extensive business interests. Although he was often characterized as a merchant, and he engaged in the Atlantic trade, his principal interest was in land. His inheritance included major tracts of land, most of which he kept, in present-day Maine as well as in the agriculturally rich Elizabeth Islands off the state's south coast. Bowdoin expanded his holdings, eventually acquiring property in all of the New England states except Rhode Island. He was one of the managing proprietors of a large territory on the Kennebec River, where he was frequently involved in legal proceedings with squatters on the land, and with competing land interests. The dealings with squatters in particular left Bowdoin with a dislike of the lower classes in Massachusetts society, something that affected his politics. His inheritance also included an ironworks in Attleboro (now Bridgewater) that he sold in 1770, apparently because it was too time-consuming to manage. Despite the upheavals of the Revolution, Bowdoin was careful to always manage his financial affairs. He supported the cause of independence financially, but he did so without damaging his own business interests, unlike John Hancock, whose business suffered from neglect.

In later years he served as the first president of the Massachusetts Bank in 1784 and was also the first president of the Massachusetts Humane Society (an organization initially devoted to rescuing survivors from shipwrecks and other water-based disasters).

== Governor's Council and opposition to British rule ==
Bowdoin's coat of arms

Bowdoin was elected to the provincial assembly in 1753 and served there until named to the governor's council in 1756. Although at first supportive of the royal governor, his politics became more radical as British colonial policy became increasingly unpopular, and Bowdoin believed those policies would have a negative effect on the New England economy. Personal factors may also have played a role in Bowdoin's shift in views: John Temple, the local customs commissioner and Bowdoin's son in law, was embroiled in nasty disputes with Governor Francis Bernard in the 1760s. By 1769 Bowdoin was one of the principal spokesmen of the opposition to the governor on the council. In that year Bernard rejected Bowdoin's renewed election to the council. Bowdoin, however, was instrumental in causing Bernard's downfall from office. Private letters critical of the provincial government that Bernard had written were published in 1769 to great outrage. Bowdoin rebutted the charges and claims made in Bernard's letters, and published a highly polemic pamphlet arguing for Bernard's removal that was sent to the colonial secretary, Lord Hillsborough.

Bowdoin won reelection to the assembly in 1770, and was promptly reelected to the council the same year, soon after Bernard left the province. Acting Governor Thomas Hutchinson acquiesced to Bowdoin's return to the council, reasoning that he was less dangerous there than as an outspoken critic in the lower house. However, the seat Bowdoin vacated in the assembly was taken by Samuel Adams, another leading political opponent of the royal governors, and Hutchinson was faced with the prospect of opposition on both fronts.

After the Boston Massacre on March 5, 1770, Bowdoin was chosen by the Boston town meeting to serve on a committee that investigated the affair. The committee took depositions and produced a report describing the event that was published as A Short Narrative of the Horrid Massacre. The work was highly critical not only of the governor, but also the behavior of the British regulars occupying Boston, and is characterized by historian Francis Walett as one of the major propaganda pieces influencing public opinion in the colonies. Bowdoin's opposition to British policies continued during the Hutchinson administration, and when letters by Hutchinson were published to outrage similar to the Bernard letters affair, Bowdoin again penned works highly critical of the governor and calling for his removal. Hutchinson's successor, General Thomas Gage, vetoed Bowdoin's reelection to the council in 1774, citing "express orders from His Majesty" that he be excluded from that body.

== Government of Massachusetts ==
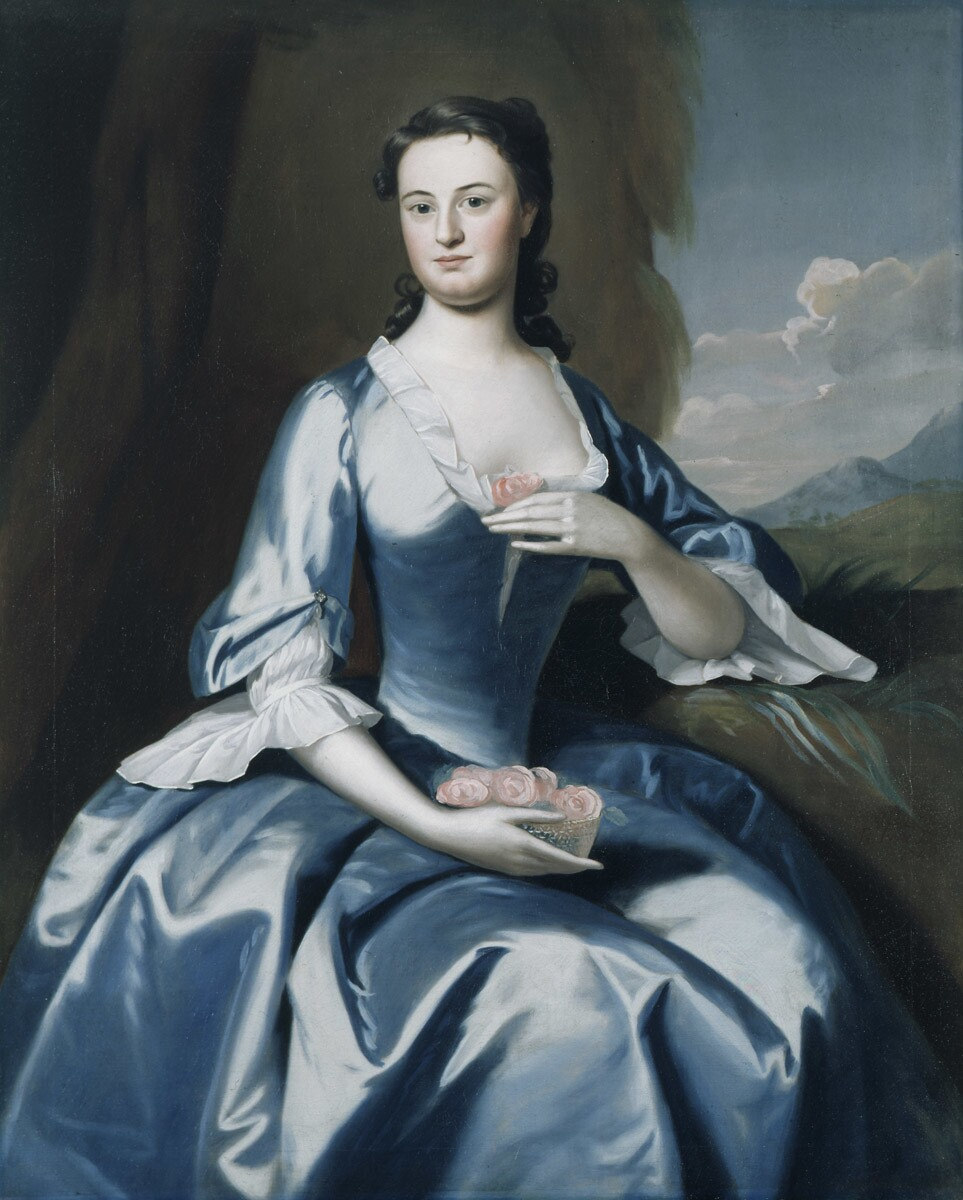
1748 portrait of Bowdoin's wife Elizabeth by Robert Feke

Bowdoin as named as a delegate to the First Continental Congress in 1774 but did not attend, citing Elizabeth's poor health. A bout of poor health, probably caused by tuberculosis, at the time also affected him. Bowdoin was again ill in 1775 when the American Revolutionary War broke out, and the family was relocated from British-occupied Boston (which was then under siege by area militia) first to Dorchester, and eventually to Middleborough, where he resided until 1778. (Bowdoin's Beacon Street mansion was occupied by General John Burgoyne.) Despite his convalescence he was kept apprised of events occurring in and around Boston, and was elected president of the executive council of the Massachusetts Provincial Congress. This position, which he held until 1777, made him the de facto head of the Massachusetts government. Citing his ongoing poor health, he resigned the post and withdrew from public view. He continued to correspond with other revolutionaries, and enjoyed their confidence, although his absence from the war effort would lead to later political difficulties. He began to return to public life in 1778, and when Massachusetts wrote its own constitution in 1779, he was president of the Constitutional Convention called to create it, and chairman of the committee that drafted it. John Adams, also a committee member, is generally credited as the major author of the new constitution, although Bowdoin and Samuel Adams likely made significant contributions.

In the first gubernatorial election, held in 1780, Bowdoin ran for the office against John Hancock. In the absence of formal party politics, the contest was one of personality, popularity, and patriotism. Hancock was immensely popular, and unquestionably patriotic given his personal sacrifices and his leadership of the Second Continental Congress. Bowdoin was cast by Hancock supporters as unpatriotic, citing among other things his refusal to serve in the First Continental Congress (even though it was due to his illness). Bowdoin's supporters, who were principally well-off commercial interests from Massachusetts coastal communities, cast Hancock as a foppish demagogue who pandered to the populace. Hancock won the election easily, receiving more than 90% of the vote. The Massachusetts House of Representatives offered Bowdoin either the lieutenant governorship or a seat in the state senate, but Bowdoin declined both on account of his poor health. After the election Hancock appointed him to a commission to revise and consolidate the state's laws.

Bowdoin ran against Hancock in subsequent elections, but was never able to overcome Hancock's enormous popularity. The contest between the two men was just one element of a long-running rivalry that encompassed business, politics, and religion, and was apparently deeply personal. The two men were both involved in the administration of Harvard, where their feud sometimes became ugly. For example, in 1776, while Hancock was simultaneously treasurer of Harvard and president of the Second Continental Congress, a committee headed by Bowdoin decided that securities physically held by Hancock were at risk because of the war, and a delegation was sent to Philadelphia to receive an accounting of them and physical custody of the papers. Hancock's dilatory responses and refusal to produce an accounting of the college books dragged on for several years, as a result of which Bowdoin orchestrated his censure by the Harvard board of overseers. The matter reached a peak of sorts in 1783 when the college's issues with Hancock were read and discussed in an open meeting at which Hancock was the presiding officer. Both Bowdoin and Hancock attended the Brattle Street Church, where they competed with each other over the size and quality of the improvements to the building (and even the location of a new one) that they funded. James Warren captured the differences between the two men: "I don't envy either of them their feelings. the Vanity of one will Sting like an Adder if it is disappointed, and the Advancements made by the other if they dont succeed will hurt his Modest pride." The rivalry between the men was so bitter that the founding of Bowdoin College, named in his honor, had to be delayed until after Hancock died.

In 1785, apparently sensitive to rising unrest in western Massachusetts over the poor economy, Hancock offered to resign, expecting to be asked to stay in office. However, the legislature made no such request, and he eventually did resign, pleading poor health. The gubernatorial race that year was dominated by Bowdoin, Lieutenant Governor Thomas Cushing (who was widely viewed as a stand-in for Hancock but lacked his charisma), and Revolutionary War General Benjamin Lincoln. The campaign was at times nasty. Bowdoin and Samuel Adams went after the Hancock-Cushing faction, seizing on the recently established and locally controversial social club (known either as "Sans Souci" or the "Tea Assembly"), at which card play and dancing took place (these activities had previously been banned in socially conservative Boston), as a sign of moral decay that took place under Hancock's term. Cushing supporters accused Bowdoin of cowardice in the war and insulting the people for refusing the lieutenant governorship in 1780. The electorate gave no candidate a majority, and the General Court ended up choosing Bowdoin over the others in bitterly divisive voting.

=== Shays' Rebellion ===
19th-century portrait of Bowdoin

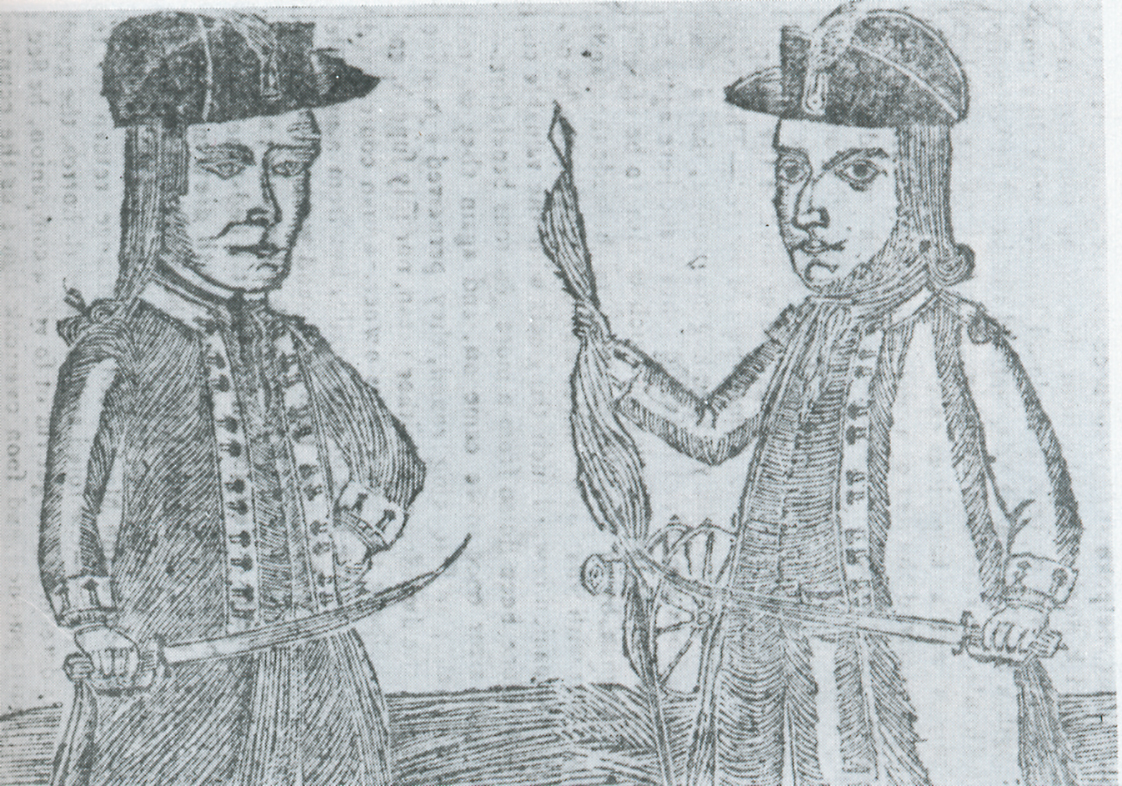
Contemporary woodcut depicts two leaders of Shays' Rebellion, Daniel Shays and Job Shattuck

Hancock had, during his time in office, refused to vigorously act to collect delinquent taxes. Bowdoin, seeking to make payments the state owed against the nation's foreign debt, raised taxes and stepped up collection of back taxes. These actions, which were combined with a general post-war economic depression and a credit squeeze caused by a shortage of hard currency, wrought havoc throughout the rural parts of the state. Conventions organized in the rural parts of the state submitted letters of protest to the state legislature, which was dominated by Bowdoin and the conservative wholesale merchants of the coastal portions of the state.

After the legislature adjourned on July 18, 1786, without substantively addressing these complaints, rural Massachusetts protestors organized direct action, and began protest marches that shut down the state's court system, which enforced tax and civil forfeiture judgments and had become a focus of the discontent. Bowdoin issued a proclamation in early September denouncing these actions, but took no overt steps to immediately organize a militia response (unlike governors in neighboring Connecticut and New Hampshire). When the foreclosure court in Worcester was shut down by similar action on September 5, the county militia (composed mainly of men sympathetic to the protestors) refused to turn out, much to Bowdoin's chagrin. The closure of the Worcester court was followed by closings in Concord and Taunton, and when the militia marched into Great Barrington to force court open there, one of the Judges, William Whiting asked the militiamen to take sides. 800 of the 1,000 men took the people's side of the road. By October, one correspondent wrote, "We are now in a state of Anarchy and Confusion bordering on Civil War".

These court closings mirrored closings in 1774, when colonists had shut down the King's business everywhere west of Boston. Fearing a new Revolution, and continuing to ignore the farmers' petitions, Bowdoin and Samuel Adams and their legislature enacted a Riot Act, suspended habeas corpus, and passed a bill that unsuccessfully attempted to address the financial reasons for the protests. By January 1787, the protests, which began as demands for reform, had grown to become a direct attack on the "tyrannical government of Massachusetts". Hampshire County in particular (which then included what are now Hampden and Franklin Counties) had become a hotbed of rebellion, with leaders like Daniel Shays and Luke Day beginning to organize for an attack on government institutions.

Because the federal government had been unable to raise any significant number of troops and Bowdoin could no longer trust local militias in the western counties, he proposed in early January 1787 the creation of a private militia to be funded by eastern merchants. Revolutionary War General Benjamin Lincoln raised funds and men for the effort, and had 3,000 men in Worcester by January 19. A standoff at the Springfield Armory on January 25 resulted in the death of several rebels, and Lincoln broke the main rebel force on February 4 in Petersham, ending large-scale resistance.

The same day that Lincoln arrived at Petersham, the state legislature passed bills authorizing a state of martial law, giving the governor broad powers to act against the rebels. It also authorized state payments to reimburse Lincoln and the merchants who had funded the army, and authorized the recruitment of additional militia. On February 12 the legislature passed the Disqualification Act, seeking to prevent a legislative response by rebel sympathizers. This bill expressly forbade any acknowledged rebels from holding a variety of elected and appointed offices.

The crushing of the rebellion and the harsh terms of reconciliation imposed by the Disqualification Act all worked against Governor Bowdoin politically. In the election held in April 1787, Bowdoin received few votes from the rural parts of the state and was trounced by John Hancock.

In 1788 Bowdoin served as a member of the Massachusetts convention that ratified the United States Constitution. A strong supporter of Federalism, Bowdoin worked hard for its ratification, bringing a skeptical Samuel Adams and his supporters into the fold by inviting him to a dinner with other pro-ratification delegates, and offering Federalist support to John Hancock in future elections. Bowdoin's Federalist supporters backed Hancock in the 1789 election, even though Bowdoin also stood for election. He remained active in his charitable and scientific pursuits in his later years, continuing his leadership of the American Academy of Arts and Sciences as well as that of the Humane Society. He also continued to engage in new business ventures, buying in 1789 an interest in one of the first American merchant ships to sail to China.

== Death and legacy ==
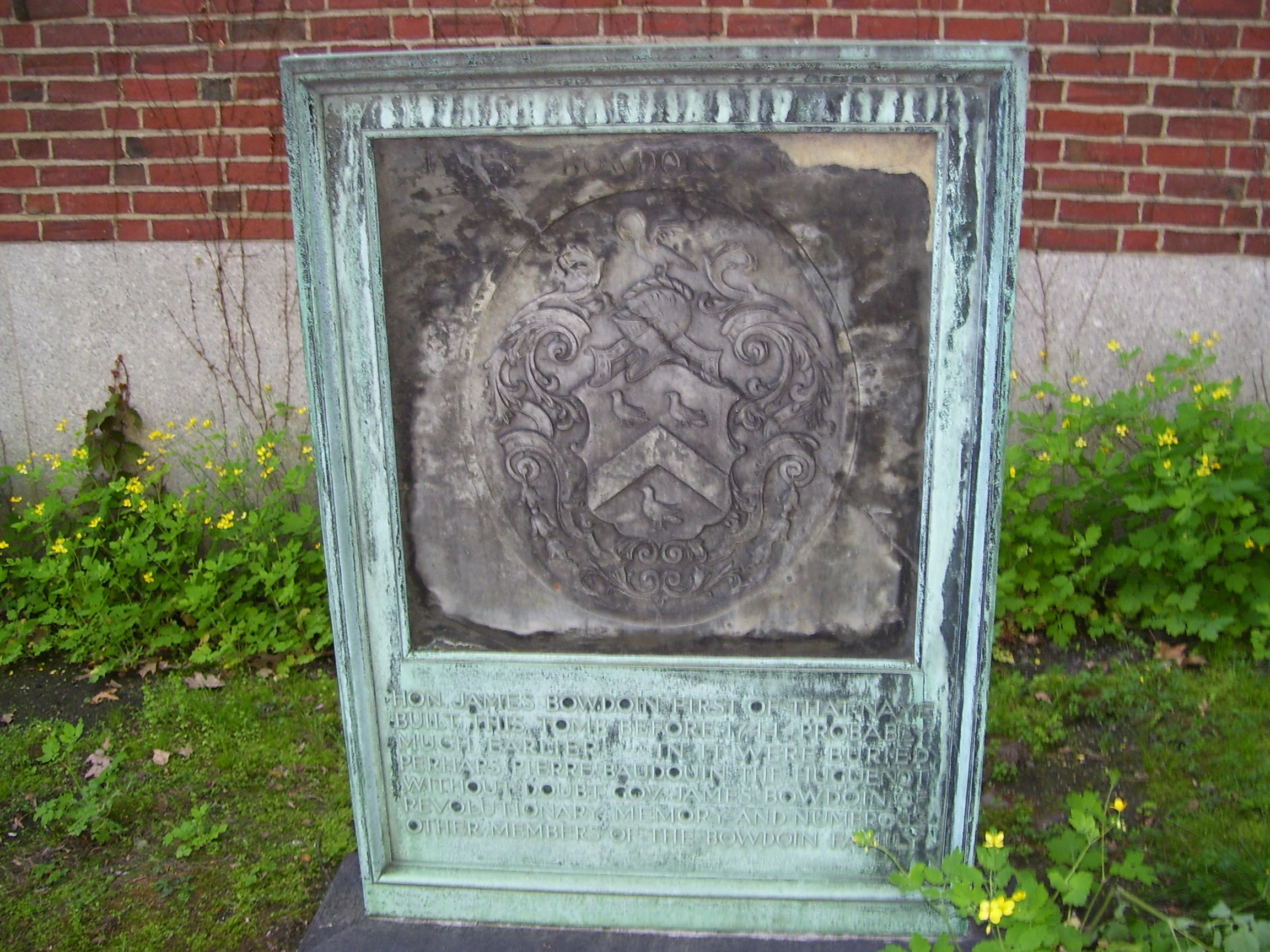
Bowdoin's tomb in the Granary Burying Ground

He died in Boston on November 6, 1790, of "putrid fever and dysentery". Bowdoin's funeral was one of the largest of the time in Boston, with people lining the streets to view the funeral procession. He was interred in Boston's Granary Burying Ground. Among his bequests was a gift to Harvard College for awards that are now known as the Bowdoin Prizes. His son James III donated lands from the family estate in Brunswick, Maine, as well as funds and books, to establish Bowdoin College in his honor.

An orrery constructed by clockmaker Joseph Pope, now in Harvard's science department, includes bronze figures of Bowdoin and Benjamin Franklin that were supposedly cast by Paul Revere. (Bowdoin was responsible for having the device rescued when Pope's house caught fire in 1787.)

Landmarks bearing the Bowdoin name in Boston include Bowdoin Street, Bowdoin Square, and the Bowdoin MBTA station. Bowdoin, Maine, incorporated 1788, was named for Bowdoin; neighboring Bowdoinham, Maine (incorporated 1762) was named either for his grandfather Pierre or his brother William.

== Footnotes ==
Political offices
Preceded by Thomas Cushing as acting governor	Governor of Massachusetts; 1785–1787	Succeeded by John Hancock
