= Conkey's Tavern =

Coordinates: 42.39°N 72.36°W

Conkey's Tavern was built in 1758 by William Conkey in Pelham, Massachusetts. It is particularly famous as the place where Daniel Shays met with his followers and plotted his famous rebellion against the Massachusetts Government in 1786/1787.

The location of the tavern is now submerged under the Quabbin Reservoir.
