= Conky =

Conky may refer to:

- Conky (software), a computer software used for system monitoring
- Conky, a hand puppet used by Bubbles on Trailer Park Boys
  - "Conky", an episode of Trailer Park Boys

== See also ==
- Conky 2000, a robot on Pee-wee's Playhouse
- Conkey, a surname
- Konqi, the green dragon mascot for the KDE community
