= James Warren (politician) =

American merchant, politician and military officer (1726–1808)

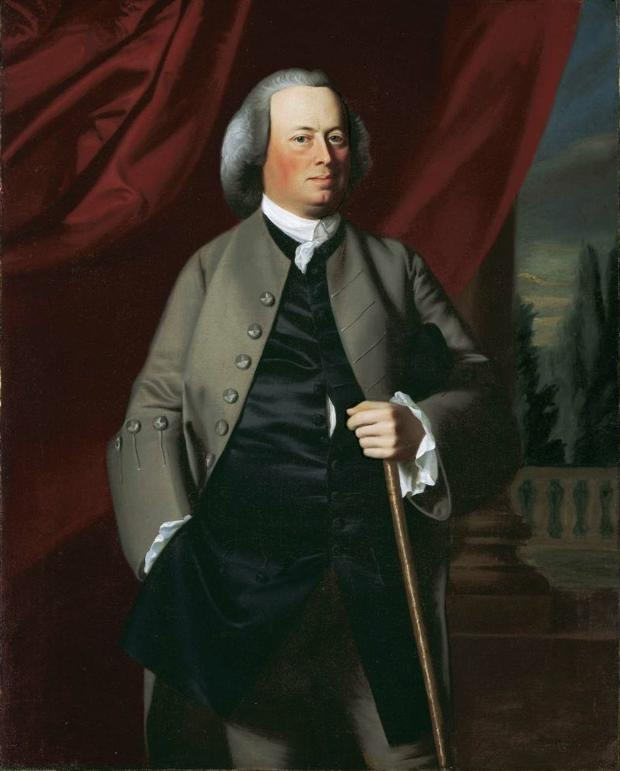
- Portrait by John Singleton Copley, c. 1763

President of the Massachusetts Provincial Congress
- In office June 18, 1775 – October 25, 1780
- Preceded by: Joseph Warren
- Succeeded by: Caleb Davis (as Speaker)

Speaker of the Massachusetts House of Representatives
- In office 1787–1788
- Preceded by: Artemas Ward
- Succeeded by: Theodore Sedgwick

Personal details
- Born: September 28, 1726 Plymouth, Province of Massachusetts Bay
- Died: November 28, 1808 (aged 82) Plymouth, Massachusetts
- Spouse: Mercy Otis (m. 1754)
- Children: 5

Military service
- Allegiance: United States
- Branch/service: Continental Army (1775–1776)
- Rank: Major general
- Battles/wars: Revolutionary War; Boston campaign

Major General James Warren (September 28, 1726 – November 28, 1808) was an American merchant, politician and military officer who served as the speaker of the Massachusetts House of Representatives from 1787 to 1788. An advocate of colonial resistance to British parliamentary acts in the American Revolution, Warren served as the Continental Army's Paymaster-General during the Revolutionary War before pursuing a political career.

Born in Plymouth, Massachusetts to an affluent New England family, Warren studied at Harvard College from 1745 to 1747 before settling down in his hometown to a career as a businessman and gentleman farmer. In 1754, Warren married Mercy Otis, who shared his republican beliefs and together they had five sons during their marriage. In 1766, Warren was elected to the Massachusetts House of Representatives, continuing to sit in the house until 1778.

As tensions gradually increased between Great Britain and its American colonies, Warren soon became a prominent supporter of the Patriot cause, jointly forming a committee of correspondence in Massachusetts. Warren was a delegate to the first Massachusetts Provincial Congress in October 1774, and also served as president of the third Provincial Congress from 1775 to 1780 after his predecessor, Joseph Warren, was killed at Bunker Hill.

Warren served in a multitude of roles during the Revolutionary War; along with serving as Paymaster-General, he also sat on the naval board of the Continental Navy from 1776 to 1781, and served as a general officer in the Massachusetts Militia for a year until he resigned in 1777. After the war, Warren was elected as a speaker in the Massachusetts General Court in 1787. Retiring from politics in 1794, he died in Plymouth fourteen years later.

== Early life ==
James Warren was born on September 28, 1726, in Plymouth, Massachusetts. His father, James Warren, was a businessman and legal official who served as the high sheriff of Plymouth County; he was also a captain in the provincial militia. Warren's mother was Penelope Winslow, who married her husband in 1724. Warren was born into a prominent New England family which descended from a Mayflower passenger, Richard Warren.

The young Warren was raised on the family farm, which was located near the Eel River. Beginning in 1742, he attended Harvard College, graduating in 1745 with a BA degree. While studying at Harvard, Warren, who excelled at his studies, developed "strong feelings about how the colonies should be governed". Warren also befriended future Massachusetts Attorney General and soldier James Otis Jr., who was studying at Harvard as well.

Warren returned to Plymouth after graduating from Harvard, settling down there to a career as a merchant and gentleman farmer. On November 14, 1754, Warren married his second cousin, 26-year old Mercy Otis, the only daughter of James Otis Sr; the marriage was the culmination of a six-year long engagement between the two. After marrying at the Otis family residence, the two settled down on a homestead in Plymouth that Warren had bought in 1755.

== American Revolution ==
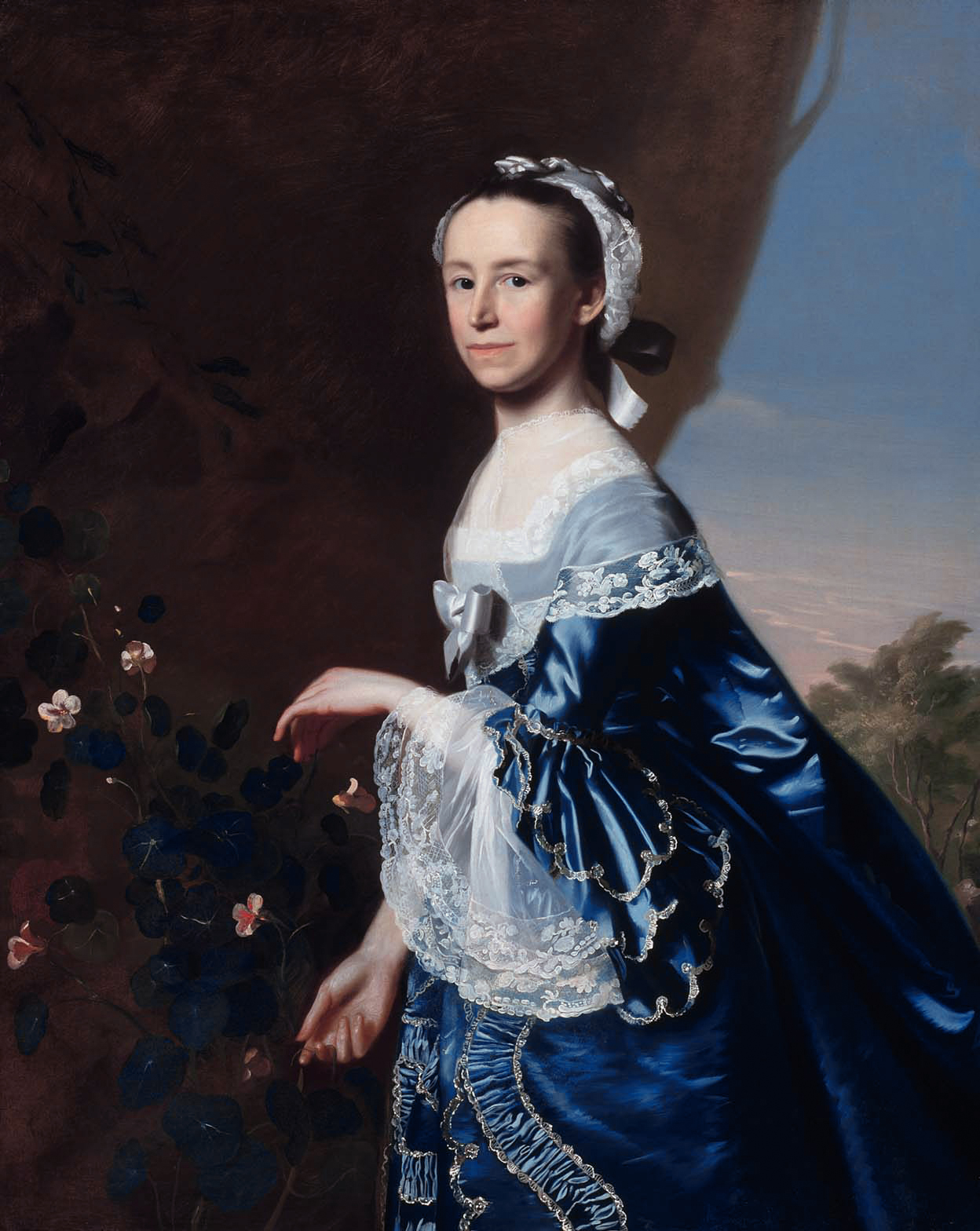
A portrait of Mercy Otis Warren by John Singleton Copley c. 1763

In 1757, after his father died, Warren succeeded to his position as the high sheriff of Plymouth County. Warren and Mercy moved back to his family estate in the same year, where she gave birth to a son who they named James after his father. This took place amidst a backdrop of increasing tensions between Great Britain and its North American colonies, with colonists protesting several unpopular acts passed by the British Parliament.

A small group of American Patriots, including Warren, gathered at his family home in 1765 to discuss what the colonial response should be to the Stamp Act, which had been passed by the British Parliament to increase tax revenues from the Thirteen Colonies. The group agreed that selected representatives from each of the Thirteen Colonies should gather in New York City and write a petition to King George III requesting that he repeal the act.

While the colonists awaited a response from the King, Warren was elected to the Massachusetts House of Representatives in 1766, continuing to sit in the house until 1778. During this period, he began to associate with prominent Patriots, such as James Otis Jr., John Adams, and Samuel Adams. In 1772, Warren, along with Mercy, Adams and Joseph Warren and others, formed a Massachusetts committee of correspondence in response to the Gaspee Affair.

Warren continued to involve himself in efforts to resist British parliamentary acts targeting the colonies, assuming prominent roles in political and mercantile demonstrations by Patriots (such as the Boston Tea Party), writing that "the People should strike some bold stroke and try the Issue." In a letter Warren wrote to John Adams in 1775, he stated, "I am content to move in a small sphere. I expect no distinction but that of an honest man who has exerted every nerve."

In October 1774, Warren served as a delegate to the first Massachusetts Provincial Congress. Open conflict broke out between British and Patriot forces in 1775 following the battles of Lexington and Concord. After Joseph Warren was killed in action fighting British Army forces at the battle of Bunker Hill on June 17, Warren succeeded him as president of the Massachusetts Provincial Congress, continuing to hold that position until the congress was dissolved in 1780.

== Revolutionary War and death ==
During the early stages of the American Revolutionary War, Warren served as Paymaster-General of the Continental Army from July 27, 1775 to April 19, 1776 after being appointed to the position by the Continental Congress. For his services, Warren was paid a salary of 100 dollars a month. He also served as a military officer in the Continental Army while they were stationed at Cambridge and Boston in 1775 and 1776, during a campaign which saw Patriot troops successfully compel British forces to evacuate from Massachusetts.

From 1776 to 1781, Warren sat on the Eastern Department of the Continental Navy Board, overseeing the activities of the fledgling Continental Navy as they operated against Royal Navy warships stationed in North America. Warren was also appointed to the rank of major-general in the Massachusetts militia and was ordered to lead a Continental Army force into British-controlled regions in Rhode Island. However, unwilling to accept the command of an officer of a lesser rank, Warren officially resigned from the militia on August 1777, bringing an end to his nascent military career.

In 1783, the British Crown signed the Treaty of Paris, officially confirming the United States' independence. Four years later in 1787, Warren was elected "by the popular majority" to the seat of speaker of the Massachusetts House of Representatives. During his one-year long tenure, Warren's popularity waned due to his stance on currency issues and criticism of the methods used by the federal authorities to suppress Shays' Rebellion. On October 22, 1786, Warren wrote in a letter to John Adams that "We are now in a State of Anarchy and Confusion bordering on a Civil War."

Rumors spread that the Warren family had supported the rebels in the aftermath of the rebellion's suppression, forcing them to issue claims both denying that rumor along with claims that their son Winslow had joined forces with rebel leader Daniel Shays. Relations between the federal government and the Warrens became strained during this period; when Winslow's application to serve as the American consul in Lisbon, Portugal was rejected, Warren co-authored a letter with Mercy to governor of Massachusetts James Bowdoin, attacking him for refusing to support Winslow.

In 1788, Warren emerged as a leading opponent of the Constitution of the United States' ratification due to the lack of any bill of rights contained within the document, authoring several pamphlets which were published in Boston publicizing the issue; he also wrote several articles for the Independent Chronicle and the Massachusetts Centinel during this period. In 1792, Warren ran for one of the two seats in Massachusetts's 3rd congressional district, representing Barnstable and Plymouth Counties. Warren was chosen to serve on the governor's council from 1792 to 1794, but was defeated as a candidate for lieutenant governor and retired in 1794, retiring to his Plymouth estate where he died on November 27, 1808.

== Personal life and family ==
Over the course of their lives, Warren and Mercy were prominent advocates of American republicanism. Historian Murney Gerlach noted that Warren remained a "firm exponent of republicanism both during and after the period of government under the articles of confederation", visualizing his ideal political structure as being founded on "equal liberty and the happiness of mankind". The couple promoted radical elements of U.S. republicanism, even as such views became increasingly unpopular among the American general public in the decades after the Revolutionary War.

Warren was a founding member of the American Academy of Arts and Sciences, one of the oldest learned societies in the United States. However, Warren would eventually come under heavy attack from his fellow associates at the academy for his views on Shays' Rebellion; in contrast to most academy members, Warren held sympathetic views towards the rebels' grievances against the federal government, in line with his political beliefs of being "suspicious of incipient despotism". Mercy wrote that Warren bore "unprovoked abuse with the Dignity of conscious rectitude".

In the 1790s, Warren sided with the Jeffersonian democrats, which led to his relationship with John Adams becoming strained. American statesman John Quincy Adams noted that Warren "was formerly a very popular man, but of late years he has thought himself neglected by the people. His mind has been soured, and he became discontented and querulous." In 1804, Warren was selected to be a presidential elector for Massachusetts for that year's presidential election, voting for Thomas Jefferson against his opponent, Southern politician Charles Cotesworth Pinckney.

During their marriage, Warren maintained a strong relationship with his wife, encouraging her career as a playwright and treating Mercy as an intellectual equal and confidante. After Mercy gave birth to James in 1757, the couple had four more children over the next nine years: Winslow, Charles, Henry and George. After Warren's death, he was buried at Burial Hill, a burying ground in Plymouth; Mercy took the opportunity to try to repair her strained relationship with John Adams. After Mercy died on October 19, 1814, at the age of 86, she was buried at Burial Hill as well.

Legal offices
Preceded by Joseph Warren	President of the Massachusetts Provincial Congress; June 18, 1775 – October 25, 1780	Succeeded by Position abolished
Preceded by Artemas Ward	Speaker of the Massachusetts House of Representatives; 1787 – 1788	Succeeded by Theodore Sedgwick
