= Luke Day =

Continental Army officer, leader of Shays' Rebellion (1743–1801)

- Born: July 21, 1743; Springfield, Massachusetts
- Died: June 1, 1801 (aged 57); West Springfield, Massachusetts, U.S.
- Occupations: farmer, military officer
- Known for: Revolutionary War Captain; Shays' Rebellion
- Spouse: Lydia Kelsey (1762–1801) (his death)
- Children: 10 (5 survived to adulthood)

Luke Day Jr. (July 21, 1743 – June 1, 1801) was an American military officer, revolutionary, and farmer, most familiar for his leadership role in Shays' Rebellion, for which he was convicted of high treason and sentenced to death, before being pardoned by Governor John Hancock. He was referred to as the "Master Spirit" of the insurrection, and was only passed over as overall leader in favor of Daniel Shays due to the perception of overzealousness on his part, by his men. As a lieutenant, and then a captain, he served for eight years and participated in many key battles of the American Revolutionary War, including the Siege of Boston, Quebec Expedition, Battles of Saratoga, Cherry Valley massacre, Sullivan Expedition and Siege of Yorktown. After the war, he joined the prestigious Society of the Cincinnati, which included the likes of George Washington and Alexander Hamilton.

== Early life ==
Luke Day Jr. was born in 1743, in what is now West Springfield, Massachusetts, the oldest son of Luke Day, Sr. and Jerusha (Skinner) Day. He was christened 10 days later at the First Congregational Church.

On August 20, 1762, he announced his intention of marriage to Lydia Kelsey, originally of Killingworth Township, Connecticut, then of Westfield, Massachusetts, daughter of Stephen Kelsey, Jr. and Lydia (Noble) Kelsey, and they married soon after. The Days and Kelseys had ties going back at least to the founding of Hartford, CT, where Robert Day and William Kelsey were neighbors. Luke and Lydia had ten children, although only five, four sons and a daughter, survived to adulthood.

Luke was referred to as a Gentleman, and was well-educated. He was deeply religious and sought counsel from both his minister and the Bible itself for the grievances of the people. In particular, he was inspired by this Bible passage:

Behold the tears of such as were oppressed, and they had no comforter; and on the side of the oppressor there was power. (Ecclesiastes 4:1)

== Family ==
The Days were one of the most prominent families in West Springfield, holding many positions in the local and state government. His father's cousin, Colonel Benjamin Day was called "the most prominent man on the west side of the river."

In addition to a successful military career, Benjamin served many terms as a representative to the General Court of Massachusetts, and was the first moderator and one of the original selectmen of West Springfield. Benjamin also raised ninety pounds for the purchase of arms to be used in the Revolutionary War. Another of his father's cousins, William Day, was a sea captain and a hero of the French and Indian War for capturing a French admiral, and was the subject of a painting by John Singleton Copley. William was a member of the committee that approved the Sheffield Declaration. This William Day is a potential candidate to be the Captain William Day who earned Revolutionary War fame as the first American sea captain to be recognized by a foreign government (France).

Luke's cousin, Josiah, owned a home, which still stands today as the oldest known brick saltbox-style house in the country, and serves as a family museum. Luke is known to have trained his men in the commons area in front of this house, and it may have even served as his headquarters. Luke's brother-in-law (and first cousin) was Justin Morgan, who developed the Morgan horse breed and composed music, which survives today. Luke's brother, Thomas, also served in the Revolution as a lieutenant.

== Revolutionary War ==
Day, then a second lieutenant in Captain Enoch Chapin's company of minutemen, marched on Boston on April 20, 1775, in response to the Lexington Alarm of the previous day. He served in Danielson's Regiment for the remainder of 1775 during the Siege of Boston.

On January 1, 1777 he was commissioned a captain in the 7th Massachusetts Regiment and served until his discharge on June 20, 1783.

He was an original member of the Massachusetts Society of the Cincinnati.

== Shays' Rebellion ==
According to John Lockwood:

It was more the result of accident than any other cause that Shays had the precedence, and the fortune to make his name infamous by association with the rebellion in which he was engaged. Day was the stronger man, in mind and will, the equal of Shays in military skill, and his superior in the gift of speech.

== Later years ==
The Society of the Cincinnati, which he had joined to solidify his legacy, dismissed him as a member on July 13, 1787, due to his involvement in Shays' Rebellion. When Luke Sr. died in 1791, Luke Jr. was not named in his will. It is not known whether this was due to his participation in the rebellion, or other factors. He was brought to court several times for unpaid mortgage debts. Luke was known to have suffered from gout in his later years, and lived out his life in relative poverty and obscurity.

== Death ==
On June 1, 1801, shortly before his 58th birthday, Luke died at his home in West Springfield. Due to his infamy at the time as a leader of Shays' Rebellion, he was buried next to his mother in an unmarked grave at Paucatuck Cemetery to prevent desecration, and only received a headstone almost two centuries later, in 1987, from the Ramapogue Historical Society.
