= William Conkey =

William Conkey (17 September 1717 – 1788) was an innkeeper of Pelham, Massachusetts in the 18th century.

== Early life ==
William was born William McConkey in Worcester, Massachusetts to Alexander and Margaret McConkey. William moved to Pelham about 1740, settling in the eastern section of town (that later became part of the town of Prescott, one of four towns lost to make way for the giant Quabbin Reservoir). About 1743, he dropped the "Mc" from his name, appearing in records from that time as "Conkey", as did all others of that surname in the area. That same year, he was elected hogreeve, followed by public service as surveyor of highways, fence viewer, and selectman.

== Founding of Conkey's Tavern ==
William founded Conkey's Tavern in 1758 in a frontier village amidst the French and Indian War. He built the first tavern in Pelham in a remote location, one-half-mile (1 km) from any other building. Town records show licenses to be an Innholder, Retailer, and common Victual being issued beginning on 25 August 1772, putting a legal stamp on on-going activities. In 1769, tavern records show him paying £1 for 1,000 nails, and in 1776 the town paid him £1 for conveying provisions to Revolutionary soldiers in Watertown, some 80 miles (128 km) away. With his death in 1788, the tavern continued under his son William's management. William Jr. continued the jack-of-all-trades tradition as innkeeper, shoemaker, butcher, lumberman, and school committee member.

Conkey's Tavern, located in a valley of Pelham, Massachusetts, had a vital role, not only in Massachusetts history, but also in the history of the whole country. It is famous as the home base of Shays' Rebellion, a post-Colonial uprising that greatly affected the final form of the US Constitution and the decision to authorize a strong central government. The rebellion-related discussions that happened within the tavern setting give some insight as to whether colonial taverns were typically places to momentarily escape life's cares or instead were places of informed, sophisticated debate, or both. Say "tavern" and "popular revolt" and the easily summoned image is an inebriated, overwrought rabble. A little study reveals that image to be false.

"…the selectmen were Pelham’s chief administrative officers, with a host of responsibilities…They had been given these responsibilities earlier than spring by the annual town meeting. In fact, however, they had been selected well before the annual meeting. Men met usually every year, at conkey's Tavern and other Pelham watering holes, and discussed who was the best one to run the town . Here most of the politicking took place, and here was where basic decisions were usually made. The annual town meeting, in most instances, just ratified the results…. Virtually every town in western Massachusetts had a similar setup."

William Conkey's customers were, more often than not, his Scotch-Irish neighbors from the hardscrabble hills and hollows of Pelham. Most of these families emigrated from the English-imposed hardships of Ireland in 1718, settling in the frontier town of Worcester. The English Puritans and Congregationalists of Worcester, over the next two decades, burned the Presbyterian church, rioted, and otherwise made life uncomfortable, so that dozens of Scotch-Irish families after 1738 moved en masse to their own new community some 45 miles (72 km) farther west. The rock-strewn hills were good for lumbering and grazing, but not much else. Townsfolk did not include any idle rich or privileged gentry.

Scotch-Irish families often functioned, willingly or not, as isolated picket lines when Native American war parties were on the move, as depicted in Last of the Mohicans. Certainly, Pelham residents were on the ramparts 160 miles (256 km) to the northwest at the siege of Fort William Henry and in other campaigns, just as they would later march 80 miles (128 km) to Concord, Lexington, and Bunker Hill whenever an alarm was sounded. So when Landlord Conkey served up the rum, brandy, and wine from his cellar, those raising a tankard were often hard and wary veterans.

While popular accounts of Shays' Rebellion emphasize impoverished, debt-ridden farmers desperately trying to stave off foreclosures, the issues that animated the discussions and informed the petitions crafted within the tavern were much more sophisticated. Many issues led to Shays' Rebellion, but two stand out as tavern fare. With the Revolutionary War won, states began the process of writing and ratifying their own constitutions. The wealthy eastern interests in the Commonwealth of Massachusetts maneuvered adroitly to concentrate political power in their own hands while spreading the burden of taxation as regressively as they could among the common folk. The subsistence farmers of western counties comprehended, organized, and petitioned to champion concepts like "no taxation without representation" to throw off "destructive and tyrannical government". States had paid for Revolutionary War soldiers with paper notes, which veterans soon learned were worth maybe a tenth of their face value. Speculators bought the notes for pennies from de-mobilized soldiers who had to buy nails and seed in the tough economic times following the war. The speculators then convinced their friends in new state governments, controlled by like-minded merchants and bankers, to redeem the full face value of the notes. How? By taking out government debt to be repaid, of course, by higher poll and property taxes on the same average farmers and artisans of the hill towns who sold the worthless paper to the speculators in the first place. "Not only was the tax bite going to be heavy, then, it was biased against farm families with grown sons, and the chief beneficiaries were to be Boston speculators." The speculators ultimately succeeded beyond their wildest dreams, but not without the patrons of Conkey's Tavern understanding exactly what was going on and organizing to protest these get-rich-at-our-expense schemes. Had the patrons not proclaimed themselves "regulators" in pursuit of a more representative and equitable government and taken up arms to force the issue, the Constitutional Convention and George Washington in particular would not have been swayed by the speculators' public relations scare tactics. The draft constitution would not have been quickly re-written to bring in strong central government and a standing army. A loosely federated United States, half slave owning and half not, would have had a very different history.

The tavern went out of business when William Conkey, Jr. died in 1841, and the abandoned building eventually was destroyed in the 1880s. The American Museum in Bath, England bought up everything having to do with Conkey's Tavern. The museum faithfully and superbly recreated the interior main room, using the original massive stone fireplace lintel, with the neatly chiseled inscription "William Conkey June Ye 21st AD 1776". Scores of tourists tramp through the simulated tavern daily, sampling gingerbread and pausing for warmth at the well-maintained fire.

== Personal life ==
Conkey married first Mary Young (b. 1720, Worcester, Massachusetts, d. 9 September 1754) about 1740, about the time that William and Mary moved from Worcester to the new town of Pelham. William married secondly Rebekah Hamilton (b. 1727, Worcester, d. 3 July 1811, Pelham) daughter of Thomas and Margary Hamilton, on 17 November 1755.

Conkey died in 1788 in East Pelham, Massachusetts.
