= Conkey =

Conkey is a surname. Notable people with the surname include:

- John Conkey, the owner of the Boston Red Stockings of the National League in 1872
- Margaret Conkey (born 1943), archaeologist
- Theodore Conkey (1819–1880), American surveyor, businessman and Democratic politician
- William Conkey (1717–1788), innkeeper of Pelham, Massachusetts in the 18th century

== See also ==
- Conkey House, an 1842 historic home in Niagara County, New York
