= Anna Bingham =

Anna Dix Bingham (3 August 1745 – 1829) was an American businesswoman and innkeeper.

Born Anna Dix in Watertown, Massachusetts, she was well educated compared to most women of the time. She had a baby out of wedlock and was convicted of fornication in September 1765. Two months later she married Thomas Orton Jr. In 1773 she remarried to Silas Bingham and in 1775 they opened a store in Stockbridge, Massachusetts, later expanding the business to include a tavern and inn. Silas died in 1781 and Anna became the first woman in the history of Berkshire County to hold a liquor license.

In 1787, Bingham's Tavern was the headquarters of the Shays' Rebellion. "Following Shay's Rebellion, Anna Bingham persevered in running her tavern and, in addition, began to diversify her business and community interests...Anna's wide range of interests naturally brought her into conflict with equally ambitious men". She, Ebenezer Kingsley, and Silas Pepoon were sued by entrepreneur Thomas Jenkins over a financial dispute. The suit was successful and upheld in two appeals to the Supreme Court in the 1790s: Kingsley v. Jenkins and Pepoon v. Jenkins. This made Bingham the first female litigant to come before the Supreme Court.
