= Eli Parsons =

American military officer (1748–1830)

- Born: January 29, 1748; Springfield, Massachusetts, U.S.
- Died: September 26, 1830 (aged 82); Oswego, New York, U.S.
- Burial place: Riverside cemetery, Oswego, New York, U.S.
- Military career
- Allegiance: United Colonies; United States
- Rank: Lieutenant
- Conflicts: American Revolutionary War: Battle of Germantown (WIA); Shays' Rebellion

Eli Parsons (January 29, 1748, Springfield – 26 or 30 September 1830, Oswego) was a leading contributor to Shays' Rebellion in the developing climate of revolutionary America.
