= Job Shattuck =

American Revolutionary War soldier and landowner

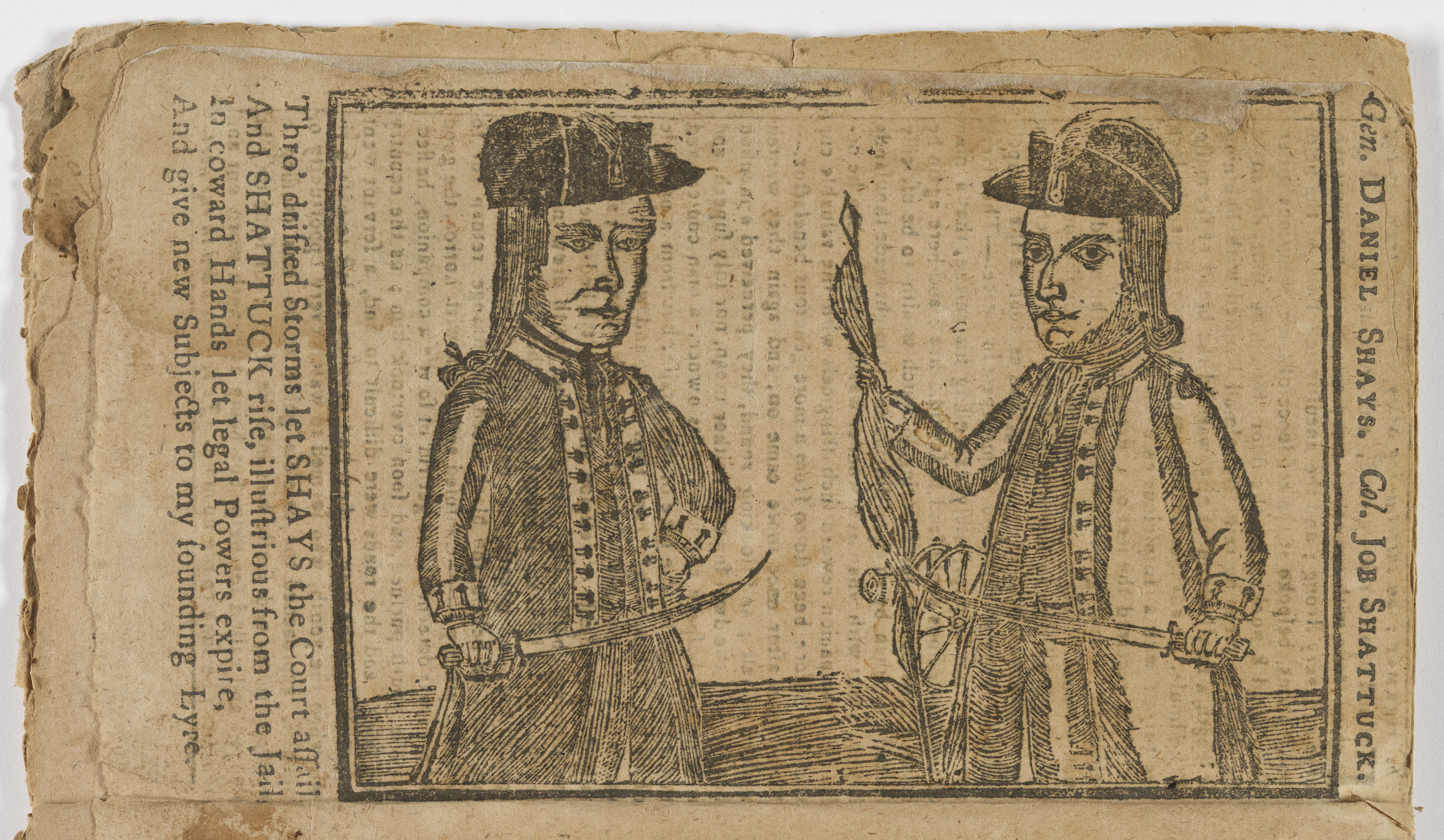
- Perhaps the most famous image of Shays' Rebellion: "Regulators" Daniel Shays (left) and Job Shattuck (right), two of the main protesters of the uprising, from a 1787 Boston Almanack woodcut, Artist unknown.
- Born: February 11, 1736; Groton, Massachusetts
- Died: January 13, 1819 (aged 82); Groton, Massachusetts
- Burial place: Old Burying Ground, Groton, Massachusetts
- Military career
- Allegiance: British America; United Colonies; United States
- Rank: Captain
- Conflicts: Seven Years' War; Battle of Fort Beauséjour; American Revolutionary War; Battle of Bunker Hill; Siege of Boston; Siege of Fort Ticonderoga; Shays' Rebellion (WIA)

Job Shattuck (February 11, 1736 – January 13, 1819) was an American military officer and landowner who served during the Seven Years' War and the American Revolutionary War. He first served with the Massachusetts Militia in the 1755 Battle of Fort Beauséjour. He was later active at the Siege of Boston in 1776 and then in preparing defenses at Mt. Independence and Ft. Ticonderoga later that year.

Following the end of the American Revolutionary War, Shattuck returned to Massachusetts where he was the largest landowner in Groton, Massachusetts. He was a key figure in the nation-defining 1786–87 farmers' revolt known as Shays' Rebellion, leading forces that shut down a state court in Concord. He was arrested in late 1786 on charges of treason, but was pardoned in 1787 by Governor John Hancock.

== Early life in Groton and military service ==
Shattuck was born in the rural central Massachusetts town of Groton in 1736, not long after the final Indian raids and skirmishes that had so often embattled the town during its early colonial period. His family occupied a large tract of land in the northwest corner of town, much of the acreage fronting the banks of the Nashua River. He would eventually become, through ultimogeniture, and his own purchases, the largest landowner in Groton with an estate of approximately 500 acres. At the age of 19, Shattuck joined the Massachusetts Militia as a private in Captain Ephraim Jones's company and took part in the expulsion of the Acadians from Nova Scotia in 1755.

In 1775, he responded to the Lexington Alarm, arriving too late to participate, continued on to Cambridge for several days and then returned to Groton where he served on a town committee to assist the Boston poor that had evacuated that city upon the British return. He was part of a company of men that went to Boston in the fall of 1775 for a six-week period to provide necessary backup as Washington put the Continental Army into place. He returned to Groton, but then went back to Boston to participate in the siege. That summer of 1776 he led Groton men to Mt. Independence and Ft. Ticonderoga as part of the northern defense, returning to Groton in December 1776. He was promoted to the rank of captain by the provincial congress in 1776 and was also elected town selectman of Groton on three occasions during the war.

== Groton Riots ==
In October 1781, while serving as town selectman, Shattuck was one of eighteen men obstructing the tax collecting efforts of two constables on three separate occasions, a series of events called the "Groton Riots." In April 1782, he pleaded guilty to rioting and paid a fine of ten pounds. Notwithstanding, townspeople continued to elect him to various positions in local government and as its representative in negotiating benefits on the behalf of soldiers.

== Shays' Rebellion ==
Crippled by debt in the aftermath of the revolution, the state of Massachusetts levied upon its towns and citizens tax burdens higher than had been in place during British rule. Those who suddenly found themselves in arrears to the state quickly discovered that their land, livelihood and possibly even their freedom were at stake. Many who could not assuage their debts faced the unpleasant prospect of serving time in a debtors' prison. The high tax burden, combined with the demand that it be paid in specie and the high-handed control of the government by merchant interests, transformed rural resentment into a full-blown agrarian revolt. The rebellion was waged primarily by debt-ridden western farmers and landowners who banded together and captured shire town courthouses in Massachusetts, closing them to all proceedings. Violence was threatened and enacted against many officials who would not stand down. On a national scale, the rebellion was viewed with intense interest by citizens and public officials of all of the confederated former colonies because it "tested the precarious institutions of the new republic." To officials in Boston, Job Shattuck became, perhaps even more than Daniel Shays, the leader of the agrarians in the western part of the state, a leading firebrand and empathetic advocate of the soldier–farmer who had risked life, limb, and land for the cause of the revolution only to return from the war to find injustice and foreclosure still looming.

=== Closure of the court at Concord and attempt at Cambridge ===
On a rainy September day in 1786, Shattuck led a mob of roughly 200 men and forcibly closed session at the Middlesex County Courthouse in Concord. A similar raid upon the courthouse in Cambridge was planned by the Shaysites for November; however, officials in Boston acted before this could occur by issuing a warrant for the immediate arrest of Shattuck and four other conspirators.

As described in Artful and Designing Men, by Gary Shattuck, court documents reveal that Job Shattuck had been threatened with death by protestors from neighboring Worcester County if he did not participate in the Cambridge takeover.

=== Arrest and reprisals ===
Charged with treason, on November 30, 1786, Shattuck was harried across the Groton countryside by over 100 men, of whom several were members of the Independent Corps of Cadets from Boston. After they violently searched his home and failed to find him (during which at least one member of his family was injured), they found him on the banks of the Nashua River and took him into custody. He nearly lost his right leg when a cadet slashed it with a sword just above the knee. Shattuck was transported from Groton to Concord and then to Boston and placed into a debtors' cell at the town jail. He was tried, convicted, and sentenced to death by hanging in May 1787, but was pardoned by Governor John Hancock the following September. Shattuck died on January 13, 1819.

== Bibliography ==
- Richards, Leonard L. Shays's Rebellion: The American Revolution's Final Battle. University of Pennsylvania Press, 2002.
- Shattuck, Gary, Artful and Designing Men: The Trials of Job Shattuck and the Regulation of 1786-1787. Tate Publishing, 2013.
- Szatmary, David, Shays' Rebellion: The Making of an Agrarian Insurrection. University of Massachusetts Press, 1980.
