= William Day (sea captain) =

William Day (October 23, 1715 in Springfield, Massachusetts – March 22, 1797 in Sheffield) was a Springfield, Massachusetts (United States), sea captain who acted against America's enemies in both the French and Indian War and the American Revolutionary War. In 1777 he received the first gun salute to an American fighting vessel in a European port.

== Life before 1776 ==
Little is known of the life of Revolutionary War sea captain William Day, beyond what was learned by those he captured in 1777. The birth and death dates assigned to him for this article are based on a claim he made then: that during the French and Indian War (the long American conflict which spread to Europe as the Seven Years' War) he served as a privateer on behalf of the British and their American colonists against French shipping. The family of William Day (1715–97) still possesses a portrait of him celebrating his triumph against a French convoy in that conflict, strongly implying that he is indeed the 1777 William Day.

In August 1756, Day was hired by George Campbell, a merchant of Liverpool, England, to command a 14-gun privateer brigantine named Brave Blakeney. Sailing into the Atlantic Ocean, he met with another British privateer, the Hawke of Exeter, and they agreed to co-operate. On 6 October, they sighted a small convoy of four French merchant ships off the Spanish coast near Cape Finisterre; these were the Robuste (14 guns), the Juste (22 guns, 10 of which turned out to be fakes), La Gloire (armament uncertain) and Victoire (10 guns). The French ships formed a battle line, but Blakeney got in among them and after a two-hour battle forced the surrender of the Juste. Meanwhile, Hawke's crew boarded and captured the Robuste. When these two ships were secured with prize crews, the British privateers chased the others. La Gloire threw guns and other equipment overboard to gain speed, but was caught by Blakeney; Victoire managed to elude Hawke long enough to escape in the night.

Following that success, in August 1757 William Day was hired to command another Liverpool-based privateer, the 20-gun Prussian Hero. He sailed to the West Indies, and in March 1758 he met with five French privateers off Martinique. They fired at him, but he managed to escape. Shortly afterwards, off the east end of Jamaica, he was attacked by a well-manned 16-gun French privateer, which managed to tangle its jib-boom with Prussian Hero's rigging, potentially allowing many men to board. The French superiority of numbers meant that, although the initial boarding was repulsed with heavy losses ("the deck ran with blood"), Day had to cut the ropes holding the two ships together and retreat, for the loss of only a single crew member.

At the start of the American Revolution he seems to have been a successful merchant captain, with a home in the historic port of Charlestown, Massachusetts. In June 1775, during the "Battle of Bunker Hill", much of Charlestown was destroyed, including Day's home, as (according to what he told his 1777 captives) he discovered when he returned from a voyage to the West Indies. Family narratives of William Day (1715–97), whose main home then was far inland at Sheffield, Massachusetts, make no mention of this.

== Return to action ==
After the British forces evacuated Boston in March 1776, the port became an important centre for activities against British shipping. The business house of Philip Moore & Co. financed a number of privateers, including Day. A 370-ton British merchant vessel, the Isaac of Liverpool, which had been captured on the way home from the West Indies by John Philips in the privateer sloop Warren, and taken to Salem, Massachusetts, was converted to a fighting frigate with twenty 9-pound guns and six 4-pounders, and rechristened the General Mifflin. On 1 November 1776, the Council of Massachusetts issued a State Navy commission to Day as commander (the document also notes that his Second Lieutenant was William Day Jr.). For its first cruise, the Mifflin had a crew of 120, five tons of shot and two tons of powder, plus eight tons of bread and flour, and 120 barrels of meat.

== The 1777 cruise ==
The cruise authorised on 1 November may have been confined to American waters, but on 21 May 1777 the Mifflin left Boston with a squadron of about 14 privateers, escorted by the Continental Navy frigates Hancock (John Manley, squadron commander) and Boston. For the first 25 days, the squadron worked together, sharing prize money equally. Two days before this period expired, Day captured a British cargo vessel bound from London to New York, laden with salt, sherry, dried fruit and bark- which, having safely arrived at an American-controlled port on 25 June, was also found to be carrying an interesting letter from a London merchant firm to business partners in New York, observing that "we have no doubt (supposing the present campaign to be as ineffectual as the last) that the colonies will remain independent," and pondering future business prospects. Some of the privateers, without the escort vessels, then continued along the main New York- London shipping lane to cruise in British waters. Nearing Ireland, they were separated by bad weather (probably shortly after 24 June, when Day captured the Rebecca and Polly, which had left Cork in a convoy bound for New York two days earlier). One vessel, the Tartar sailed to the waters north of Scotland and preyed with great success on the Baltic shipping route, but Captain Day chose a bolder plan.

Mifflin sailed clockwise round Ireland, capturing four more vessels along the north coast between 6 July and 8 July; one of these, a sloop without cargo, was sunk, and another, carrying salt, was given to the captured crews to get them home. Now the Mifflin was ready for the most dangerous part of the expedition, sailing through the narrow North Channel into the Irish Sea. What Day did not know was that just over a fortnight earlier, between 19 June and 23 June, a little squadron led by Continental Navy captain Lambert Wickes had done exactly the same. As a result, the valuable linen ships which would normally have been crossing between Ireland and England had adopted a convoy system, and were all waiting in port for their escorts. One small but useful prize was taken in the North Channel on 9 July- a sloop carrying wool, soap and skins. The next day, in the Irish Sea, Day found himself spoilt for choice; twice, as he was about to sink worthless vessels, potentially rich prizes were spotted, and Mifflin departed at once. This policy was rewarded by the capture of a ship carrying a very valuable cargo of deal timber from the Norway. Returning immediately to the last vessel intended for scuttling, Day then used it as another ferry for unwanted British crewmen. Finally, on 11 July, a smaller timber vessel was also taken, after which the Mifflin passed, without any interference from the Royal Navy, through St. George's Channel into the Atlantic once more.

Some of the captives had gone to ports in Cumberland, in the north-west of England, and the two newspapers published in Whitehaven printed as much information as they could get. Thus the British public learned that Day was in his sixties or seventies, somewhat lame from gout, and walked with two sticks; that he had taken some personal possessions (gold and silver watches) from one of the captains who tried to conceal them on the advice of another captive; and that, having approached, as was then usual, under English colours, when ready to attack he raised a white flag with a pine tree and the words "Appeal to Heaven" (a Massachusetts naval ensign). Express messages were sent to the Admiralty in London, and received the reply that a battleship and a sloop had been sent in pursuit of the privateer; also that a frigate was being stationed in the area for future protection. The newspapers also reported, a week after the initial drama, that the Mifflin had met with the Royal Navy sloop of war Wolfe in the Bristol Channel, and surrendered after a three-hour battle.

== A Great Day ==
The news of the capture was denied by a reliable source even as it was being written, and indeed it was not true. The Mifflin arrived in the French naval port of Brest a few days after leaving the Irish Sea, and fired a victory salute. Admiral du Chaffault, commander of the French naval forces based in the port, consulted for an hour and a half, then ordered the firing of an acknowledgement. Salutes are only returned from one sovereign state to another, so in effect, he was acknowledging, on behalf of France, the validity of the Declaration of Independence. In theory, rebel colonial fighting vessels should not even have been allowed into French ports except for humanitarian reasons, let alone acknowledged by gun salutes, and when news of this event was conveyed by British representatives in the port to their Ambassador, Lord Stormont, he threatened to break off diplomatic relations between Britain and France. The French, although they had first offered aid to America back in 1775, and had been supplying both matériel and military advisors since 1776, were not yet ready to form an open alliance, so the official line was that the Mifflin had put in at Brest for repairs, that the salute was a misunderstanding, and that France had vessels on patrol to keep privateers away- any then in port were ordered to leave. The first "official" salute of an American naval vessel thus ensued seven months later with the arrival of the USS Ranger in France, 14 February 1778.

Day finished his "repairs" about the end of July, but his next destination (according to Lambert Wickes, who was also doing "repair" work at St. Malo) was to be another French port, L'Orient. He was allowed in, and at the beginning of September he was still there (or at least, in the neighbouring harbour of Port Louis) when a French acquaintance offered to deliver a report of his cruise to Benjamin Franklin at Versailles, which the Captain happily provided. He left about the middle of the month, and was back in Boston by 29 November, but when the General Mifflin set out from America on another cruise in March 1778 (by which time France had signed treaties of alliance with America), the captain was Daniel McNeill. So there, until further information can be found, William Day's story ends.

== Principal source ==
Bradbury, David "Captain John Paul who? America vs. my town, 1774-78" Whitehaven UK, PastPresented (2007)
