= Daniel Shays =

American soldier and rebel (1747–1825)

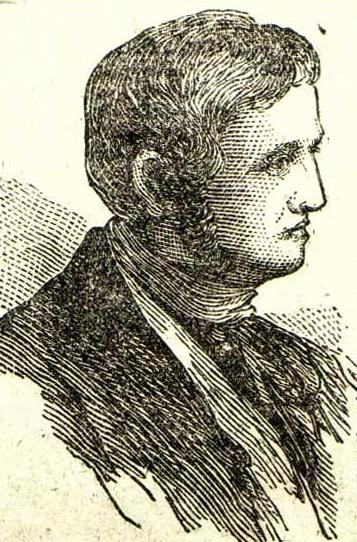
- A sketch of Shays in 1878's Our First Century by Richard Miller Devens
- Born: August 1747; Hopkinton, Province of Massachusetts Bay, British America
- Died: September 29, 1825 (aged 78); Sparta, New York, U.S.
- Resting place: Union Cemetery, Scottsburg, New York
- Occupations: Farmer; military officer
- Known for: American Revolutionary War captain; Shays' Rebellion
- Spouse: Abigail Gilbert (m. 1772)
- Children: 6
- Military career
- Allegiance: United States
- Branch: Massachusetts militia; Continental Army
- Service years: 1775 (militia); 1775–1780 (army)
- Rank: Captain
- Units: Woodbridge's Regiment (militia); Varnum's Regiment; 5th Massachusetts Regiment; Corps of Light Infantry
- Conflicts: American Revolutionary War; Boston campaign; Siege of Boston; Battles of Saratoga; Battle of Stony Point; Shays' Rebellion

Daniel Ogden Shays (August 1747 – September 29, 1825) was an American soldier, and farmer famous for allegedly leading Shays' Rebellion, a populist uprising against controversial debt collection and tax policies that took place in Massachusetts between 1786 and 1787. The actual role played by Shays in the rebellion is disputed by scholars.

== Early life ==
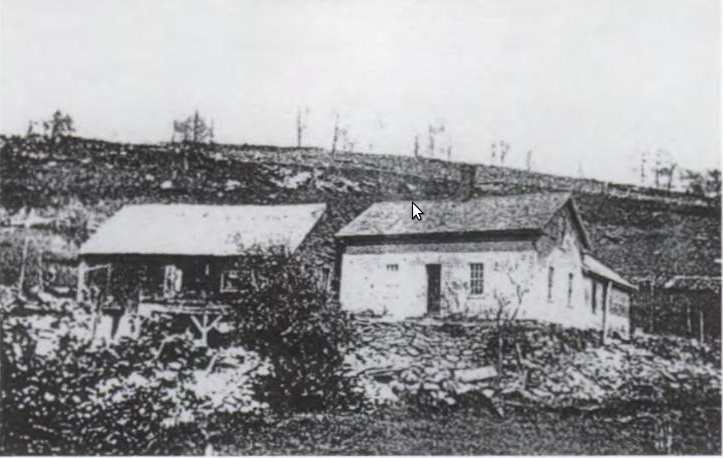
Daniel and Abigail Shays' Pelham, MA farmhouse, c. 1898

Daniel Ogden Shays was born in Hopkinton, Massachusetts, sometime between April and August 1747 to Irish immigrants Patrick Shays and Margaret Dempsey. Daniel was the second of seven siblings; his siblings were Margaret, James, Roger, Phebe, Mary, and Polly. He spent his early years as a landless farm laborer. In 1772, he married Abigail Gilbert, and they settled in Shutesbury, Massachusetts, where he owned a sixty-eight acre farm and they had six children.

== Revolutionary War ==
Shays joined the militia immediately prior to the American Revolution and attained the rank of sergeant in the regiment commanded by Benjamin Ruggles Woodbridge. The Battles of Lexington and Concord took place on April 19, 1775, and the next day Shays's unit was mobilized and marched to Boston. His company took part in the Boston campaign and Siege of Boston, and Shays fought at the Battle of Bunker Hill. Shortly after Bunker Hill, Shays was commissioned as a second lieutenant in recognition of the bravery and skill he demonstrated during the fighting. In late 1776, Shays joined Varnum's Regiment of the Continental Army, with which he served during fighting in New York and New Jersey. After performing temporary recruiting duty in Massachusetts during late 1776, on January 1, 1777, Shays was promoted to captain as commander of a company in the 5th Massachusetts Regiment. During 1777, Shays took part in several engagements in upstate New York, including the Battles of Saratoga.

After Saratoga, Shays continued to serve with the Continental Army in upstate New York. As commander of a company in the Corps of Light Infantry, which was commanded by Anthony Wayne, Shays took part in the July 1779 Battle of Stony Point. He subsequently served as commander of a company under the Marquis de Lafayette, which patrolled farmland on the New Jersey side of the Hudson River to prevent British troops from foraging. In 1780, Lafayette presented several officers, including Shays, with ornamental swords in honor of their military service. Shays sold his for cash to help pay off debts; he argued that there was nothing wrong with his action, because he already owned a sword, but his decision to sell his was frowned upon by his peers. After British officer John André was captured while collaborating with Continental officer Benedict Arnold's plot to surrender West Point to the British, Shays was assigned as one of the captains of the guard who oversaw André's imprisonment, a task for which Continental Army commander-in-chief George Washington personally selected him. Shays was present when André was executed on October 2, 1780, and was probably the officer who escorted him to the gallows. Shays resigned soon afterwards, and was discharged from the army on October 14, 1780.

== Shays' Rebellion ==
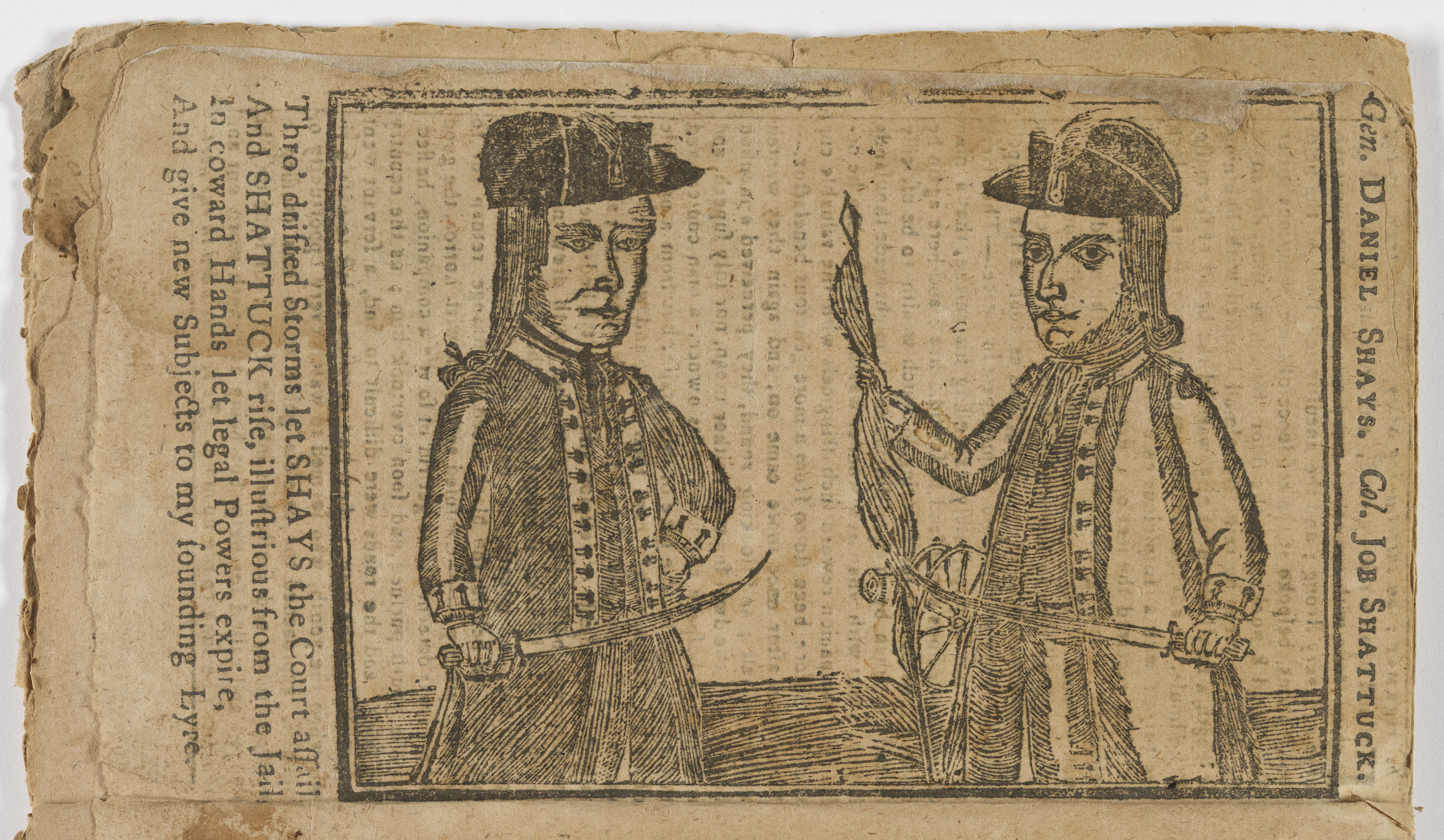
Contemporary engraving depicting Daniel Shays (left) and Job Shattuck, another rebel leader; the artist intentionally rendered them in an unflattering way

=== Debt and tax burdens ===
Upon returning home, Shays was summoned to court for unpaid debts, which he could not pay because he had not been paid in full for his military service. Shays was alarmed to discover that many of his fellow veterans and farmers were in the same financial situation. At commoners' meetings veterans asserted that they were treated unfairly upon release, and that businessmen were trying to squeeze money out of smallholders in order to pay their own debts to European war investors. Many Massachusetts rural communities first tried to petition the legislature in Boston, but the legislature did not respond substantively to those petitions.

The petitions and proposals often included a request to issue paper currency. Such inflationary issues would depreciate the currency, making it possible to meet obligations made at high values with lower-valued paper. Merchants, among them James Bowdoin, were opposed to these proposals because they were generally lenders who stood to lose. The proposals were repeatedly rejected. Governor John Hancock, accused by some of anticipating trouble, abruptly resigned in early 1785. When Bowdoin (a loser to Hancock in earlier elections) was elected governor that year, matters became more severe. Bowdoin stepped up civil actions to collect back taxes, and the legislature exacerbated the situation by levying an additional property tax to raise funds for the state's portion of foreign debt payments. Even comparatively conservative commentators like John Adams observed that these levies were "heavier than the People could bear".

=== Protests against the courts ===
Protests in rural Massachusetts turned into direct action in August 1786 after the state legislature adjourned without considering the many petitions that had been sent to Boston. On August 29, a well-organized force of protestors, Shays among them, marched on Northampton and successfully prevented the county court from sitting. The leaders of this and later forces proclaimed that they were seeking relief from the burdensome judicial processes that were depriving the people of their land and possessions. They called themselves Regulators, a reference to the Regulator movement of North Carolina that sought to reform corrupt practices in the late 1760s. On September 2, Governor Bowdoin issued a proclamation denouncing such mob action, but took no military measures in response beyond planning militia response to future actions.

When the court in Worcester was shut down by similar action on September 5, the county militia (composed mainly of men sympathetic to the protestors) refused to turn out, much to Bowdoin's amazement.

Shays, who had participated in the Northampton action, became involved in the uprising in November; though the precise role that Shays played is unclear and, as scholars have suggested, appears to have been exaggerated by contemporary elites. Historian Leonard Richards observes that "much of the backlash [against Shays and the protestors] was due to the Boston elite. Had they treated Daniel Shays as simply a small-town rebel leader, the aftermath might have been different. But they portrayed him instead as a major villain." On September 19, the Supreme Judicial Court of Massachusetts indicted eleven leaders of the rebellion as "disorderly, riotous, and seditious persons". When the supreme judicial court was next scheduled to meet in Springfield on September 26, Shays in Hampshire County and Luke Day in what is now Hampden County (but was then part of Hampshire County) organized an attempt to shut it down. They were anticipated by William Shepard, the local militia commander, who began gathering government-supporting militia the Saturday before the court was to sit. By the time the court was ready to open, Shepard had 300 men protecting the Springfield courthouse. Shays and Day were able to recruit a similar number, but chose only to demonstrate, exercising their troops outside Shepard's lines, rather than attempt to seize the building. The judges first postponed the hearings, and then adjourned on the 28th without hearing any cases. Shepard withdrew his force, which had grown to around 800 men (to the Regulators' 1,200), to the federal armory, which was then only rumored to be the target of seizure by the activists.

=== Plan to seize the Springfield Arsenal ===
On November 28, a posse of around 300 men rode to Groton to arrest Job Shattuck and other protest leaders in the area. Shattuck was chased-down and arrested on the 30th, and was wounded by a sword slash in the process. This action and the arrest of other protest leaders in the eastern parts of the state radicalized those in the west, and they began to organize an overthrow of the state government. "The seeds of war are now sown", wrote one correspondent in Shrewsbury, and by mid-January rebel leaders spoke of smashing the "tyrannical government of Massachusetts."

While government forces organized in the east, Shays, Day, and other rebel leaders in the west organized their forces, establishing regional regimental organizations that were run by democratically elected committees. Their first major target was the federal armory in Springfield. General Shepard had, however, pursuant to orders from Governor Bowdoin, taken possession of the armory and used its arsenal to arm a force of around 1,200 militia.

=== Attack and collapse ===
The insurgents were organized into three major groups, and intended to surround and simultaneously attack the armory. Shays led one group east of Springfield near Palmer, Luke Day had a second force across the Connecticut River in West Springfield, and the third force, under Eli Parsons, was to the north at Chicopee. The rebels had planned their assault for January 25, but Luke Day changed this at the last minute, sending Shays a message indicating he would not be ready to attack until the 26th. Day's message was intercepted by Shepard's men, so the militia of Shays and Parsons, around 1,500 men, approached the armory on the 25th not knowing they would have no support from the west.

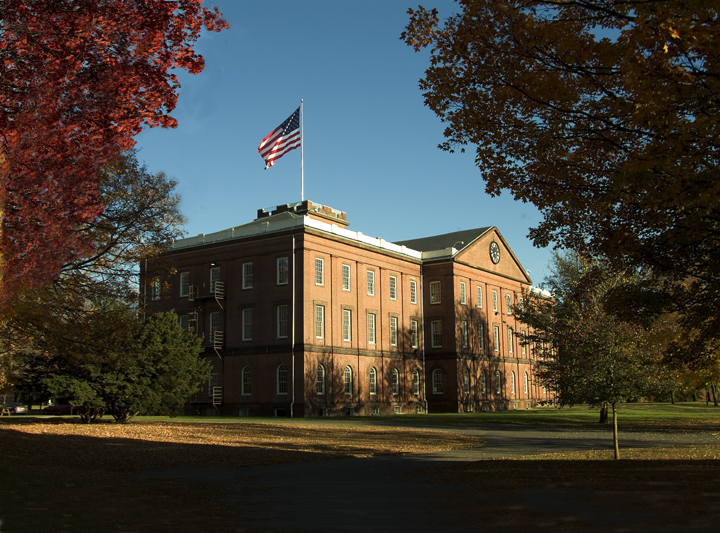
The Springfield Armory (building pictured is from the 19th century) was the first major target of the rebellion.

When Shays and his forces neared the armory, they found Shepard's militia waiting for them. Shepard first ordered warning shots fired over the approaching Shaysites' heads, and then ordered two cannons to fire grapeshot at Shays' men. Four Shaysites were killed and twenty wounded. There was no musket fire from either side, and the rebel advance collapsed. Most of the rebel force fled north, eventually regrouping at Amherst. On the opposite side of the river, Day's forces also fled north, also eventually reaching Amherst.

General Benjamin Lincoln had mustered 3,000 men at Worcester to deal with the rebels. When he heard of the Springfield incident, they immediately began marching west. Shays led the rebel force generally north and east to avoid Lincoln, eventually establishing a camp at Petersham. Along the way they raided the shops of local merchants for supplies, taking some of them hostage. Lincoln pursued them, reaching Pelham, around 10 miles (16 km) from Petersham, on February 2. On the night of February 3–4, he led his militia on a forced march to Petersham through a bitter snowstorm. Arriving early in the morning, they surprised the rebel camp so thoroughly that they scattered "without time to call in their out parties or even their guards." Although Lincoln claimed to capture 150 men, none of them were officers, leading historian Leonard Richards to suspect the veracity of the report. Shays and some of the other leaders escaped north into New Hampshire and Vermont.

Around four thousand people signed confessions acknowledging participation in the events of the rebellion (in exchange for amnesty); several hundred participants were eventually indicted on charges relating to the rebellion. Most of these were pardoned under a general amnesty that only excluded a few ringleaders. Eighteen men, including Shays, were convicted and sentenced to death. Most of these either had their convictions overturned on appeal, were pardoned, or had their sentences commuted. Two of the condemned men, John Bly and Charles Rose, were hanged on December 6, 1787. Shays was pardoned in 1788 and he returned to Massachusetts from hiding in the Vermont woods. He was, however, vilified by the Boston press, who painted him as an archetypal radical opposed to the government.

== Later life ==
Shays was later granted a pension by the federal government for the five years he served in the Continental Army without pay. Shays lived the last few years of his life in poverty, a heavy drinker. He supported himself on his pension and by working a small parcel of land. Shays died at age 78 in Sparta, New York and was later buried at the Union Cemetery in Scottsburg.

== Rededicated grave marker ==
The original gravestone for Shays contained an error; by dropping the "s", Shays was incorrectly spelled as "Shay". Philip R. Shays, of Clarence Center, New York, a descendant of Daniel Shays, led an effort to correct the error. Because the original stone did not contain enough space to add a letter, a new marker was created. The new gravestone was dedicated in a ceremony on August 12, 2016.

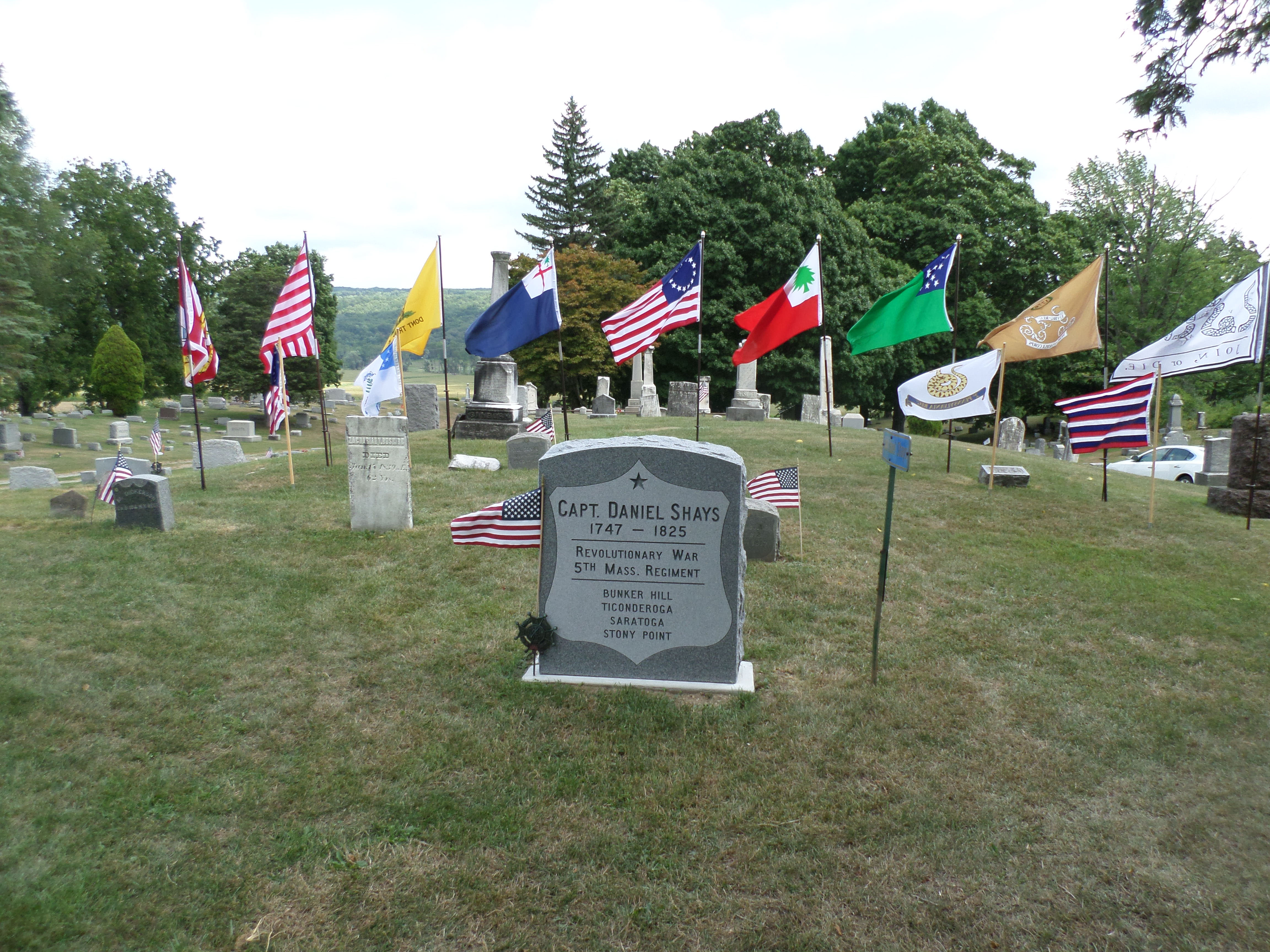
Dedication ceremony for new Daniel Shays gravestone

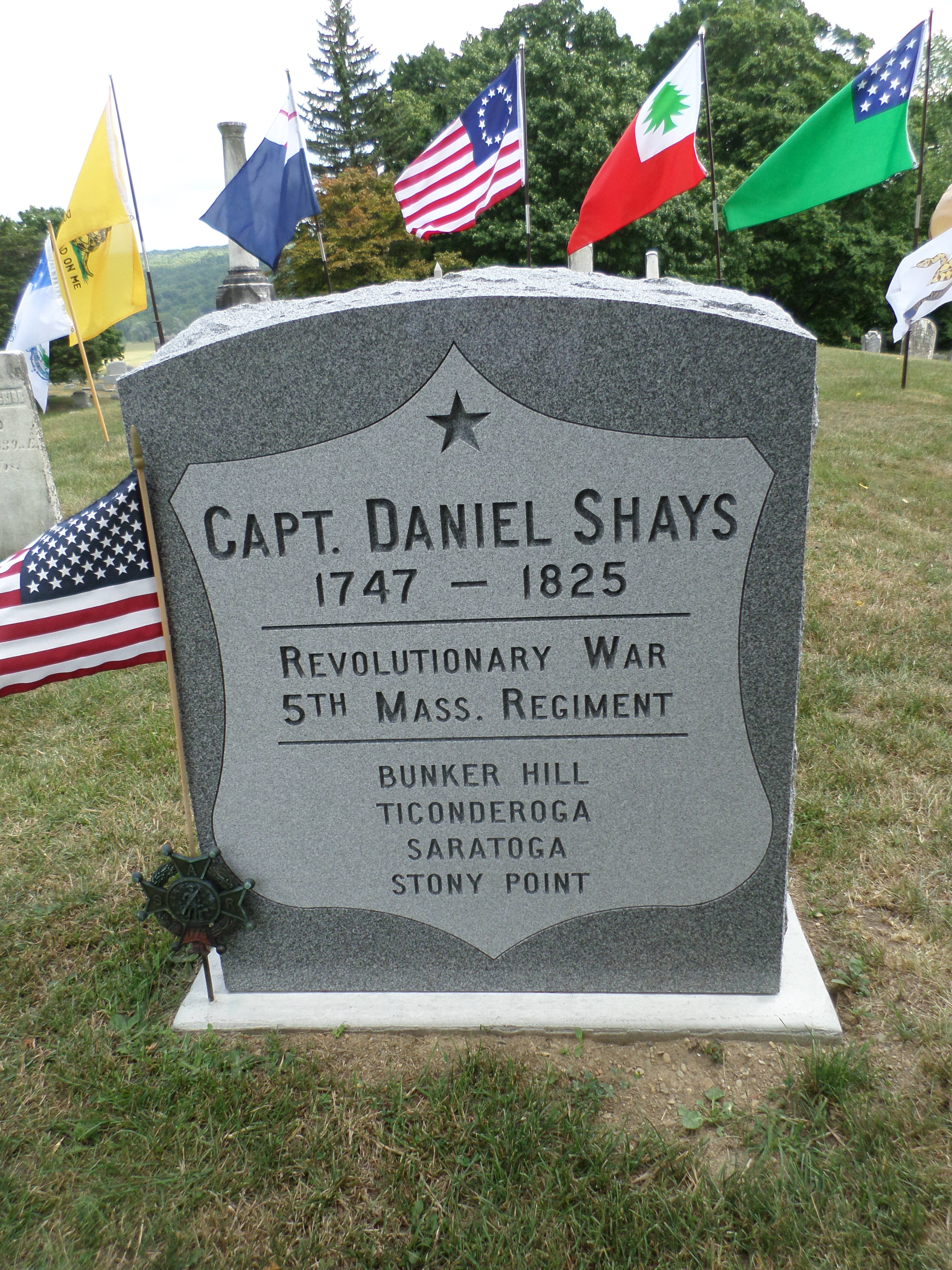
Front side of rededicated gravestone for Daniel Shays

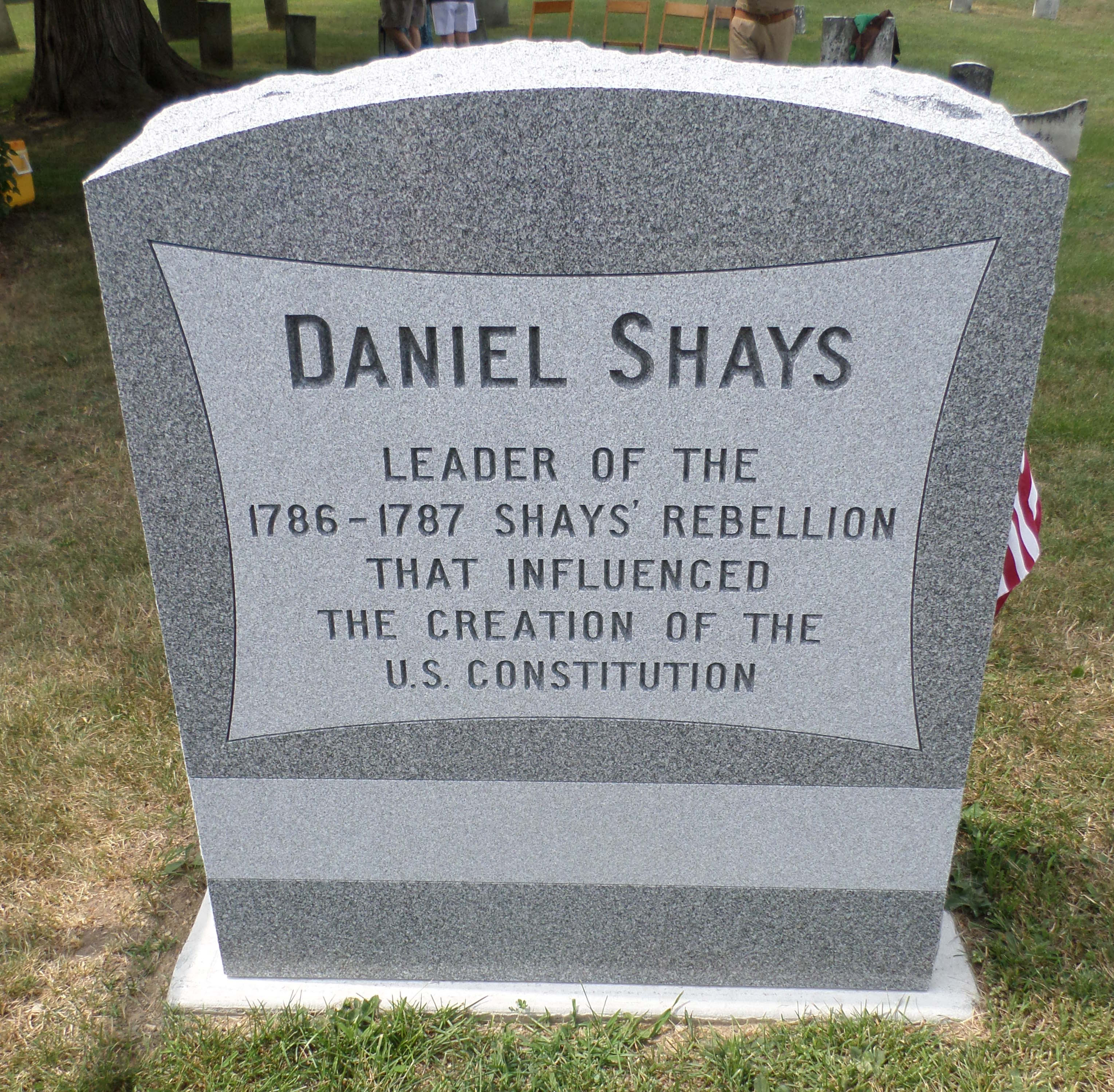
Reverse side of new gravestone for Daniel Shays

== Sources ==
- Holland, Josiah Gilbert (1855). History of Western Massachusetts. Springfield, MA: S. Bowles. p. 245. OCLC 505288328.
- Morse, Anson (1909). The Federalist Party in Massachusetts to the Year 1800. Princeton, NJ: Princeton University Press. OCLC 718724.
- Richards, Leonard L (2002). Shays's Rebellion: The American Revolution's Final Battle. Philadelphia: University of Pennsylvania Press. ISBN 978-0-8122-1870-1. OCLC 56029217.
- Szatmary, David P. (1980). Shays's Rebellion: The Making of an Agrarian Insurrection. University of Massachusetts Press. ISBN 978-0-87023-419-4.
- Zinn, Howard (2005). A People's History of the United States. New York: HarperCollins. ISBN 978-0-06-083865-2. OCLC 61265580.
