= Shays's Rebellion =

Armed uprising in western Massachusetts (1786–1787)

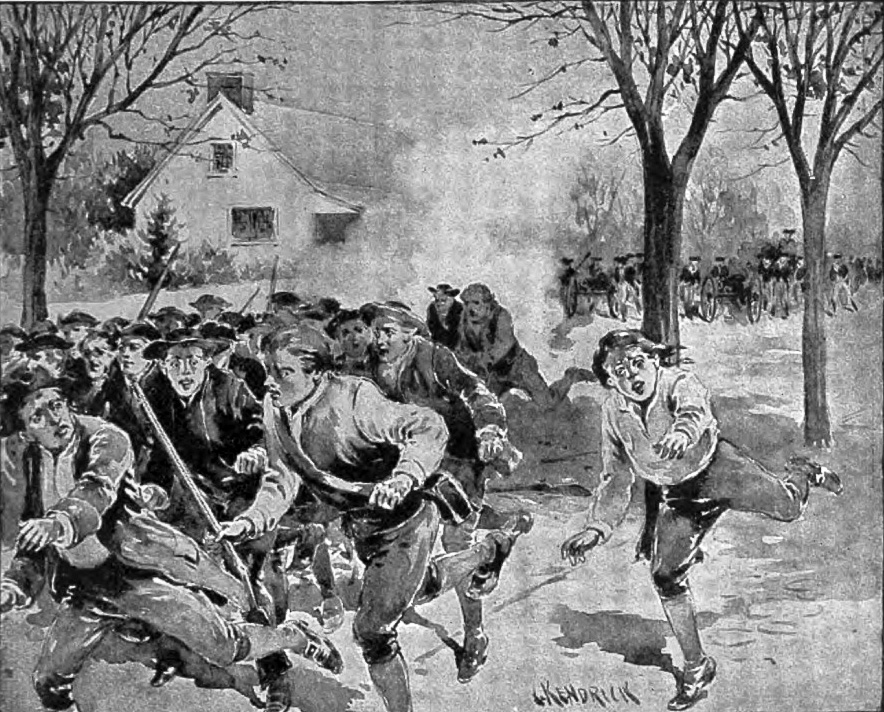
- An illustration of Shays's troops repulsed from the armory in Springfield in early 1787
- Date: August 29, 1786 – February 1787
- Location: Western Massachusetts, United States
- Caused by: Economic conflict between farmers and merchants; Aggressive tax and debt collection; Political corruption and cronyism
- Goals: Reform, later overthrow, of state government
- Methods: Direct action to close courthouse; Attempted seizure of federal arsenal at Springfield Armory
- Result: Rebellion crushed; Weak federal reaction helps spur Constitutional Convention

Parties
Continental Congress: Massachusetts State Militia; Private militia	Regulators

Lead figures
James Bowdoin; William Shepard; Benjamin Lincoln	Daniel Shays; Luke Day; Eli Parsons; Job Shattuck

Number
4,000+ (largest force 3,000)	4,000+ (largest force 1,500)

Casualties and losses
3 killed; Dozens wounded	6 killed; Dozens wounded; Many arrested; 2 executed

Shays's Rebellion was an armed uprising in Western Massachusetts and Worcester in response to a debt crisis among the citizenry and in opposition to the state government's increased efforts to collect taxes on both individuals and their trades. The fighting took place in the areas around Springfield during 1786 and 1787. Historically, scholars have argued that the four thousand rebels, called Shaysites, who protested against economic and civil rights injustices by the Massachusetts government were led by Revolutionary War veteran Daniel Shays. By the early 2020s, scholarship has suggested that Shays's role in the protests was significantly exaggerated.

In 1787, the protesters marched on the federal Springfield Armory in an unsuccessful attempt to seize its weaponry and overthrow the government. The federal government, severely limited in its prerogatives under the Articles of Confederation, found itself unable to finance troops to put down the rebellion; it was consequently put down by the Massachusetts State Militia under William Shepard, alongside a privately funded local militia led by former Continental Army officer Benjamin Lincoln. The widely-held view had already developed that the Articles of Confederation were untenable and needed amending, with the events of the rebellion serving as further evidence for the later Constitutional Convention. There is continuing debate among scholars as to what extent the rebellion influenced the later drafting and ratification of the Constitution.

== Background ==
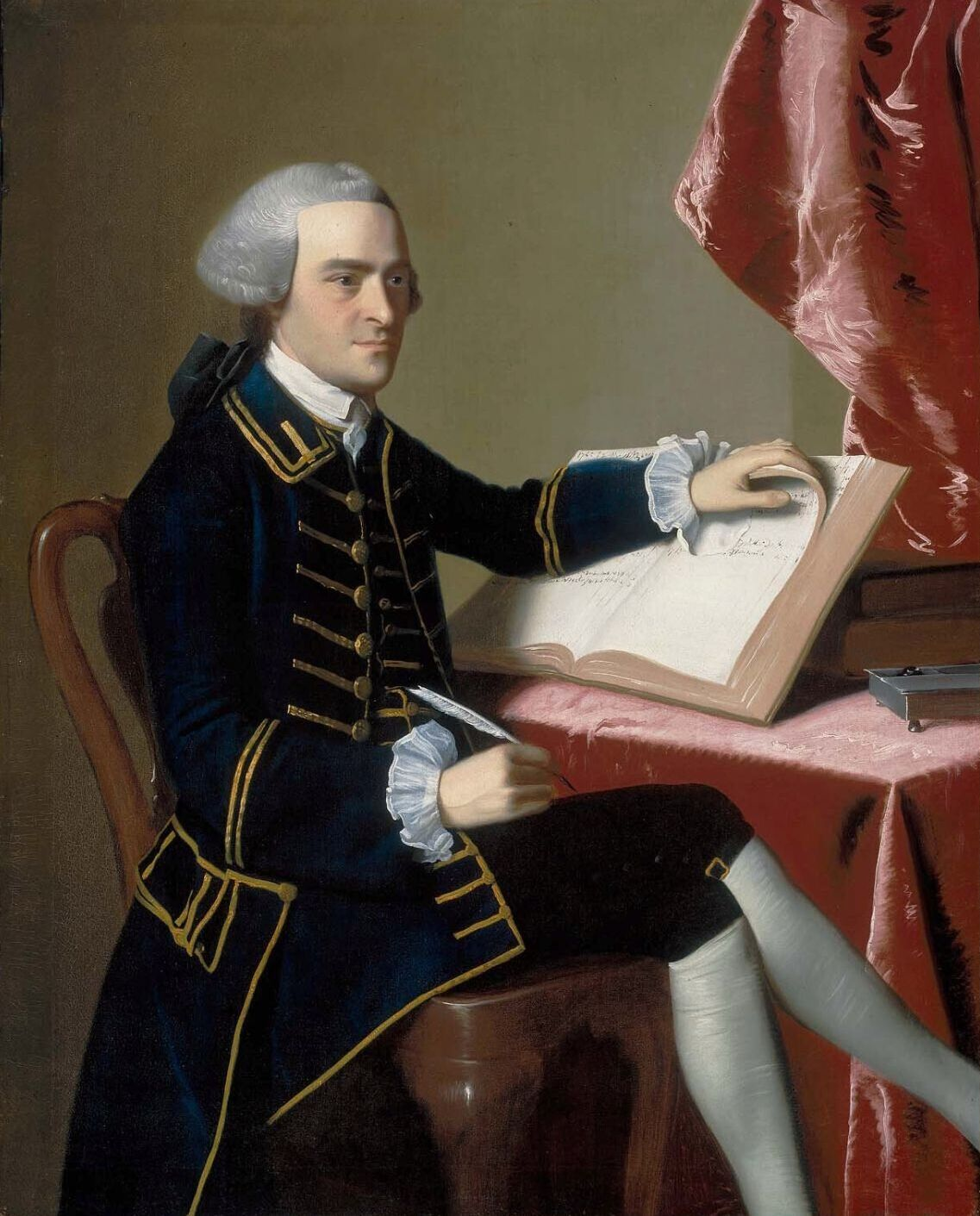
Populist Governor John Hancock refused to crack down on tax delinquencies and accepted devalued paper currency for debts.

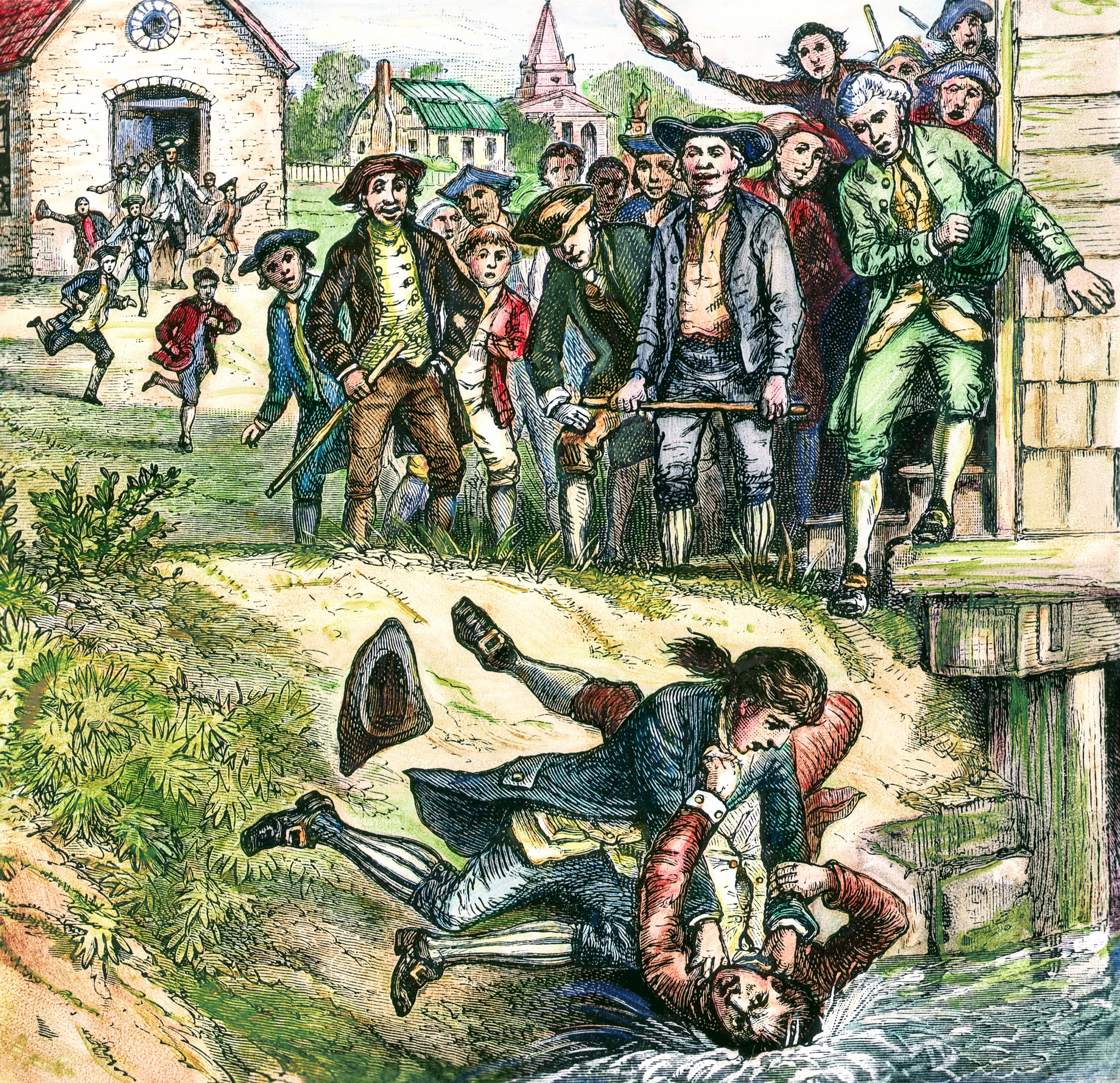
Artist's depiction of protesters watching a debtor in a scuffle with a tax collector by the courthouse at Springfield, Massachusetts. The insurrection was a tax-related rebellion.

Prior to the 19th century, the economy of rural New England largely consisted of subsistence agriculture, particularly in the hill towns of central and western Massachusetts. Some residents in these areas had few assets beyond their land, and they bartered with one another for goods and services. In lean times, farmers might obtain goods on credit from suppliers in local market towns who would be paid when times were better. In contrast, there was a market economy in the more economically developed coastal areas of Massachusetts Bay and in the fertile Connecticut River Valley, driven by the activities of wholesale merchants dealing with Europe and the West Indies. The state government was dominated by this merchant class.

In 1784 British merchants began taking a hard line on New England's mercantile community due to the latter's frequent insolvencies. Five London merchant houses withdrew loans from New England merchants and some British businessmen refused to extend lines of credit to their counterparts in New England and insisted they pay for goods with hard currency, which was then in short supply in the United States. New England merchants began to demand the same of their local business partners, including those in market towns.

Responding to these developments, New England merchants began passing on this demand to their customers, although Governor John Hancock did not impose hard currency demands on poorer borrowers and refused to prosecute actively the collection of delinquent taxes. The rural farming population was generally unable to meet the demands of merchants and the civil authorities, and some began to lose their land and other possessions when they were unable to fulfill their debt and tax obligations. This led to strong resentment against tax collectors and the courts, where creditors obtained judgments against debtors and tax collectors obtained judgments authorizing property seizures. A farmer identified as "Plough Jogger" summarized the situation at a meeting convened by aggrieved commoners:

I have been greatly abused, have been obliged to do more than my part in the war, been loaded with class rates, town rates, province rates, Continental rates, and all rates ... been pulled and hauled by sheriffs, constables, and collectors, and had my cattle sold for less than they were worth ... The great men are going to get all we have and I think it is time for us to rise and put a stop to it, and have no more courts, nor sheriffs, nor collectors nor lawyers.

Veterans had received little pay during the war and faced added difficulty collecting payments owed to them from the State or the Congress of the Confederation. Some soldiers began to organize protests against these oppressive economic conditions. In 1780, Daniel Shays resigned from the army without pay and went home to find himself in court for nonpayment of debts. He soon realized that he was not alone in his inability to pay his debts and began organizing for debt relief.

== Early rumblings ==
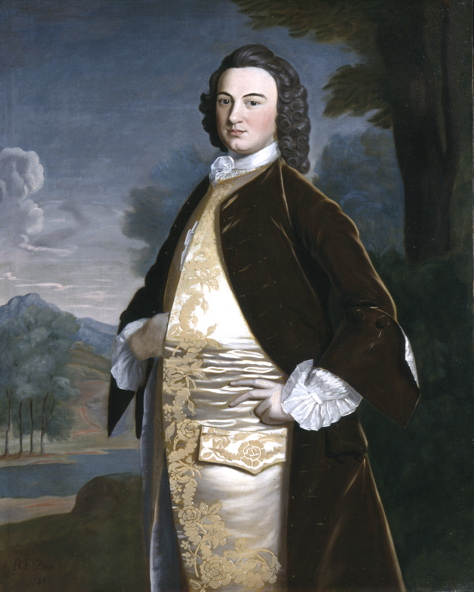
Governor James Bowdoin instituted a heavy tax burden and stepped up the collection of back taxes.

One early protest against the government was led by Job Shattuck of Groton, Massachusetts in 1782, who organized residents to physically prevent tax collectors from performing their duties. A second, larger-scale protest took place in Uxbridge, Massachusetts on the Rhode Island border on February 3, 1783, when a mob seized property that had been confiscated by a constable and returned it to its owners. Governor Hancock ordered the sheriff to suppress these actions.

Most rural communities attempted to use the legislative process to gain relief. Petitions and proposals were repeatedly submitted to the state legislature to issue paper currency, which would depreciate the currency and make it possible to pay a high-value debt with lower-valued paper. The merchants, including James Bowdoin, were opposed to the idea since they stood to lose from such measures, and the proposals were repeatedly rejected.

Governor Hancock resigned in early 1785 citing health reasons, though some suggested that he was anticipating trouble. Bowdoin had repeatedly lost to Hancock in earlier elections, but he was elected governor that year—and matters became more severe. He stepped up civil actions to collect back taxes, and the legislature exacerbated the situation by levying an additional property tax to raise funds for the state's portion of foreign debt payments. Even comparatively conservative commentators such as John Adams observed that these levies were "heavier than the People could bear".

== Shutting down the courts ==
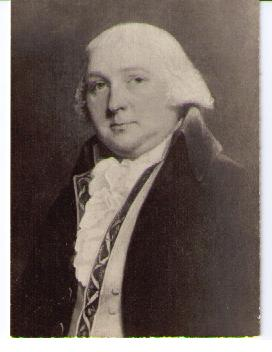
Militia general William Shepard defended the Springfield Armory against rebel action.

Protests in rural Massachusetts escalated into direct action in August 1786 after the state legislature adjourned without considering the many petitions sent to Boston. On August 29, a well-organized force of protestors formed in Northampton and successfully prevented the county court from sitting. The leaders of this force proclaimed that they were seeking relief from the burdensome judicial processes that were depriving the people of their land and possessions. They called themselves Regulators, a reference to the Regulator movement of North Carolina, which sought to reform corrupt practices in the late 1760s.

This modern map of Massachusetts is annotated to show points of conflict. Places where military conflicts occurred are highlighted in red; the others are locations of courthouses that were shut down.

Governor Bowdoin issued a proclamation on September 2 denouncing such mob action, but he took no military measures beyond planning a militia response to future actions. The court was then shut down in Worcester by similar action on September 5, but the county militia refused to turn out, as it was composed mainly of men sympathetic to the protestors. Governors of the neighboring states acted decisively, calling out the militia to hunt down the ringleaders in their own states after the first such protests. Matters were resolved without violence in Rhode Island because the "country party" gained control of the legislature in 1786 and enacted measures forcing its merchants to trade debt instruments for devalued currency. Boston's merchants were concerned by this, especially Bowdoin, who held more than £3,000 in Massachusetts notes.

Daniel Shays had participated in the Northampton action and began to take a more active role in the uprising in November, though he firmly denied being one of its leaders. The Supreme Judicial Court of Massachusetts indicted 11 leaders of the rebellion as "disorderly, riotous, and seditious persons". The court was scheduled to meet next in Springfield, on September 26, and Shays organized an attempt to shut it down in Northampton, while Luke Day organized an attempt in Springfield. They were anticipated by William Shepard, the local militia commander, who began gathering militiamen the Saturday before the court was to sit, and he had 300 men protecting the Springfield courthouse by opening time. Shays and Day were able to recruit a similar number but chose only to demonstrate, exercising their troops outside of Shepard's lines rather than attempting to seize the building. The judges first postponed hearings and then adjourned on the 28th without hearing any cases. Shepard withdrew his force (which had grown to around 800 men) to the Springfield Armory, which was rumored to be the target of the protestors.

Protests were also successful in shutting down courts in Great Barrington, Concord, and Taunton, in September and October. James Warren wrote to John Adams on October 22, "We are now in a state of Anarchy and Confusion bordering on Civil War." Courts were able to meet in the larger towns and cities, but they required protection of the militia, which Bowdoin called in for the purpose. Governor Bowdoin commanded the legislature to "vindicate the insulted dignity of government". Samuel Adams claimed that foreigners ("British emissaries") were instigating treason among citizens. Adams helped draft a Riot Act and a resolution suspending habeas corpus so that authorities could legally keep people in jail without trial.

Adams proposed a new legal distinction that rebellion in a republic should be punished by death. The legislature also moved to make some concessions on matters that upset farmers, saying that certain old taxes could now be paid in goods instead of hard currency. These measures were followed by one prohibiting speech critical of the government and offering pardons to protestors willing to take an oath of allegiance. These legislative actions were unsuccessful in quelling the protests, and the suspension of habeas corpus alarmed many.

Warrants were issued for the arrest of several of the protest ringleaders, and a posse of around 300 men rode to Groton on November 28 to arrest Job Shattuck and other rebel leaders in the area. Shattuck was chased down and arrested on the 30th and was wounded by a sword slash in the process. This action and the arrest of other protest leaders in the eastern parts of the state angered those in the west, and they began to organize an overthrow of the state government. "The seeds of war are now sown", wrote one correspondent in Shrewsbury, and by mid-January, rebel leaders spoke of smashing the "tyrannical government of Massachusetts".

== Rebellion ==
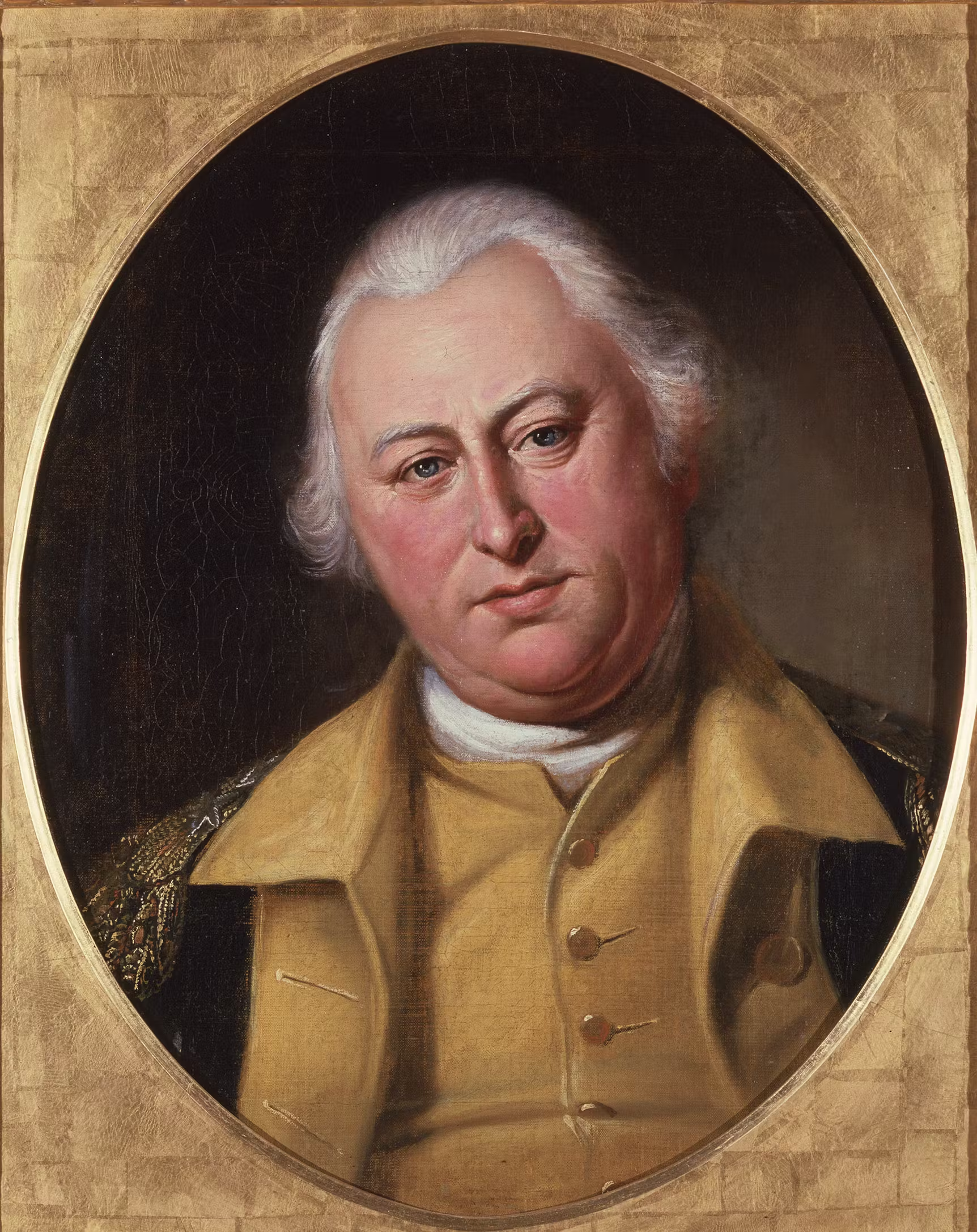
Portrait of Benjamin Lincoln by Charles Willson Peale

The federal government had been unable to recruit soldiers for the army because of a lack of funding, so Massachusetts leaders decided to act independently. On January 4, 1787, Governor Bowdoin proposed creating a privately funded militia army. Former Continental Army General Benjamin Lincoln solicited funds and raised more than £6,000 from more than 125 merchants by the end of January. The 3,000 militiamen who were recruited into this army were almost entirely from the eastern counties of Massachusetts, and they marched to Worcester on January 19.

While the government forces assembled, Shays, Day, and other rebel leaders in the west organized their forces, establishing regional regimental organizations that were run by democratically elected committees. Their first major target was the federal armory in Springfield. General Shepard had taken possession of the armory under orders from Governor Bowdoin, and he used its arsenal to arm a militia force of 1,200. He had done this even though the armory was federal property, not state, and he did not have permission from Secretary of War Henry Knox.

The insurgents were organized into three major groups and intended to simultaneously surround and attack the armory. Shays had one group east of Springfield near Palmer. Luke Day had a second force across the Connecticut River in West Springfield. A third force under Eli Parsons was situated to the north at Chicopee. The rebels originally had planned their assault for January 25 – at the last moment, Day sent a message to Shays indicating that he would not be ready to attack until the 26th. Day's message was intercepted by Shepard's men. As such, the militias of Shays and Parsons approached the armory on the 25th not knowing that they would have no support from the west. Instead, they found Shepard's militia waiting for them. Shepard first ordered warning shots fired over the heads of Shays's men. He then ordered two cannons to fire grapeshot. Four Shaysites were killed and 20 wounded. There was no musket fire from either side. The rebel advance collapsed with most of the rebel forces fleeing north. Shays' and Day's men eventually regrouped at Amherst, Massachusetts.

General Lincoln immediately began marching west from Worcester with the 3,000 men that had been mustered. The rebels moved generally north and east to avoid him, eventually establishing a camp at Petersham, Massachusetts. They raided the shops of local merchants for supplies along the way and took some of the merchants hostage. Lincoln pursued them and reached Pelham on February 2, around 20 miles (32 km) from Petersham. He led his militia on a forced march to Petersham through a bitter snowstorm on the night of February 3, arriving early in the morning. They surprised the rebel camp so thoroughly that the rebels scattered "without time to call in their out parties or even their guards". Lincoln claimed to have captured 150 men but none of them were officers, and historian Leonard Richards has questioned the veracity of the report. Most of the leadership escaped north into New Hampshire and Vermont, where they were sheltered despite repeated demands that they be returned to Massachusetts for trial.

== Aftermath ==
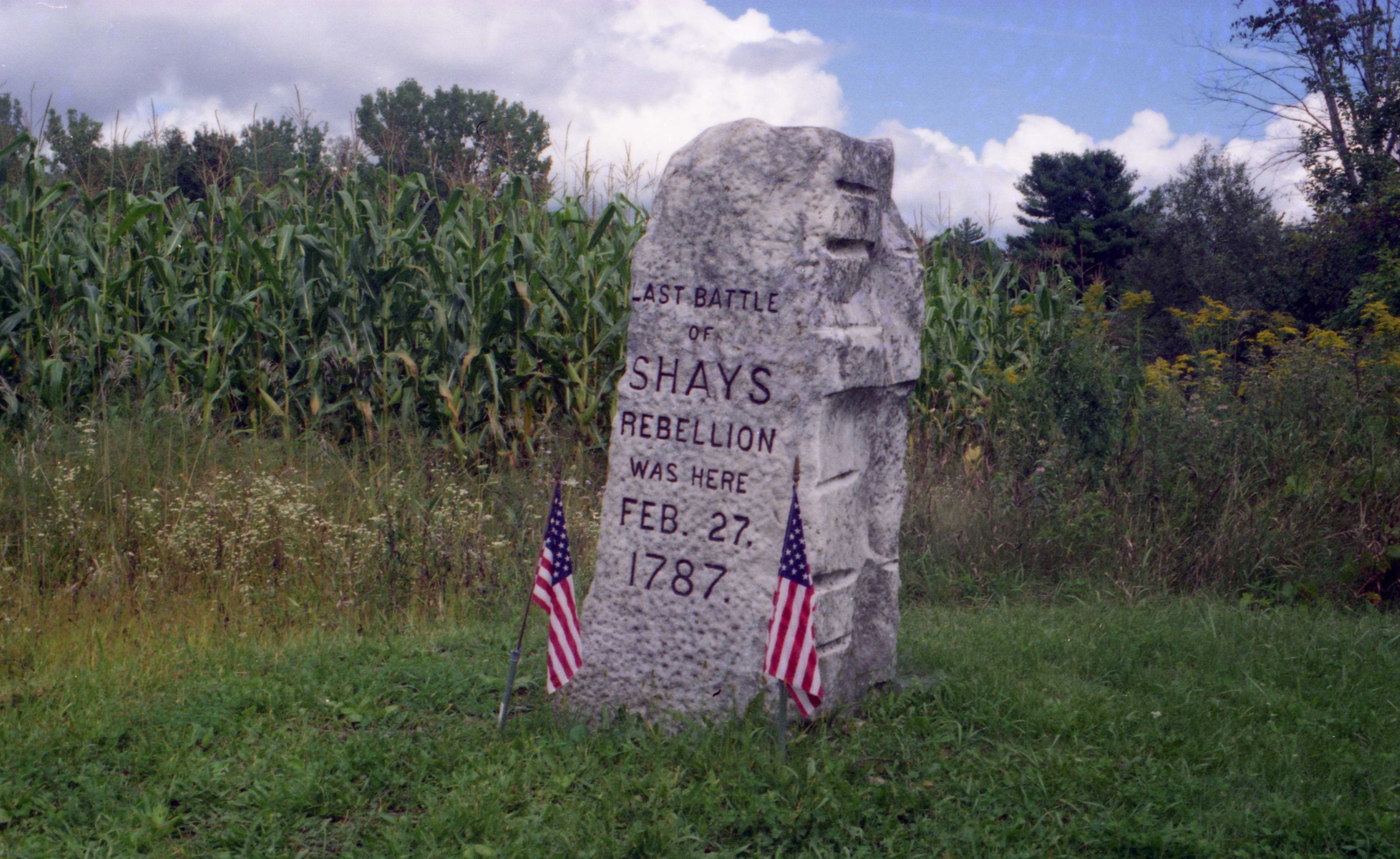
This monument marks the location of the final Shays's Rebellion battle in Sheffield, Massachusetts.

Lincoln's march marked the end of large-scale organized resistance. Ringleaders who eluded capture fled to neighboring states, and pockets of local resistance continued. Some rebel leaders sought assistance from Lord Dorchester, the British governor of the Province of Quebec who reportedly promised assistance in the form of Mohawk warriors led by Joseph Brant. Dorchester's proposal was vetoed in London, however, and no assistance came to the rebels. The same day that Lincoln arrived at Petersham, the state legislature passed bills authorizing a state of martial law and giving the governor broad powers to act against the rebels. The bills also authorized state payments to reimburse Lincoln and the merchants who had funded the army and authorized the recruitment of additional militia. On February 16, 1787, the Massachusetts legislature passed the Disqualification Act to prevent a legislative response by rebel sympathizers. This bill forbade any acknowledged rebels from holding a variety of elected and appointed offices.

Most of Lincoln's army melted away in late February as enlistments expired, and he commanded only 30 men at a base in Pittsfield by the end of the month. In the meantime, around 120 rebels had regrouped in New Lebanon, New York, and they crossed the border on February 27, marching first on Stockbridge, a major market town in the southwestern corner of Massachusetts. They raided merchants' shops and the homes of merchants and local professionals, establishing an operational headquarters at Bingham's Tavern. This came to the attention of Brigadier John Ashley, who mustered a force of around 80 men and caught up with the rebels in nearby Sheffield late in the day for the bloodiest encounter of the rebellion: 30 rebels were wounded (one mortally), at least one government soldier was killed, and many were wounded. Ashley was further reinforced after the encounter, and he reported taking 150 prisoners.

== Consequences ==
Four thousand people signed confessions acknowledging participation in the events of the rebellion in exchange for amnesty. Several hundred participants were eventually indicted on charges relating to the rebellion, but most of these were pardoned under a general amnesty that excluded only a few ringleaders. Eighteen men were convicted and sentenced to death, but most of these had their sentences commuted or overturned on appeal or were pardoned. John Bly and Charles Rose were hanged on December 6, 1787. They were also accused of a common-law crime for looting.

Shays was pardoned in 1788 and he returned to Massachusetts from hiding in the Vermont woods. He was vilified by the Boston press, who painted him as an archetypal anarchist opposed to the government. He later moved to the Conesus, New York area, where he died poor and obscure in 1825.

The crushing of the rebellion and the harsh terms of reconciliation imposed by the Disqualification Act all worked against Governor Bowdoin politically. He received few votes from the rural parts of the state and was trounced by John Hancock in the gubernatorial election of 1787. The military victory was tempered by tax changes in subsequent years. The legislature cut taxes and placed a moratorium on debts and also refocused state spending away from interest payments, resulting in a 30-percent decline in the value of Massachusetts securities as those payments fell in arrears.

Vermont was an unrecognized independent republic that had been seeking independent statehood from New York's claims to the territory. It became an unexpected beneficiary of the rebellion by sheltering the rebel ringleaders. Alexander Hamilton broke from other New Yorkers, including major landowners with claims on Vermont territory, calling for the state to recognize and support Vermont's bid for admission to the union. He cited Vermont's de facto independence and its ability to cause trouble by providing support to the discontented from neighboring states, and he introduced legislation that broke the impasse between New York and Vermont. Vermonters responded favorably to the overture by publicly pushing Eli Parsons and Luke Day out of the state (but quietly continuing to support others). Vermont became the fourteenth state after negotiations with New York and the passage of the new constitution.

== Impact on the Constitution ==
I own I am not a friend to a very energetic government. It is always oppressive. The late rebellion in Massachusets has given more alarm than I think it should have done. Calculate that one rebellion in 13 states in the course of 11 years, is but one for each state in a century and a half. No country should be so long without one. Nor will any degree of power in the hands of government prevent insurrections.

— Thomas Jefferson, 20 December 1787

Thomas Jefferson was serving as ambassador to France at the time and refused to be alarmed by Shays's Rebellion. He argued in a letter to James Madison on January 30, 1787, that occasional rebellion serves to preserve freedoms. In a letter to William Stephens Smith on November 13, 1787, Jefferson wrote, "The tree of liberty must be refreshed from time to time with the blood of patriots and tyrants. It is its natural manure." In contrast, George Washington had been calling for constitutional reform for many years, and he wrote in a letter dated October 31, 1786, to Henry Lee, "You talk, my good sir, of employing influence to appease the present tumults in Massachusetts. I know not where that influence is to be found, or, if attainable, that it would be a proper remedy for the disorders. Influence is not government. Let us have a government by which our lives, liberties, and properties will be secured, or let us know the worst at once."

=== Influence upon the Constitutional Convention ===
At the time of the rebellion, the weaknesses of the federal government as constituted under the Articles of Confederation were apparent to many. A vigorous debate was going on throughout the states on the need for a stronger central government, with Federalists arguing for the idea, and Anti-Federalists opposing them. Historical opinion is divided on what sort of role the rebellion played in the formation and later ratification of the United States Constitution, although most scholars agree that it played some role, at least temporarily drawing some anti-Federalists to the strong government side.

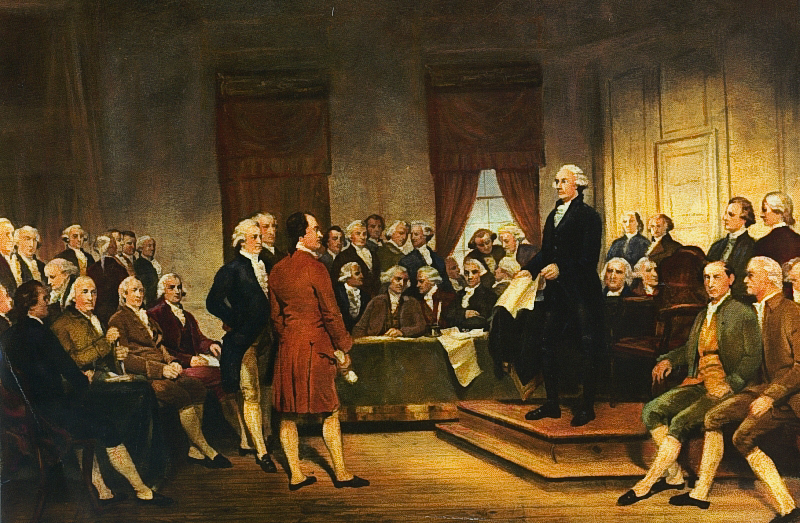
The 1787 Constitutional Convention by Junius Brutus Stearns, 1856

By early 1785, many influential merchants and political leaders were already agreed that a stronger central government was needed. Shortly after Shays's Rebellion broke out, delegates from five states met in Annapolis, Maryland from September 11–14, 1786, and they concluded that vigorous steps were needed to reform the federal government, but they disbanded because of a lack of full representation and authority, calling for a convention of all the states to be held in Philadelphia in May 1787. Historian Robert Feer notes that several prominent figures had hoped that the convention would fail, requiring a larger-scale convention, and French diplomat Louis-Guillaume Otto thought that the convention was intentionally broken off early to achieve this end.

In early 1787, John Jay wrote that the rural disturbances and the inability of the central government to fund troops in response made "the inefficiency of the Federal government more and more manifest". Henry Knox observed that the uprising in Massachusetts clearly influenced local leaders who had previously opposed a strong federal government. Historian David Szatmary writes that the timing of the rebellion "convinced the elites of sovereign states that the proposed gathering at Philadelphia must take place". Some states delayed choosing delegates to the proposed convention, including Massachusetts, in part because it resembled the "extra-legal" conventions organized by the protestors before the rebellion became violent.

=== Influence upon the Constitution ===
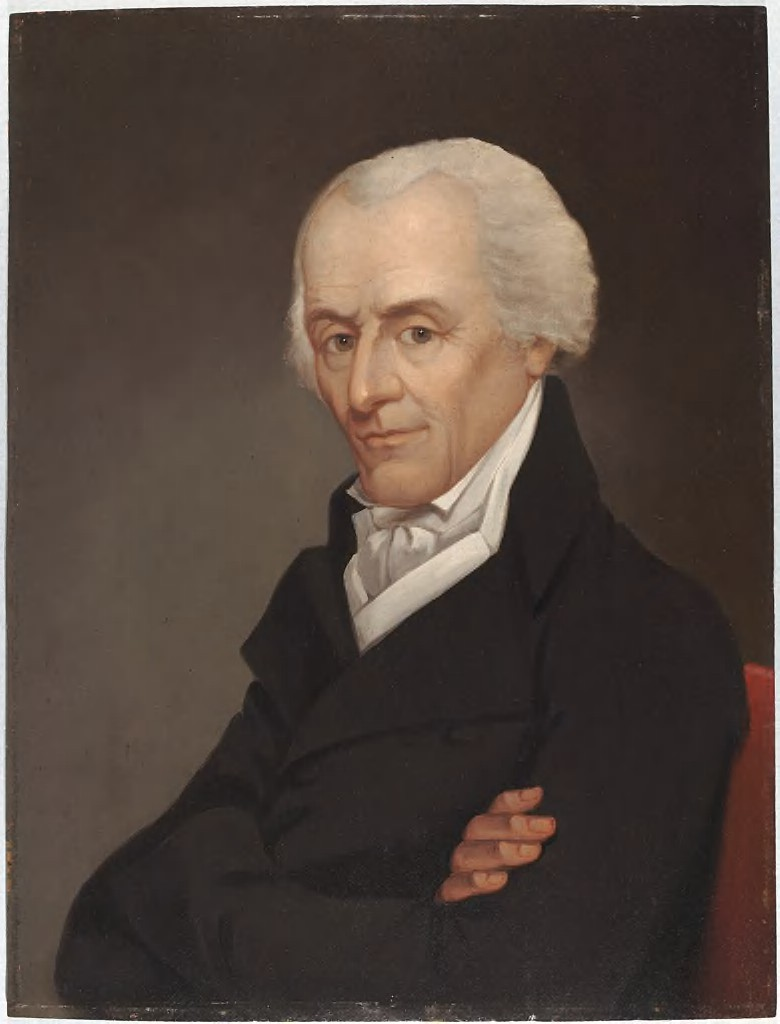
Elbridge Gerry, depicted in this 1861 portrait, opposed the Constitution as drafted, although his reasons for doing so were not strongly influenced by the rebellion.

The convention that met in Philadelphia then was dominated by strong-government advocates. Delegate Oliver Ellsworth of Connecticut argued that because the people could not be trusted (as exemplified by Shays's Rebellion), the members of the federal House of Representatives should be chosen by state legislatures, not by popular vote. The example of Shays's Rebellion may also have been influential in the addition of language to the constitution concerning the ability of states to manage domestic violence, and their ability to demand the return of individuals from other states for trial.

The rebellion also played a role in the discussion of the number of chief executives the United States would have going forward. While mindful of tyranny, delegates of the Constitutional Convention thought that the single executive would be more effective in responding to national disturbances.

Federalists cited the rebellion as an example of the confederation government's weaknesses, while opponents such as Elbridge Gerry, a merchant speculator and Massachusetts delegate from Essex County, thought that a federal response to the rebellion would have been even worse than that of the state. He was one of the few convention delegates who refused to sign the new constitution, although his reasons for doing so did not stem from the rebellion.

=== Influence upon ratification ===
When the constitution had been drafted, Massachusetts was viewed by Federalists as a state that might not ratify it, because of widespread anti-Federalist sentiment in the rural parts of the state. Massachusetts Federalists, including Henry Knox, were active in courting swing votes in the debates leading up to the state's ratifying convention in 1788. When the vote was taken on February 6, 1788, representatives of rural communities involved in the rebellion voted against ratification by a wide margin, but a coalition of merchants, urban elites, and market town leaders helped carry the day; the state ratified the constitution by a vote of 187 to 168.

Historians are divided on the impact the rebellion had on the ratification debates. Robert Feer notes that major Federalist pamphleteers rarely mentioned it and that some anti-Federalists used the fact that Massachusetts survived the rebellion as evidence that a new constitution was unnecessary. Leonard Richards counters that publications like the Pennsylvania Gazette explicitly tied anti-Federalist opinion to the rebel cause, calling opponents of the new constitution "Shaysites" and the Federalists "Washingtonians".

David Szatmary argues that debate in some states was affected, particularly in Massachusetts, where the rebellion had a polarizing effect. Richards records Henry Jackson's observation that opposition to ratification in Massachusetts was motivated by "that cursed spirit of insurgency", but that broader opposition in other states originated in other constitutional concerns expressed by Elbridge Gerry, who published a widely distributed pamphlet outlining his concerns about the vagueness of some of the powers granted in the constitution and its lack of a Bill of Rights.

The military powers enshrined in the constitution were soon put to use by President George Washington. After the passage by the United States Congress of the Whiskey Act, protest against the taxes it imposed began in western Pennsylvania. The protests escalated and Washington led federal and state militia to put down what is now known as the Whiskey Rebellion.

== Memorials ==
The events and people of the uprising are commemorated in the towns where its participants lived and those where events took place. Sheffield erected a memorial (pictured above) marking the site of the "last battle" on the Sheffield-Egremont Road in Sheffield, across the road from the Appalachian Trail trailhead. Pelham memorialized Daniel Shays by naming the portion of US Route 202 that runs through Pelham the Daniel Shays Highway. A statue of General Shepard was erected in his hometown of Westfield.

In the town of Petersham, Massachusetts, a memorial was erected in 1927 by the New England Society of Brooklyn, New York, in commemoration of General Benjamin Lincoln's rout of the Shaysite forces there on the morning of February 4. The lengthy inscription is typical of the traditional, pro-government interpretation, ending with the line, "Obedience to the law is true liberty."

== See also ==
- Fries's Rebellion
- List of incidents of civil unrest in the United States
- Newburgh Conspiracy
- Paper Money Riot
- Tax resistance in the United States
- Whiskey Rebellion
- Early American currency

== Bibliography ==
- Bacon, Edwin M., ed. (1896). Supplement to the Acts and Resolves of Massachusetts. Boston: Geo. Ellis. p. 148. OCLC 14050329.
- Feer, Robert (September 1969). "Shays's Rebellion and the Constitution: A Study in Causation". The New England Quarterly. 42 (3): 388–410. doi:10.2307/363616. JSTOR 363616.
- Foner, Eric (2006). Give Me Liberty! An American History. New York: W.W. Norton. ISBN 978-0-393-92782-5. OCLC 61479662.
- Holland, Josiah Gilbert (1855). History of Western Massachusetts. Springfield, MA: S. Bowles. p. 245. OCLC 505288328.
- Lodge, Henry Cabot (1889). American Statesmen: George Washington. Houghton, Mifflin. p. 26. OCLC 123204544.
- Manuel, Frank Edward; Manuel, Fritzie Prigohzy (2004). James Bowdoin and the Patriot Philosophers. Philadelphia: American Philosophical Society. ISBN 978-0-87169-247-4. OCLC 231993575.
- Morse, Anson (1909). The Federalist Party in Massachusetts to the Year 1800. Princeton, NJ: Princeton University Press. OCLC 718724.
- North, Gary (February 9, 2004). "John Hancock's Big Toe and the Constitution". LewRockwell.com.
- Richards, Leonard L (2002). Shays's Rebellion: The American Revolution's Final Battle. Philadelphia: University of Pennsylvania Press. ISBN 978-0-8122-1870-1. OCLC 56029217.
- Swift, Esther M. (1969). West Springfield Massachusetts: A Town History. Springfield, MA: F. A. Bassette Company. OCLC 69843.
- Szatmary, David P. (1980). Shays' Rebellion: The Making of an Agrarian Insurrection. University of Massachusetts Press. ISBN 978-0-87023-419-4.
- Zinn, Howard (2005). A People's History of the United States. New York: HarperCollins. ISBN 978-0-06-083865-2. OCLC 61265580.
