= West Springfield Generating Station =

Power plant in Massachusetts, U.S.

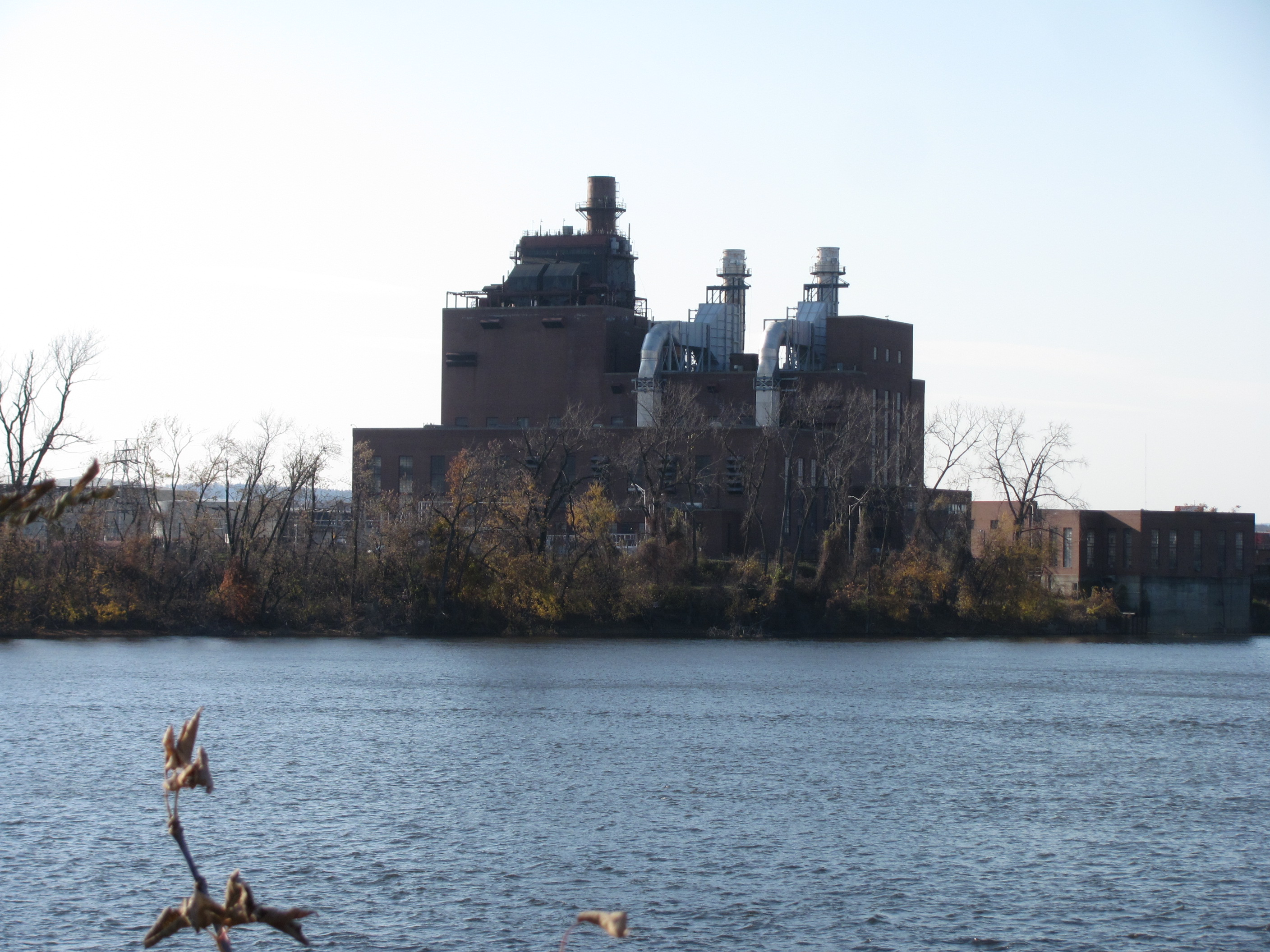
- West Springfield Generating Station in 2011
- Country: United States
- Location: 5 Agawam Avenue West Springfield, Massachusetts 1089
- Coordinates: 42°5′44.4″N 72°35′44.5″W
- Status: Being decommissioned
- Commission date: 1949
- Decommission date: 2022
- Owner: Cogentrix Energy

Thermal power station
- Primary fuel: Natural gas/diesel fuel/kerosene
- Turbine technology: Combustion turbine

Power generation
- Nameplate capacity: 259 megawatts

External links
- Commons: Related media on Commons

The West Springfield Generating Station, also known by its corporate name EP Energy Massachusetts, LLC, was a fossil-fuel-fired power plant located in West Springfield, Massachusetts. The station was a "peaking" facility, meaning that it primarily operates during peak electrical demand. The facility consisted of two 49-megawatt (MW) combustion turbine generators (Units 1 and 2) fueled by natural gas or ultra low-sulphur diesel fuel, one 18 MW jet turbine (Unit 10) that was fueled by kerosene, and one 107 MW simple-cycle steam boiler unit (Unit 3) burning no. 6 fuel oil, ULSD or natural gas. The station also had a small auxiliary boiler for process and building heat and an emergency back-up generator.

The plant was shut down in June 2022 and is scheduled to be demolished. The generators have been sold and dismantling had begun in the summer of 2022 with the jet turbine disconnected and removed from the site by August 2022.

== Information ==
Owned by Cogentrix Energy, the West Springfield Generating Station is located at 15 Agawam Ave. in West Springfield, Massachusetts and is located south of the Memorial Bridge. The power plant and the adjacent West Springfield Substation were built in 1949 by Western Massachusetts Electric Company, a subsidiary of Northeast Utilities (now Eversource Energy). The original station consisted of two simple-cycle steam units (Units 1 and 2) which burned both oil and coal at different periods of their existence. Unit 3 was added in 1957 and the jet turbine was added in 1969. In 1999 the Station was acquired by Con Edison and the plant's corporate name became Con Edison Energy Massachusetts, Inc. By that time, the plant had become a reserve facility only used at times of very high system load. In 2002, Con Edison converted the plant into a peaking facility by replacing the original boiler Units 1 and 2 with the current combustion turbines. The facility did not operate often and was primarily used to maintain grid reliability in the area. Due to the current New England market conditions, none of the plant's units fared well, revenue-wise, but in 2005 it was determined by ISO New England that the station was needed for reliability purposes and CEEMI was awarded Reliability Must Run agreements in 2005 from ISO New England for the station's units. In RMR agreements, the electricity market agrees to subsidize the costs of operating units which are deemed necessary but are unable to make enough revenue to pay operational costs. Generally these are paid for by increasing electricity rates to customers. In 2008, Con Edison sold CEEMI to North American Energy Alliance, Inc. now known as Essential Power LLC, which is a joint venture owned by AllCapital and IFM. Essential Power was subsequently acquired by Cogentrix Energy, under ownership of funds managed by The Carlyle Group. In 2019, the plant did not receive a contract to supply peak power and the owners decided to decommission it.

Steam Units 1 and 2 were permanently retired as of December 31, 2000 (last used in 1999) and the boilers decommissioned. During the decommissioning of Units 1 and 2 the plant's coal chute located on the outside of the boiler hall was removed and the original brick exhaust stacks were replaced with metallic stacks. The two simple-cycle, gas-fired combustion turbine generators (CTG1 & 2), having a total nominal capacity of 98 MW were installed and began operating June 5, 2002. Gas turbines are capable of starting up and responding much faster to changing electricity demand than steam units, making them much more desirable as peaking units than the original boilers. In addition, the CTGs emit far less air pollution and require far less cooling water. Each exhaust housing contained selective catalytic reduction (SCR) and an oxidation catalyst system for the control of nitrogen oxides (NOx). The company did not install a heat recovery steam generator with these units.

The plant used the Connecticut River as its source of cooling water. Unit 3, as a steam unit, had to reject waste heat from its condenser to a water source. A once-through cooling system utilizing water from the river removed waste heat from Unit 3's condenser. The circulating water pumps are located in the plant's pump house across the highway from the facility directly on the Connecticut River. Unit 3 could require up to 6 million gallons per day of water when operating. Units 1, 2, and 10 rejected all of their waste heat from combustion to the atmosphere via the exhaust stacks. However, Units 1 and 2 required a small amount of cooling water to remove heat from the lubricating oil system for the turbines. A small service water system operating at 730 gpm continuously provided cooling water for that purpose. Unit 10 did not require any cooling water at all.

Units 1 and 2 had an operational constraint of 4800 hours/year based on the Massachusetts Department of Environmental Protection (MA DEP) Air Quality Plan Approval. The MA DEP has recently granted approval to NAEA to operate the units an additional 720 hours per year using distillate fuel oil. According to the plant management, Unit 3 could operate at about 10–20% of its capacity.

Electricity was supplied to the grid at the adjacent Eversource Energy owned substation located directly behind the plant. All four units generated power at 13.8 kilovolts (kV). Units 1 and 10 supplied power directly via the 13.8 kV local distribution system fed out of the substation. Unit 3, and since 2002 unit 2, supplied power to the 115 kV transmission switchyard at the substation via generator step-up transformers (GSU). The plant could be started with no off-site power available and with only the on-site emergency diesel generator providing electricity to plant systems. As a result, the West Springfield plant was capable of starting and supplying power to local loads in the event of a complete grid failure or in the event that the utility substation through which it transmits power is isolated from the rest of the grid, known as "black start" capability.

== Installed equipment ==
Unit No.	Description	Capacity	Start date	Fuel
1	Combustion Engineering Boiler	48 MW	Decommissioned	No. 6 Fuel oil
2	Combustion Engineering Boiler	48 MW	Decommissioned	No. 6 Fuel oil
CT-1	Combustion turbine	49 MW	2002	N. gas / ultra low-sulfur diesel (ULSD)
CT-2	Combustion turbine	49 MW	2002	N. gas / ultra low-sulfur diesel (ULSD)
3	Combustion Engineering Boiler	107 MW	1957	No. 6 Fuel Oil / N. gas / ultra low-sulfur diesel (ULSD)
10	Pratt & Whitney FT4a-8LF Combustion turbine	18 MW	1969	ultra low-sulfur kerosene (ULSK)
Doreen Street	Pratt & Whitney FT4a-8LF Combustion turbine	18 MW		ultra low-sulfur kerosene (ULSK)
Woodland Road	Pratt & Whitney FT4a-8LF combustion turbine	18 MW		ultra low-sulfur kerosene (ULSK)
Aux. Boiler	Cleaver Brooks Package boiler	14MM BTU/hr (heat only)	1994	No. 2 Fuel oil
Emergency Generator	Reiner Generator set	5 KW	1955	Natural gas
