= Mittineague =

Neighborhood in West Springfield, Massachusetts, U.S.

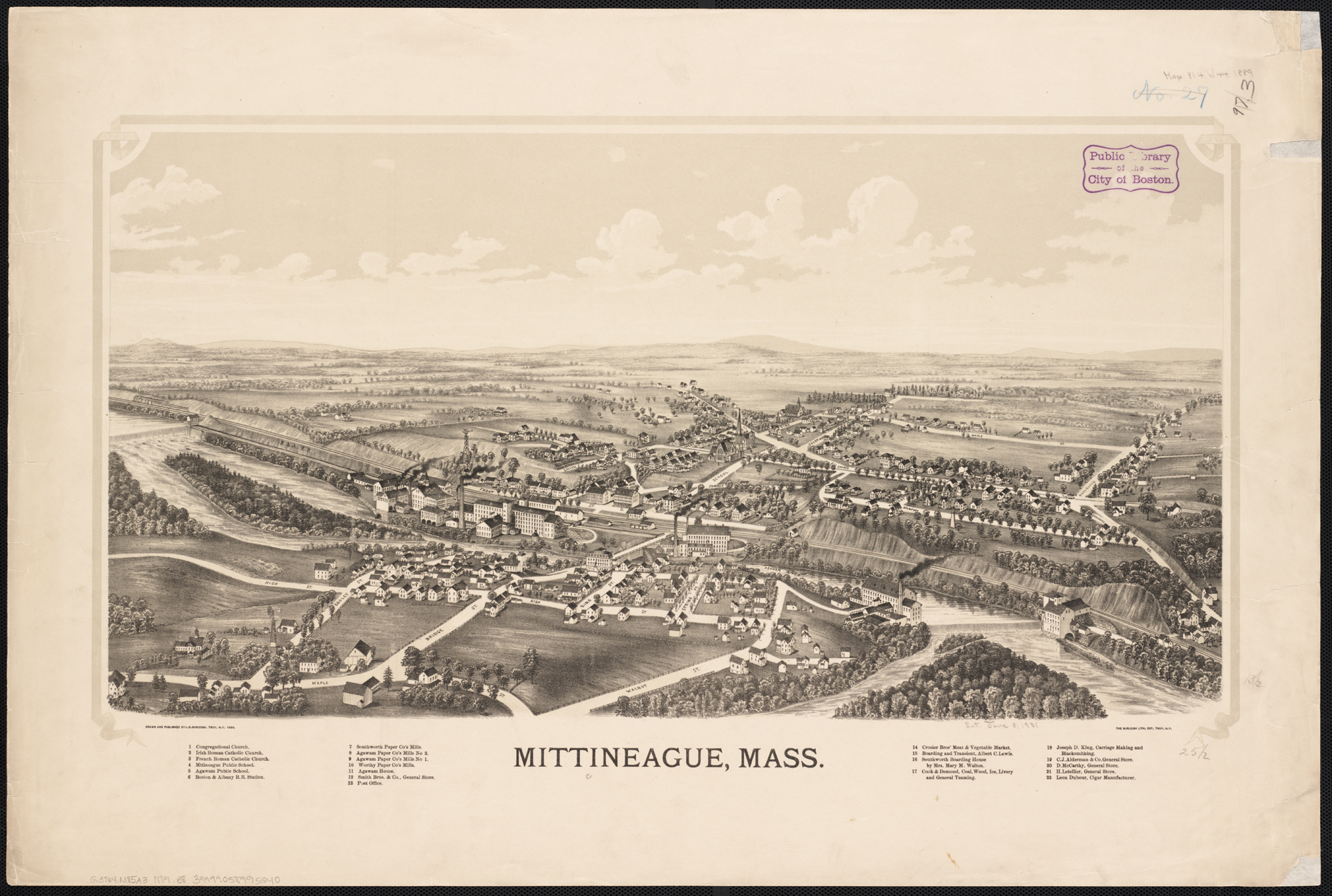
Print of Mittineague, Massachusetts by L.R. Burleigh

Mittineague is a neighborhood along the Westfield River in Southern West Springfield, Massachusetts. Two smaller parts of the neighborhood are Mittineague Falls, and Mittineague Park (the actual park and surrounding area).

== History ==
The area of Mittineague was first settled in 1739. The area was not highly valued until a railroad from Worcester, MA to Boston was extended to Albany through Mittineague creating opportunities for industrial development, primarily the manufacturing of paper. The mills and the Great Famine (Ireland) brought many Irish immigrants who developed Mittineague into a thriving village within West Springfield. . Between 1850 and 1860 the population of the town nearly doubled. The Agawam Paper Co., the Mittineague Paper Co., the Strathmore Paper Co., the Worthy Paper Co.and the Southworth Paper Co. were the most prominent of the mills found along the banks of Mittineague Falls.

In 1870, Mitteneague (now Mittineague) School was built, and had a student body of around 250. A "station" church was established on Pine St. and within a few years became the independent parish of St. Thomas the Apostle. By the early 1900s, the population slowly dropped, and making the population around 1,500. By the 1950s, the population slowly rose again to its current population, 2,544 (2010).

== Schools ==
There is one school in West Springfield Public Schools called Mittineague Elementary. A private school in the neighborhood is St. Thomas the Apostle School.
