= Merrick, West Springfield =

Neighborhood in Springfield, Massachusetts, United States

Coordinates: 42°5′58.5″N 72°36′25.4″W

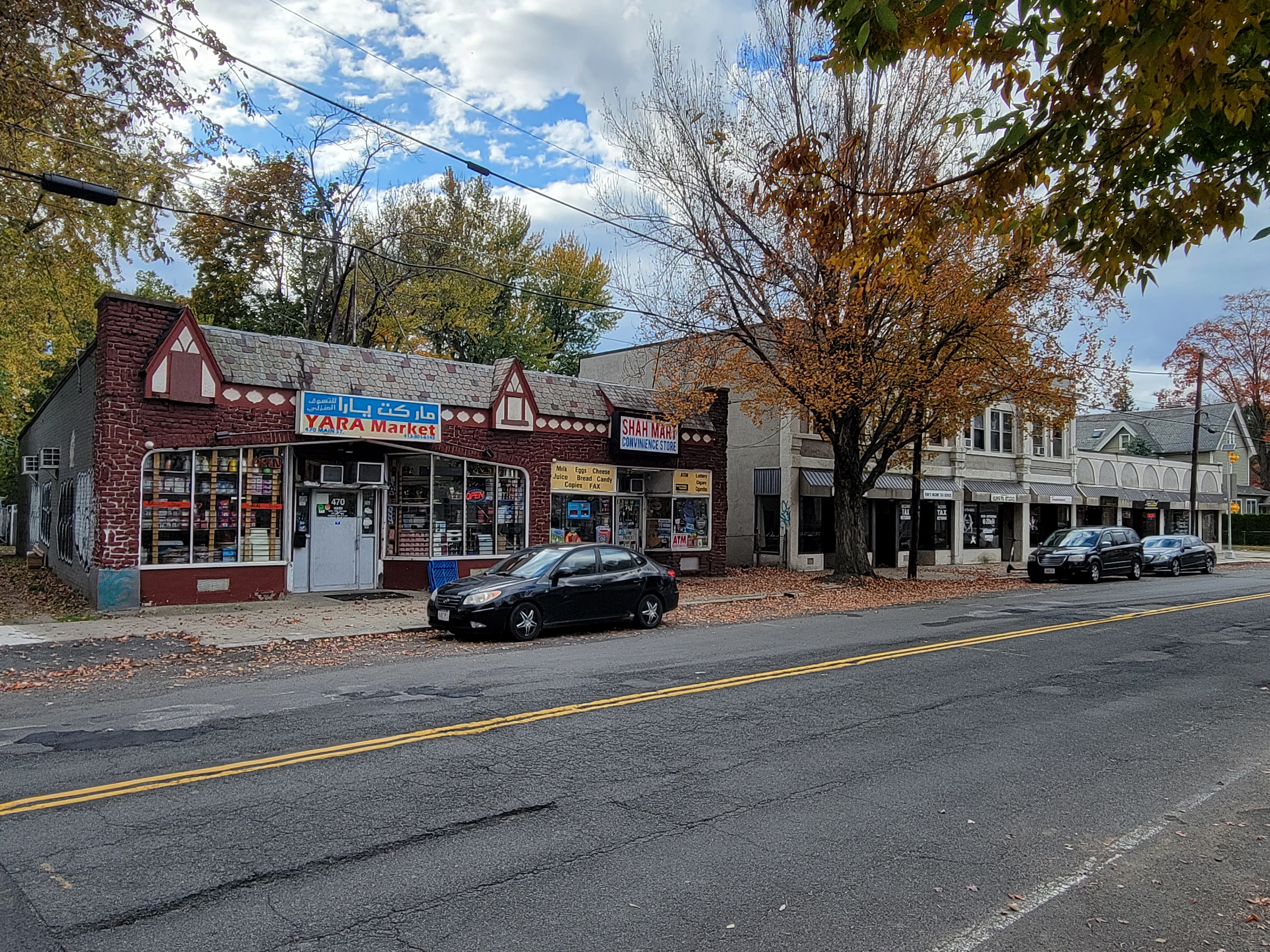
Main Street

Merrick is a neighborhood in the southeast corner of West Springfield, Massachusetts. Borders are, Park Ave to the north, Union St. and its industrial buildings to the west, and Bridge St. (or New Bridge St.) to the south and U.S. Route 5. Downtown is to the north and northwest and the neighborhood Memorial, is to the south and southwest. The Connecticut River is to the east. The population as of 2010 was 2,986.

== Tornadoes ==
Three tornadoes are known to have affected the Merrick area. Once in 1923, 1972 (or '7s; EF1 or EF2) and most notably the 2011 New England tornado outbreak on June 1, 2011, which was an EF3.

== Downtown West Springfield ==
Downtown West Springfield is the "center" of the city. It sits on the Connecticut River.
