= West Springfield, Massachusetts =

- City
- Town of West Springfield^{[*]}
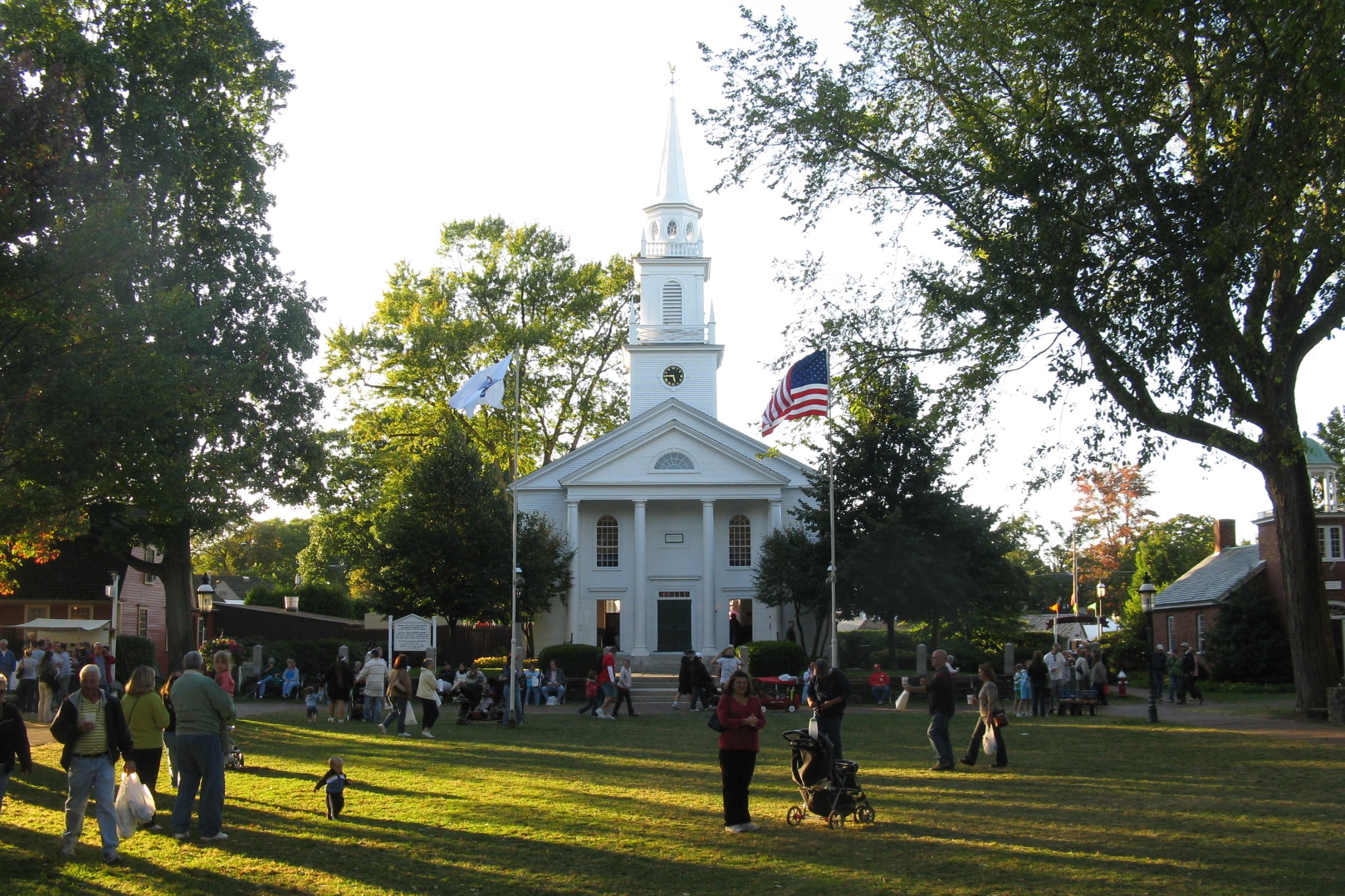
- Storrowton Green at the Eastern States Exposition

- Flag Seal
- Nicknames: West Side, "Crossroads of New England"
- Location in Hampden County in Massachusetts

- Location in the United States
- Coordinates: 42°06′25″N 72°37′15″W
- Country: United States
- State: Massachusetts
- County: Hampden
- Settled: 1655
- Incorporated (town): 1774
- Incorporated (city): 2000

Government
  - Type: Mayor-council city
  - Mayor: William Reichelt (I)

Area
  - Total: 17.54 sq mi (45.42 km^{2})
  - Land: 16.73 sq mi (43.33 km^{2})
  - Water: 0.81 sq mi (2.09 km^{2})
- Elevation: 66 ft (20 m)

Population (2020)
  - Total: 28,835
  - Density: 1,723.5/sq mi (665.45/km^{2})
- Time zone: UTC−5 (Eastern)
  - Summer (DST): UTC−4 (Eastern)
- ZIP code: 01089
- Area code: 413
- FIPS code: 25-77850
- GNIS feature ID: 0618194
- Website: townofwestspringfield.org

West Springfield is a city in Hampden County, Massachusetts, United States. It is part of the Springfield, Massachusetts Metropolitan Statistical Area. The population was 28,835 at the 2020 United States Census. The city is also known as "West Side", in reference to the fact that it is on the western side of the Connecticut River from Springfield, a fact which played a major part in the town's early history.

== History ==
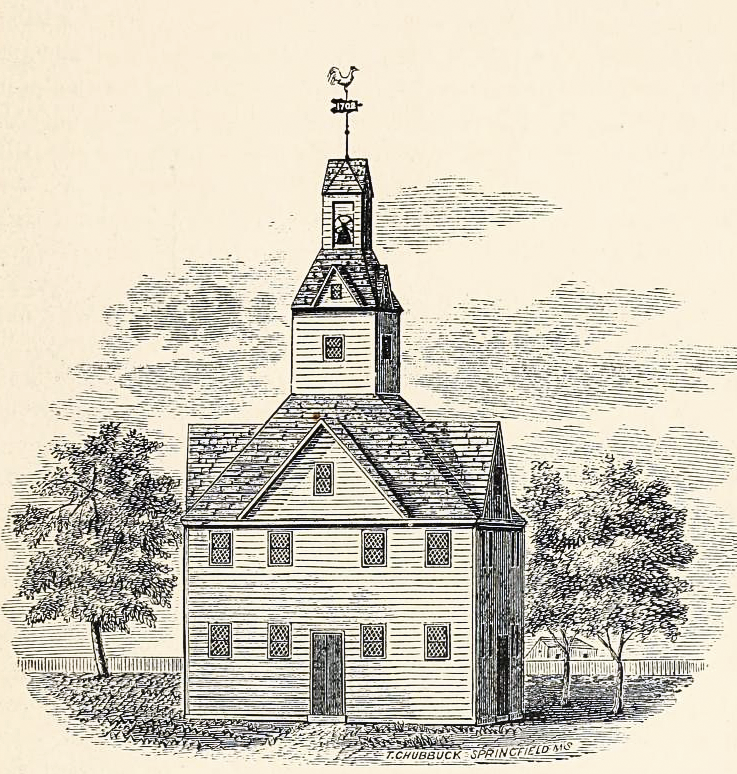
The First Meetinghouse of West Springfield, serving as its church and public meeting space, the 92-foot (28 m) tall structure was built on the common in 1702, and demolished in 1820

=== Early settlement ===
The area that became known as West Springfield was settled in 1635. The settlers fled to higher ground on the east side of the river and founded Springfield in the aftermath of the great hurricane of 1635. West Springfield was good farm land, so some families did stay on the west side.

==== Early transportation problems ====
Other than the trade in beaver skins, economic activity in early colonial Springfield consisted largely of subsistence farming and animal husbandry, with barter being the preferred medium of exchange for neighbors' crops, and locally produced goods. Gristmills and saw mills were also present in the early settlement.

Because the Connecticut River was too wide to be bridged at the time, crossings had to be made by boat. The Hay Place was created between the current town common and East School Street, for people who farmed or mowed on land grants on the west side to leave their crops while they awaited transport back to the eastern side.

By the 1650s some English settlers had begun living full-time on the western side of the river, probably near what is now Riverdale Street, across from the Chicopee River.

Early in that decade, Springfield had made a provision that any able-bodied man (and his work animals) could be required to work up to six eight-hour days on local roads (the barter economy equivalent of an infrastructure tax). In 1666, the west side residents complained about having to work on east side roads while their own were not well taken care of. After considerable dispute, it was determined that the men of the settlement would tend the roads on their own sides of the river.

=== Parish formation and growing independence ===
In many ways, the distinction between the church and the state in the early New England town form of government was fuzzy, though religious and secular meetings were held separately and generally led by different people.

For the early settlers of Springfield, attendance at both town meetings and weekly Congregational church services (often both held in the town "meeting house") in the early settlement were mandatory, and this was enforced by fines.

For several decades, West Side residents requested accommodation from the town in the form of a free ferry service to reach the Springfield meeting house on the east side of the river, but were refused by town meeting and even by arbitrators from Northampton and Hadley. In March 1683, Reice Bedortha, his son John, John's wife Lydia, and their newborn Mercy, were drowned on the Connecticut on their way to church when their boat capsized. The west side residents renewed their complaints and began to demand their own church meeting house. On 29 May 1697, the Massachusetts General Court finally approved a separate parish and meeting house for the approximately 200 residents.

West side parishes were also created for Agawam (1696), Feeding Hills (1800), and Holyoke ("North Parish" or "Ireland Parish" named for early Irish settlers John and Mary Riley; 1786).

The Massachusetts Bay Colony passed a law in 1647 requiring the construction of a public school in any town with 50 or more families. In 1706 after two years of petitioning, west side residents were granted funds for the construction of a school (though west side students might have been home-schooled before that time).

In 1707, the west side parish was delegated from Springfield town meeting the right to grant land in its territory.

=== Independence from Springfield ===
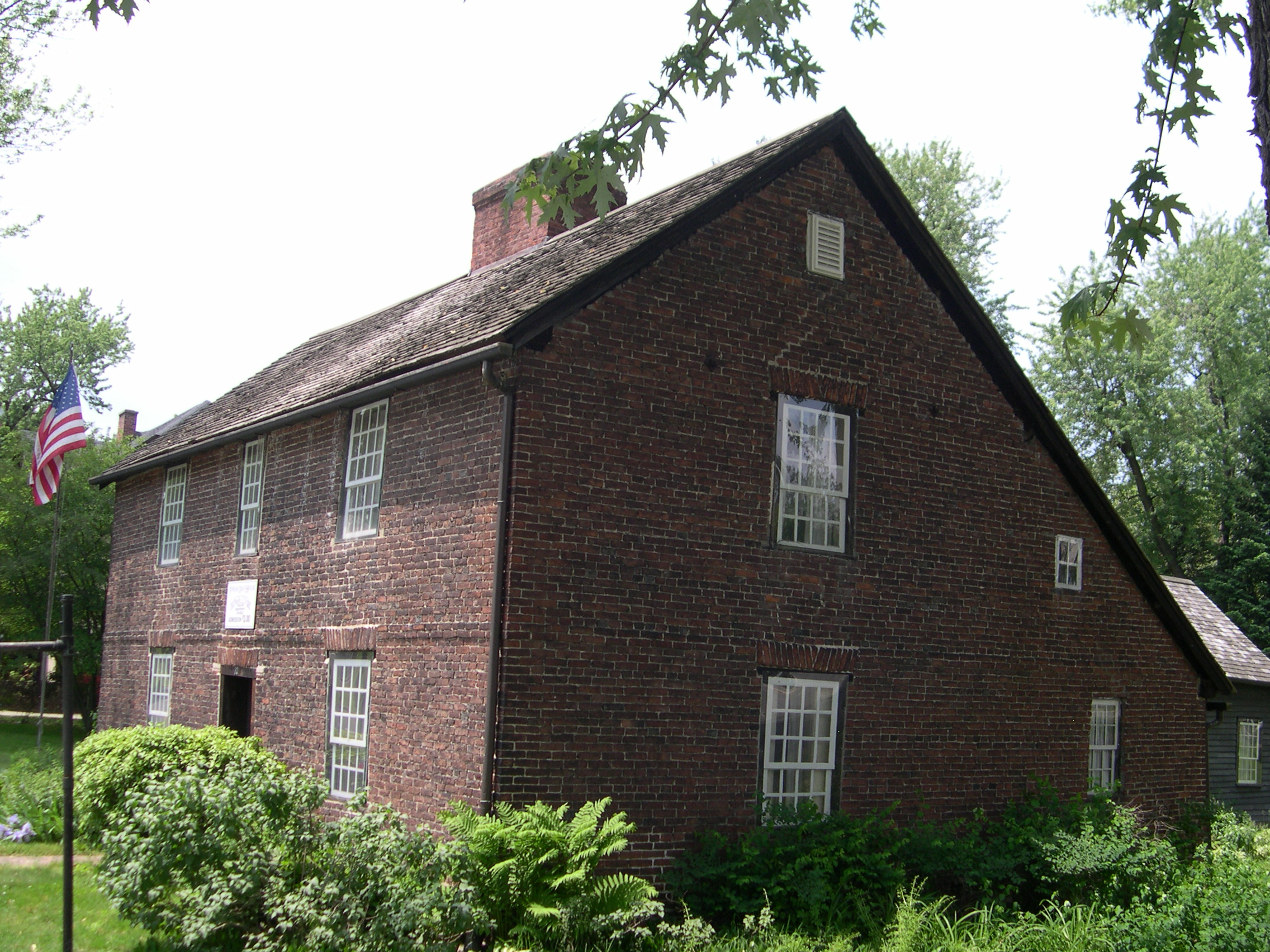
The Josiah Day House, built c. 1754, it is believed to be the oldest saltbox house made of brick in the United States; today tours are given by the Ramapogue Historical Society

Given the continuing need to cross the Connecticut River to attend town meetings, and east–west tension over resource allocation, the west side residents petitioned the Massachusetts General Court to be incorporated as a separate town in 1756. After a particularly contentious town meeting in 1773 which bounced between meeting houses on opposite shores and nearly resulted in a year-long government shutdown, proposals for partition were eventually sent from both sides to the colonial legislature. On 23 February 1774, West Springfield was incorporated as a separate town, with territory including what is now Agawam and most of Holyoke.

Another dispute was immediately created when the charter of the town prevented it from taxing the property of Springfield residents within its boundaries. This law was later changed to apply only until such property was sold, but the last such parcel did not become taxable by West Springfield until the 1860s.

=== American Revolution ===
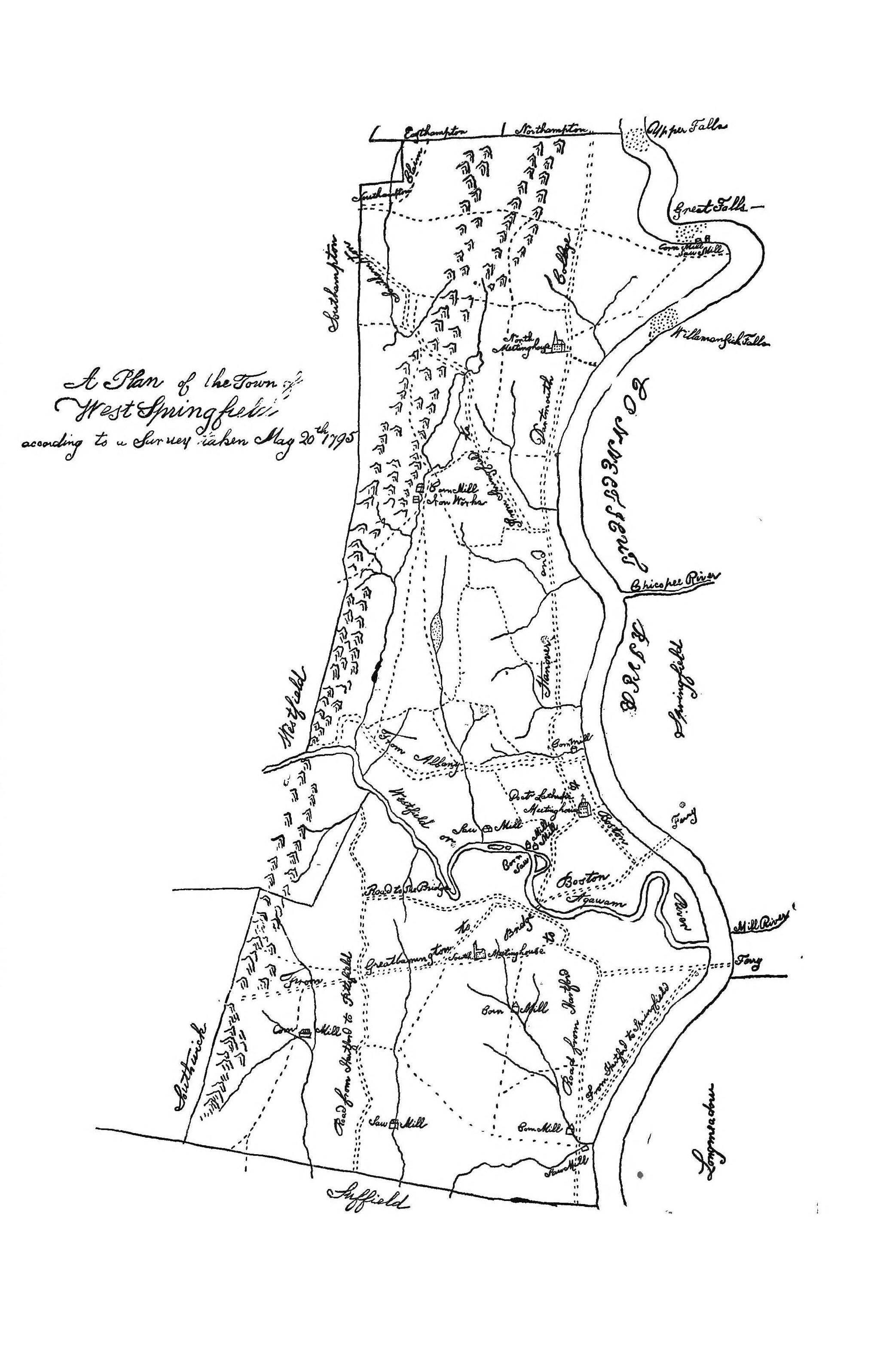
A map of West Springfield as surveyed in 1795, when it still included what are now Holyoke and Agawam.

West Springfield minutemen participated in the American Revolutionary War beginning on April 20, 1775, the day after the Battles of Lexington and Concord. In 1777, a major contingent of Hessian and British troops were captured at the Battle of Saratoga and transported to Boston (for possible deportation or imprisonment). While encamped in West Springfield, some of the German mercenaries stayed and married into the local population.

Economic conditions after the Revolution led to Shays' Rebellion in Springfield and West Springfield in 1786–1787.

=== Bridges ===
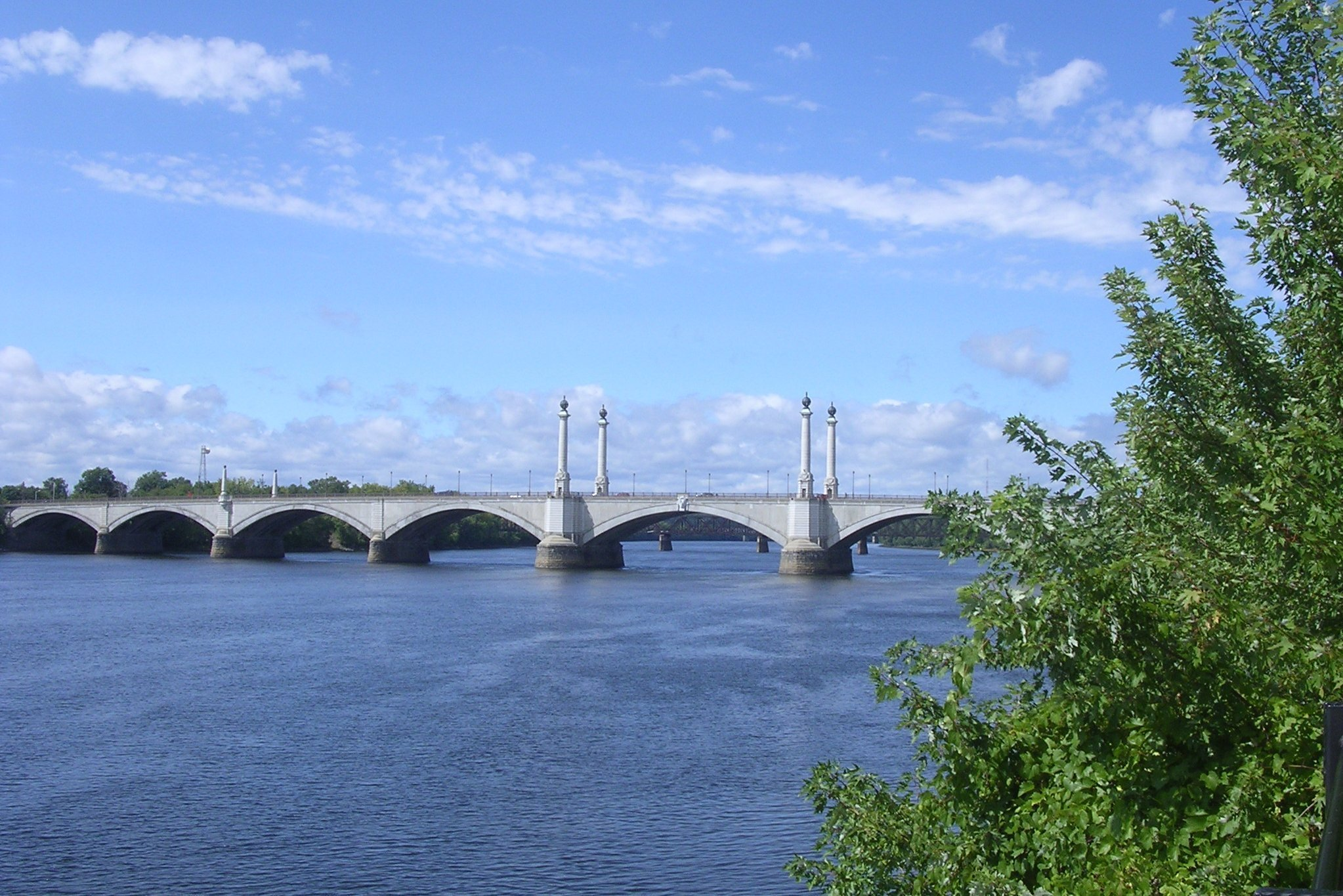
The Hampden County Memorial Bridge, linking West Springfield to Metro Center in Springfield

Technological advancements allowed the first bridge to be built across the Connecticut River in 1805. It was a toll bridge built on stone pilings; the roadway heaved up and down as it passed over six arch-shaped spans. This bridge was damaged by spring floods in 1814, and after a partial collapse under heavy traffic, was demolished.

In 1816, a replacement bridge opened at Bridge Street. It was destroyed in 1818 by spring ice, despite a valiant attempt to keep it from being washed downstream by tying it to a tree; the cable snapped. A third bridge built on the same foundations, was in use for over 100 years, and known as the "Old Toll Bridge", though tolls were removed in 1873.

The modern Memorial Bridge was opened in 1922; it underwent a major overhaul in the 1990s.

The first North End Bridge opened 1887 with a sturdy metal box-shaped truss (the upper part of the box being suspended above the roadway). In 1923, the tar-sealed wooden decking caught fire, which was made worse by the gas mains the bridge carried. The replacement bridge at this location is still in use.

Old county records indicate a license was given to Benjamin Ashley of West Springfield to operate a ferry across the Connecticut River in 1843, in the Riverdale neighborhood at what are now Ashley Avenue and Ferry Street. A wooden toll bridge was built on this site (at the base of Wayside Avenue—formerly Bridge Street—and Ashley Avenue) in 1847, but burned down in 1903. It was evidently replaced, as the state closed a bridge to Chicopee on this site in 1972, and demolished it in 1987.

Several crossings of the Westfield River were built in the 19th century, but most were destroyed by floods. Several highway bridges were also constructed in the late 20th century.

=== Natural disasters ===
The warnings of the Agawam Indians proved true in 1647, 1767, 1801, 1804, and 1818. Civil War-era dikes held back high water in the Agawam (Westfield) River in 1878, but heavy rain flooded the town again in 1927. Both heavy rains and a large snowmelt brought an even more massive flood in 1936, with 8,000 people were displaced in the town of 17,000. The area's bridges survived; the railroad bridge being weighed down by a fully loaded freight train intentionally parked across it. The New England Hurricane of 1938 flooded crops along Riverdale Road and severely damaged the Exposition grounds, causing the fair to close for the season. It also opened a hole in the dike at Mosley Avenue, which was repaired before the rain waters could once again flood the lower section of town. Yet another major flood struck in 1955 from Hurricane Connie and Hurricane Diane arriving five days apart, knocking out the town's drinking water facilities in Southwick and destroying Bear Hole Dam, Piper Reservoir, and Memorial Pool (all of which were rebuilt).

Winter weather has also caused significant damage at times during West Springfield's history. The Great Blizzard of 1888 dropped over 5 feet (1.5 m) of snow, with 20-foot (6.1 m) drifts. There have also been more recent blizzards in 1978 and 1996.

On June 1, 2011, a tornado touched down in West Springfield, crossed the Connecticut River, and then devastated the City of Springfield, Massachusetts. It damaged densely populated parts of West Springfield, causing two fatalities in the city—including a mother who died while shielding her 15-year-old daughter. U.S. President Barack Obama declared the area surrounding West Springfield and Springfield a federal disaster area.

On October 29, 2011, the "Halloween Nor'eastern" snow storm dumped more than ten inches of wet snow on the town and the surrounding area. Snow clung to trees which still had most of their leaves. The result was the falling of trees and limbs on homes, vehicles, powerlines and roadways. It took more than one week for some homes to have power restored.

=== Agriculture ===
The Eastern States Farmers' Exchange, known today for The Big E, was founded in 1918, and merged with other cooperatives to form Agway in 1964. Its former headquarters now serves as West Springfield Town Hall.

Agriculture continued to dominate the local economy when market gardening started in the 1830s, concentrating in the Riverdale Road area. These crops were intended to be sent to market for cash, rather than to be used by the farming family for themselves or to barter for other crops. Growing population and improved transportation links increased the size of the potential market; by 1860, West Springfield was using greenhouses and exporting fresh crops to Boston. Agriculture remained an important part of the West Springfield economy for many decades, but land development and economic changes led to a decline, and by the 1940s, it was a minor activity in the town.

The Eastern States Exposition started in 1917 as a reaction against the slow decline of New England agriculture. The annual fall fair is by far West Springfield's largest tourist attraction and one of the largest fairs in the country. The exposition grounds host many events on a year-round basis.

The first Morgan horse was bred in West Springfield in 1789–1790.

=== Railroads and industrialization ===
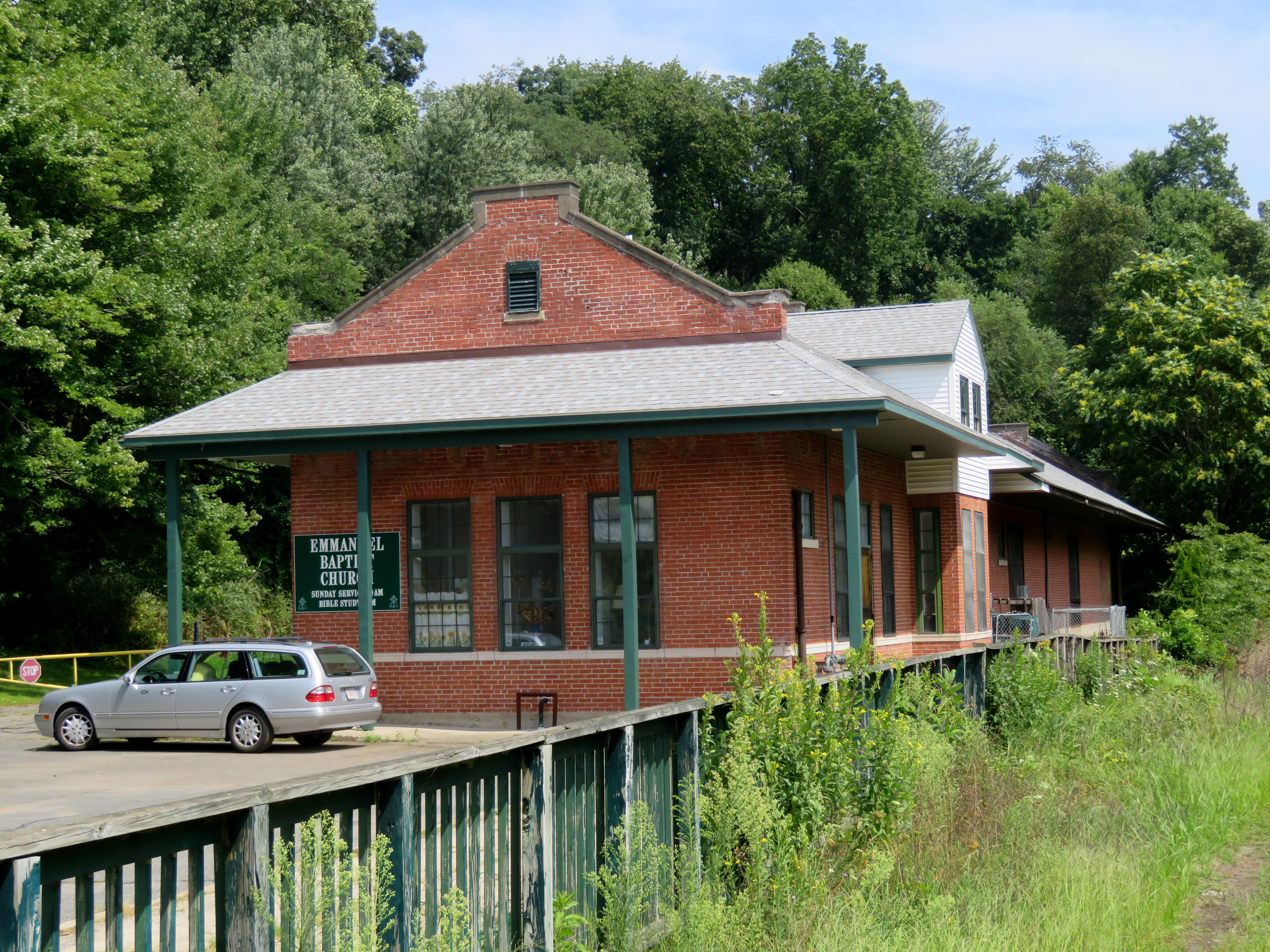
The former Mittineague station, built during the expansion of West Springfield's industrial base, today serves as a local church congregation

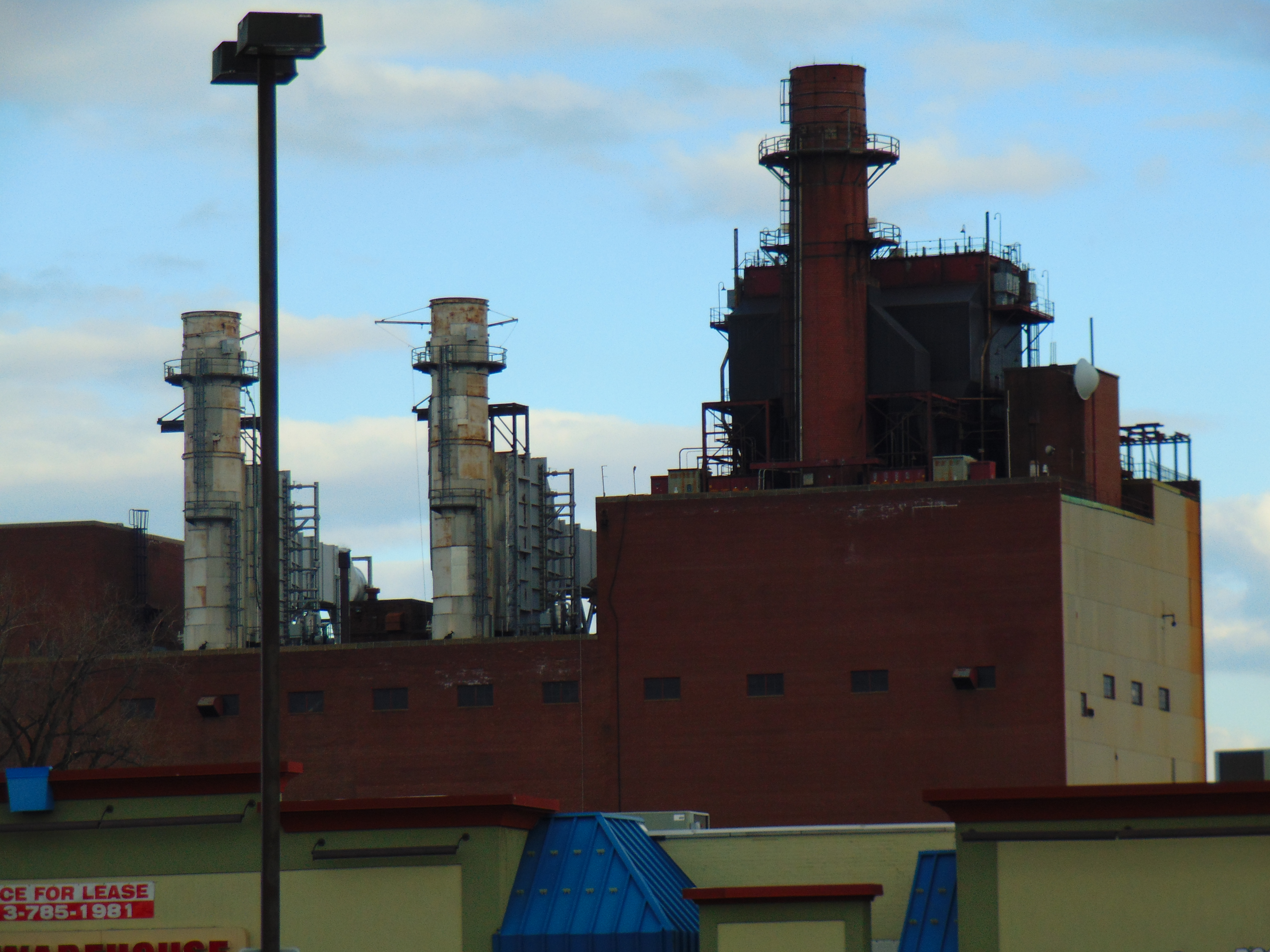
The West Springfield Generating Station, a peaking unit utility

Light manufacturing began to grow in the 19th century, including tanned hides, horse carriages, gunpowder, ceramics, industrial pipes, hats, and boats.

When the Industrial Revolution reached Western Massachusetts in the 19th century, the region's many fast-moving rivers resulted in a mill town boom. Early textile and paper mills were staffed by Irish famine immigrants who nearly doubled their population in the town between 1840 and 1860. Paper manufacturing became a major regional industry, including within the town limits included (mostly clustered on the Westfield River) the Southworth Paper Company (1839), the Agawam Paper Company (1859), the Agawam Canal Company, the Springfield Glazed Paper Company (1882), the Worthy Paper Company (1892), the Mittineague Paper Company (1892, later known as the Strathmore Paper Company and acquired by International Paper)

The Western Railroad opened for freight and passenger service in 1841, connecting West Springfield to Worcester, Boston, the Berkshires, and upstate New York. It would become the Boston and Albany Railroad in 1870. Travel time from Boston to Albany was considerably reduced from the over 40 hours it took by stagecoach in the 1820s. The covered wooden railroad bridge across the Connecticut which opened in 1841, was replaced by the current double-track steel truss railroad bridge in 1874.

West Springfield became a major transportation hub, and the railroad became one of the largest employers in the town for many decades. Repair shops were also built in West Springfield in 1896, and at the peak of operations, there were two major rail yards—one in Mittineague, and one near the present-day Memorial Avenue.

The original horsecar trolley, operated by the Springfield Street Railway, opened in 1877 from Main Street in Springfield to Elm and Park Streets, via Main Street and the old toll bridge at Bridge Street. It was later extended via Westfield Street to (Upper) Church Street. Electrification was completed in 1892–1893, and the river crossing was moved to the original North End Bridge. Over the years, extensions were made to the Holyoke Street Railway (via Riverdale Road, 1895), Tatham (1896) the Woronoco Street Railway (in Westfield, 1899), the Connecticut border via Riverside Park (now Six Flags New England) in Agawam (1900), Feeding Hills (1902), and eventually the Suffield Street Railway in Connecticut (making the Hartford-West Side Line possible, 1905).

The destruction of the old North End Bridge in 1923 saw relocation of the trolley crossing to the modern Memorial Bridge. But trolley passenger service was cut starting in 1924 and by 1936, eliminated. Present-day local and intercity mass transit is provided by Pioneer Valley Transit Authority bus routes, Amtrak, and private bus carriers. Peter Pan Bus Lines is headquartered in Springfield.

Conversion from steam to diesel locomotives shut down the West Springfield repair shop in 1956. With the rise of the automobile, the West Springfield (Mittineague) passenger railroad station closed in 1957. Amtrak service is still available to Springfield, and the central rail yard is still in active use for freight by CSX, the present-day successor of this part of the Boston & Albany.

Rural Free Delivery started delivering postal mail to residents' homes in the late 19th or early 20th century.

A major power plant for the Western Massachusetts Electric Company (now a subsidiary of Northeast Utilities) went online in West Springfield in 1949.

=== Creation of Holyoke and Agawam ===
Even more substantial canal and mill development took place in the "North Parish" or "Ireland Parish" of West Springfield, which was favorably located near Hadley Falls. The parish was incorporated as the independent town of Holyoke, Massachusetts, in 1850.

The area mainly south of the Westfield River, including the parishes of Agawam and Feeding Hills, was incorporated as the independent town of Agawam, Massachusetts, in 1855.

=== Highway construction ===
U.S. Route 5 (currently, also known as Riverdale Street) was modified to bypass the downtowns of Springfield and West Springfield as new segments were constructed on the West Springfield and Agawam waterfronts in 1938, 1941–1942, and 1952–1953. This resulted in some land takings and cutting off certain neighborhoods from the river, but north–south travel was speeded, and the dike system was reinforced to prevent the flooding of these neighborhoods. The approaches to the North End and Memorial Bridges were modified to accommodate the new traffic patterns.

The Massachusetts Turnpike was constructed from 1955 to 1957. Interstate 91 was constructed over a dozen years, from 1958 to 1970, following considerable controversy over whether it should be placed in West Springfield, as originally planned, or in Springfield, as that city's planners wished.

==== Interstate 91 planned for West Springfield ====
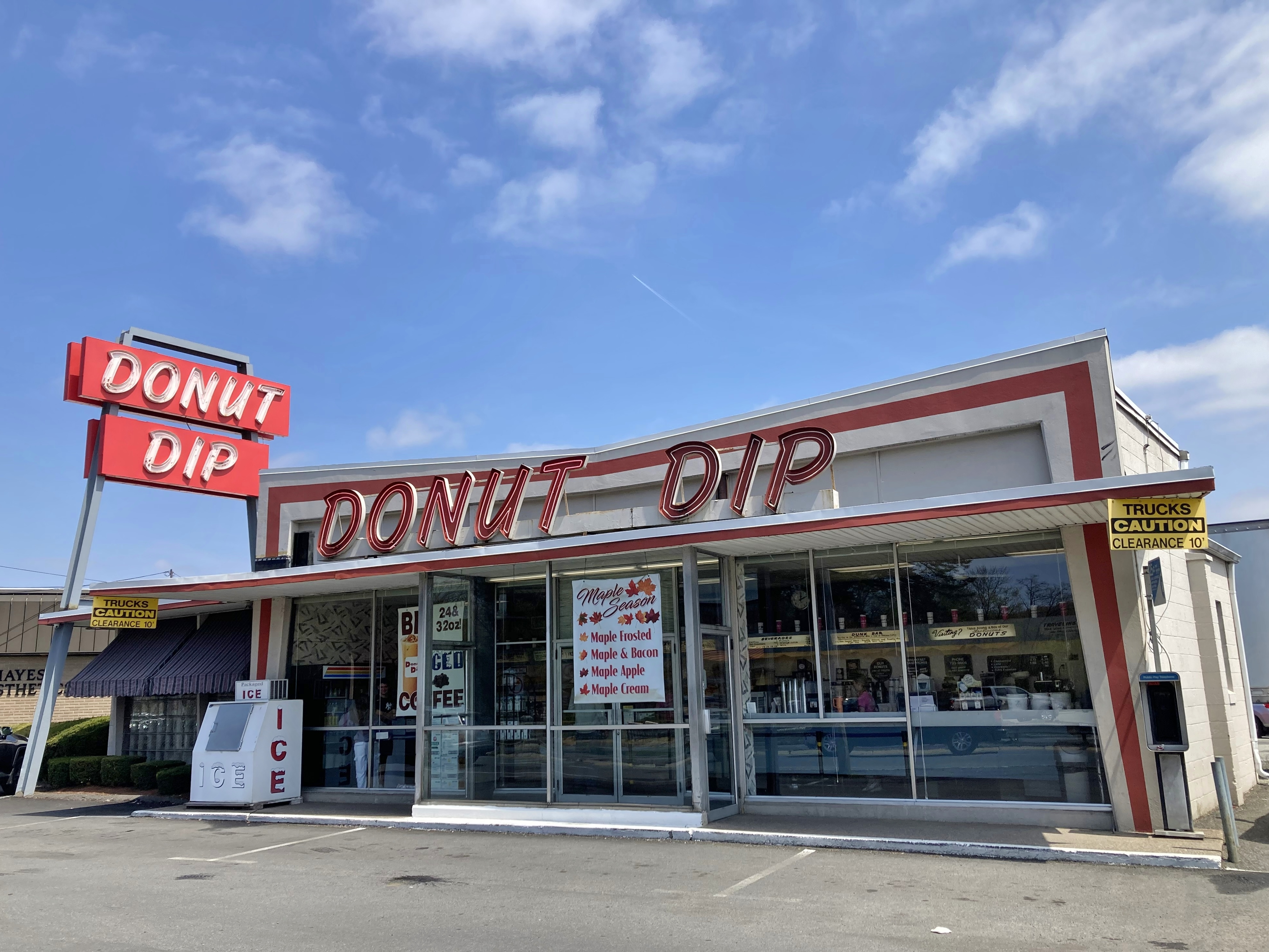
Donut Dip has survived and thrived at its Route 5 (Riverdale Street) location since 1957

The original plan for Interstate 91—detailed in the 1953 Master Highway Plan for the Springfield, Massachusetts, Metropolitan Area—called for Interstate 91 to occupy an enlarged U.S. Route 5 in West Springfield—the route which had, historically, been used to reach West Springfield and Springfield from both the north and the south. Between 1953 and 1958, Riverdale Road was widened in places, added on to, and numerous businesses were closed and moved back, or to other parts of West Springfield to make way for Interstate 91, which was planned to connect with Springfield via numerous bridges. The original plan for I-91 would have likely benefitted West Springfield, which already had U.S. 5 passing through, causing travelers to patronize many of West Springfield's businesses.

In 1958, however, Springfield's city planners campaigned vociferously for Interstate 91 to occupy Springfield's riverfront. Their reasoning at the time was that Springfield, being a more populous city than West Springfield, should have a major highway routed through it. Indeed, Springfield's 1958 city planners advocated that the construction of I-91 on Springfield's riverfront would catalyze economic growth comparable to that experienced during the great railroad expansion of the mid-19th century.

Massachusetts highway officials decided to route the highway on the Springfield side, finding that a short existing section of US 5 through West Springfield that was built in 1952–1953 failed to meet Interstate design standards. On the east bank of the river, Springfield got an elevated highway, as opposed to the planned ground-level highway in West Springfield.

After Interstate 91 was constructed in Springfield, that city did not experience anything like the prosperity boom predicted by its city planners in 1958. I-91's construction in Springfield coincided with the beginning of that city's four decades of decline. Unlike West Springfield's U.S. 5, Springfield's I-91 was constructed in an area where there had never been highway traffic or businesses that catered to such traffic. Due to I-91's proximity to both Springfield's densely built downtown and the city's riverfront, there has never been enough space in Springfield to build more than a few of these businesses. Thus Springfield never received the economic benefit that West Springfield would have, according to a 2009 assessment by the UMass School of Urban Design.

== Geography ==
According to the United States Census Bureau, the city has a total area of 17.5 square miles (45.4 km^{2}), of which 16.8 square miles (43.4 km^{2}) is land and 0.8 square mile (2.0 km^{2}) (4.50%) is water. It is on the west side of the Connecticut River, across from Springfield, and on the north side of the Westfield River, above Agawam.

West Springfield is bordered on the west by linear cliffs of volcanic trap rock known as East Mountain. They are part of the Metacomet Ridge, a mountainous trap rock ridgeline that stretches from Long Island Sound to nearly the Vermont border. Both are traversed by the 110-mile (180 km) Metacomet-Monadnock Trail.

West Springfield is located 27 miles (43 km) away from Hartford, 90 miles (140 km) away from Boston, 85 miles (137 km) from Albany, 48 miles (77 km) away from Pittsfield, 139 miles (224 km) from New York City and 6 miles (9.7 km) miles from Six Flags.

Other major geographical features include:

- Bagg Brook
- Block Brook (named after a distinctive bridge on what is now Westfield Street)
- Bear Hole – an approximately 1,700-acre (6.9 km^{2}) wooded area that includes Bear Hole Reservoir. The reservoir, which is very shallow, supplies a minimal amount of the town's drinking water. The area supports a diversified biological environment; including Great Horned Owl, White Tailed Deer, hawk as well as vernal pools. Hiking, dog walking and nature watching are popular activities year round. The Pioneer Valley Railroad has a railway established along the westernmost perimeter. This is a very low speed railway that hauls primarily commercial freight to local businesses. In 2021, the Massachusetts Audubon Society and the Massachusetts Department of Conservation and Recreation purchased a permanent conservation easement for the property (which extends into Holyoke) from the Town of West Springfield, which owns the land for drinking water protection purposes. The origin of the name is unclear; the first known written reference is a deed showing ownership by Rufus S. Payne in 1838. From 1890 to 1906 it was home to the Bear Hole Resort, including a restaurant and a bear in a cage.
- Crowfoot Brook
- Goldine Brook
- Mittineague Park
- Pawcatuck Brook – from morphemes in local Indian language: pauqua – clear, transparent, or pegwa – shallow; tuck – river
- Piper Brook
- Town Common – Formerly used for the town meeting house, church, and militia, the current tree-lined park was laid out in 1866 by Edward Parsons and other townspeople. The surrounding streets were at this time renamed from "Broadway" to "Park Street" and "Park Avenue".
- White Church Hill – The church which still remains there replaced the Old Meeting House (which was on the Common) as the town's main church and meeting hall in 1802. It was supplemented by a second congregational church, again on the common, in 1872.
- Schoolhouse Brook
- Tannery Brook

== Neighborhoods ==
- Amostown, West Springfield - Named for Amos Taylor, a settler in the 18th century
- Ashleyville, West Springfield - Named after the Ashley family and located near Interstate 91 and Riverdale Street
- Cayenne, West Springfield - Named by resident Russell H. Pepper, as a parody of his own name and located near Morgan Road and Riverdale Street
- Downtown West Springfield - Area surrounding Elm St, Park St, and Van Deene Ave. Also known as Center.
- Memorial, West Springfield - Area closest to Memorial Ave and the Big E
- Merrick, West Springfield - Named after the Merrick family, prominent land owners in the most densely settled part of town.
- Mittineague - An Indian name for the same place, and located on the north bank of the Westfield River
- Paucatuck, West Springfield (archaic) - area near Paucatuck Brook, west of Tatham
- Tatham, West Springfield (Tawtum, Tattom) - An Indian name for the same place, located northwest and west of Mittineague
- Ramapogue, West Springfield (archaic) - the area west of the Common and east of the hills

== Transportation ==
=== Roads ===
Numbered routes passing through the town include:

- Interstate 91 (perpendicular to Route 5 after crossing from Springfield, through the northeast quadrant of town)
- Massachusetts Turnpike (I-90)
- U.S. Route 5 (Riverdale Street)
- U.S. Route 20 (Westfield Street and downtown)
- Massachusetts Route 147 (Memorial Avenue)

=== Airport ===
There are no airports in West Springfield, the nearest airport with commercial passenger flights is Bradley International Airport in Windsor Locks, Connecticut. The nearest general aviation airports are Westover Metropolitan Airport in Chicopee, and Westfield-Barnes Regional Airport, and there are helipads in Agawam and Springfield.

=== Transit ===
As for transportation, several bus lines on the Pioneer Valley Transit Authority bus system service West Springfield from routes crossing over from Springfield:

- Red 14 – Feeding Hills/Springfield
- Red 10 – West Springfield/Westfield State University
- Purple 20 – Holyoke/Springfield via Holyoke Mall – Riverdale
- Red 24 – Essex/Appleton via Cabot/Sargent/Holyoke Hospital (Saturday only)

== Demographics ==
As of the census of 2010, there were 28,391 people, 11,757 households, and 7,117 families residing in the city. The population density was 1,665.7 inhabitants per square mile (643.1/km^{2}). There were 12,259 housing units at an average density of 731.9 per square mile (282.6/km^{2}). The racial makeup of the city was 90.68% White, 3.30% African American, 0.22% Native American, 1.97% Asian, 0.04% Pacific Islander, 2.94% from other races, and 2.10% from two or more races. 5.75% of the population were Hispanic or Latino of any race.

There were 11,823 households, out of which 27.0% had children under the age of 18 living with them, 44.7% were married couples living together, 11.4% had a female householder with no husband present, and 39.8% were non-families. 34.0% of all households were made up of individuals, and 11.2% had someone living alone who was 65 years of age or older. The average household size was 2.33 and the average family size was 3.02.

In the city, the population was spread out, with 23.4% under the age of 18, 7.8% from 18 to 24, 29.6% from 25 to 44, 23.2% from 45 to 64, and 15.9% who were 65 years of age or older. The median age was 38 years. For every 100 females, there were 95.2 males. For every 100 females age 18 and over, there were 91.2 males.

Historical population
Year	Pop.	±%
1790	2,367	—
1840	3,626	+53.2%
1850	2,979	−17.8%
1860	2,105	−29.3%
1870	2,606	+23.8%
1880	4,149	+59.2%
1890	5,077	+22.4%
1900	7,105	+39.9%
1910	9,224	+29.8%
1920	13,443	+45.7%
1930	16,684	+24.1%
1940	17,135	+2.7%
1950	20,438	+19.3%
1960	24,924	+21.9%
1970	28,461	+14.2%
1980	27,042	−5.0%
1990	27,537	+1.8%
2000	27,899	+1.3%
2010	28,391	+1.8%
2020	28,835	+1.6%
2024*	29,028	+0.7%
* = population estimate. Source: United States census records and Population Estimates Program data. Source: U.S. Decennial Census

The median income for a household in the city was $40,266, and the median income for a family was $50,282. Males had a median income of $38,082 versus $28,079 for females. The per capita income for the city was $20,982. About 8.7% of families and 11.9% of the population were below the poverty line, including 20.0% of those under age 18 and 7.3% of those age 65 or over.

Population table source: Populations for 1800, 1810, and 1830 were not available online from this source.

== Government ==
West Springfield was originally governed by an open town meeting, and then a representative town meeting starting in 1922. The town meetings were presided over by the town moderator. The city is now governed by a mayor and town council starting on April 1, 2000. West Springfield is one of thirteen Massachusetts municipalities that have applied for, and been granted, city forms of government but wish to retain "The town of" in their official names. The first mayor who held office was Edward Gibson, an independent, who stayed in office for five consecutive terms. Republican Greg Neffinger, was elected mayor on November 8, 2011, but lost his bid for re-election to Republican Edward C Sullivan in 2013. The current mayor, Independent Will Reichelt was elected to his first term in 2015. He was re-elected in 2017, and won a third term in 2021 and a fourth term in 2025.

=== Voter party enrollment ===
Voter registration and party enrollment as of February 1, 2025
Party	Number of Voters	Percentage
Democratic	4,024	19.93%
Republican	2,392	11.85%
Unaffiliated	13,570	67.20%
Other parties	208	1.03%
Total	20,194	100%

== Town services ==
West Springfield has its own school district, police department, fire department, library, department of public works, health department, and department of parks and recreation.

West Springfield Fire Department was created in 1883 and currently has 11 apparatus serving out of three fire halls.

The school district has controlled by an independent school committee since 1827 and maintains a central high school, middle school, and a number of elementary schools.

The first town funds budgeted for police enforcement were in 1877; the force has gradually become professionalized, motorized, and equipped with and dedicated offices and jail facilities.

The Department of Public Works provides water utility service to the town, drawing from four wells in the Great Brook section of Barne's Aquifer, in Southwick. The Bear Hole Reservoir and Bear Hole Water Treatment Plant are no longer used. The well-water treatment plant (at 506 Shaker Road, Westfield, on the Southwick border) uses 240,000 pounds of granular activated carbon to filter PFAS and the pesticides ethylene dibromide and dichloropropane from the well water. The pesticides were used on nearby fields (currently used for tobacco and hay). The city also has two interconnections (on Piper Road and Rogers Ave) with the Springfield Water and Sewer Commission for a backup supply, fed from Cobble Mountain Reservoir via a treatment facility in Westfield. West Springfield water tanks are located at 537 Rogers Ave, at the end of Goldenview Drive, and on Prospect Hill near 733 Bernie Ave.

=== Library ===
Semi-public "subscription" libraries operated from 1775 to 1807 and 1810–1840. The current collection began in 1854, but was later made free to the public. The West Springfield Public Library was established in 1864. It moved from the town hall to a dedicated building in 1915, constructed with a donation from Andrew Carnegie. An addition was opened in 1959. In fiscal year 2008, the city of West Springfield spent 0.91% ($765,760) of its budget on its public library—approximately $27 per person, per year ($35.58 adjusted for inflation to 2022).

== Education ==
The West Springfield Public Schools district operates nine schools. The town also has a charter school, a Catholic school, and two schools for special education. The town's public school athletic teams are called the "Terriers".

=== Public district schools ===
- Cowing School (preschool and other students who are not able to attend regular school)
- John Ashley School (PreK-K)
- Phillip G. Coburn Elementary (K-5)
- John R. Fausey Elementary (1-5)
- Memorial Elementary (1-5)
- Mittineague Elementary (1-5)
- Tatham Elementary (K-5)
- West Springfield Middle School (6-8)
- West Springfield High School (9-12)

=== Other schools ===
- Lower Pioneer Valley Educational Collaborative (special education, jointly operated with neighboring school districts)
- St. Thomas the Apostle (K-8) - Catholic school
- Hampden Charter School of Science West (6-11)
- May Center School for Autism and Developmental Disabilities (private)

=== School buildings and closings ===
Coburn Elementary School was built in 1923–1924 as West Springfield Junior High School and added to in 1928–1929, operating as a grade 7–8 junior high school. Cowing School was opened as the town's first stand-alone high school in 1915, and when the new high school on Piper Rd. opened in 1956 it became Cowing Junior High School, serving grades 7–8 as well. As West Springfield moved to the middle-school format, Coburn and Cowing assumed their current functions. Three elementary schools—John Ashley, Memorial, and Tatham—were opened in 1952 to accommodate the post-war baby boom. Additionally, John R. Fausey School was built in 1960 and added to in 1962. West Springfield High School was moved from the Cowing building in 1956 to Piper Road. A significant addition opened in 1966. A new West Springfield High School was built to the north of the old building and was opened in 2014. The old building was demolished. In 2019 modular buildings were added to Tatham Elementary because of increased enrollments and little space. The modulars currently hold 5th and 3rd grade classes. After the construction of the first high school on Piper Road, Cowing School was originally slated for demolition, but the new high school had been under-built for the surging student population, and 9th graders were moved to Cowing from 1960 until the high school addition opened in 1966. From 1966 to 1981, Cowing School served as a junior high school.

With the passage of the Proposition 2-1/2 referendum in 1980, the school budget was tightened, priorities were reexamined, and numerous schools were closed or consolidated in the fall of 1981.

- John Ashley School closed but reopened in 1987, due to increased district enrollment, as the town-wide center for kindergarten and early childhood classes.
- Main Street School closed and was repurposed as apartments.
- Park Avenue School closed and was repurposed as an office building.
- Old Tatham School closed and was repurposed as apartments.
- Margaret C. McDonough (formerly Kings Highway) School closed and was repurposed as apartments.
- William A. Cowing Junior High School (formerly the High School from 1915 to 1956) was designated an elementary school.

Before the opening of West Springfield Middle School in 1998, the town struggled with increased enrollment.

- In 1987, John Ashley School welcomed the future class of 2000, consolidating all kindergartens in one building along with the early childhood program.
- In 1990, Piper Road School opened in a wing of the high school, housing all the town's 6th graders, and creating the grade 1–5 elementary school structure that remains in most buildings. With the opening of the middle school, this space reverted to the high school.

West Springfield Middle School opened in 1998 for grades 6–8.

- West Springfield Junior High School was designated an elementary school and named the Philip G. Coburn School in memory of a well-loved townsman who was a former educator and longtime editor of the West Springfield Record.
- William A. Cowing Elementary School was closed and sections of the building were used for different educational purposes until the district adopted full-day kindergarten and early childhood (Pre-K) students were assigned to Cowing School.
- In 2014, a new West Springfield High School was built and the 1956 building was demolished .
- In 2019, modular buildings were added to Tatham Elementary to increase space. The buildings are used as fifth and third grade classrooms.

== Economy ==
West Springfield is considered to be part of the Springfield-Hartford Knowledge Corridor.

With easy access to the north–south Interstate 91, east–west Massachusetts Turnpike, and various freight railroads, West Springfield is sometimes called the "crossroads of New England".

The Riverdale Road corridor is a major regional shopping center, with a number of "big box" retail stores and car dealerships.

The Eastern States Exposition is a major seasonal employer.

== Tourist attractions ==
- The Josiah Day House, which is believed to be the oldest known brick saltbox style house in the United States.
- The Eastern States Exposition (the "Big E"), a large annual fair
- The 110-mile (180 km) Metacomet-Monadnock Trail (a hiking trail) passes through the western part of West Springfield on the East Mountain and Provin Mountain ridgeline.

There are only a few parks in the city:

- Mittineague Park
- Veterans Field – football field and two baseball diamonds
- Cook's Park
- Town Common between Park Street & Park Ave from Elm to Main Streets
- Ohio Field
- Old Tatham Field
- New Tatham Field
- Clark Field
- Main Street Park

== Media ==
There is only one local newspaper, the weekly (every Thursday) town newspaper West Springfield Record was founded in 1953 with circulation about 5,500. All other print media are regional papers such as the Republican of Springfield. Television and radio service originates from other cities outside of West Springfield.

West Springfield is one of the two cities (along with Portland, Oregon), that inspired The Simpsons’ hometown of Springfield, though the name is based on Springfield, Oregon.

ABC's short-lived 2004–2005 sitcom Complete Savages used West Springfield as its setting.

== Sports ==
West Springfield was the longtime home of the Springfield Indians from 1926 to 1972 with some spurts in between including the 1940s when the Eastern States Coliseum was used for war surplus during World War II. After the Springfield Civic Center was built downtown, the Indians relocated there for the 1972-73 AHL Season. The ice plant at the Coliseum was in use until 1990.

The Massachusetts Twisters of the American Indoor Soccer League played at the Coliseum as well.

== Notable people ==
- Angelo Bertelli, football player, first Heisman Trophy winner for Notre Dame
- Amo Bessone, coach, Michigan State hockey (1966 National Champion) and United States Hockey Hall of Fame inductee, 1992
- Peter Bessone, United States Hockey Hall of Fame inductee, 1978
- William Bourque, Canadian auto racer living in West Springfield; died during first AAA Championship race at Indianapolis Motor Speedway
- Chris Capuano, Major League Baseball pitcher
- Tim Daggett, gymnast, Olympic gold medalist
- Harry Dalton, MLB general manager
- Luke Day, Revolutionary War captain, leader of Shays' Rebellion
- Leo Durocher, Hall of Fame Major League Baseball player and manager
- Eugene Grazia, member of 1960 U.S. hockey gold medal team
- Horace A. Moses, founder of Strathmore (Mittineague) Paper Company (1892) and West Springfield Trust Company (1919), local philanthropist
- Joe Ragland, Turkish League professional basketball player
- Vic Raschi, Major League Baseball pitcher, six-time World Series champion
- Brian Scully, television writer and producer for The Simpsons and Family Guy
- Mike Scully, former co-producer of The Simpsons

== See also ==
- West Springfield Generating Station
