= Josiah Day House =

Historic house in Massachusetts, United States

- U.S. National Register of Historic Places
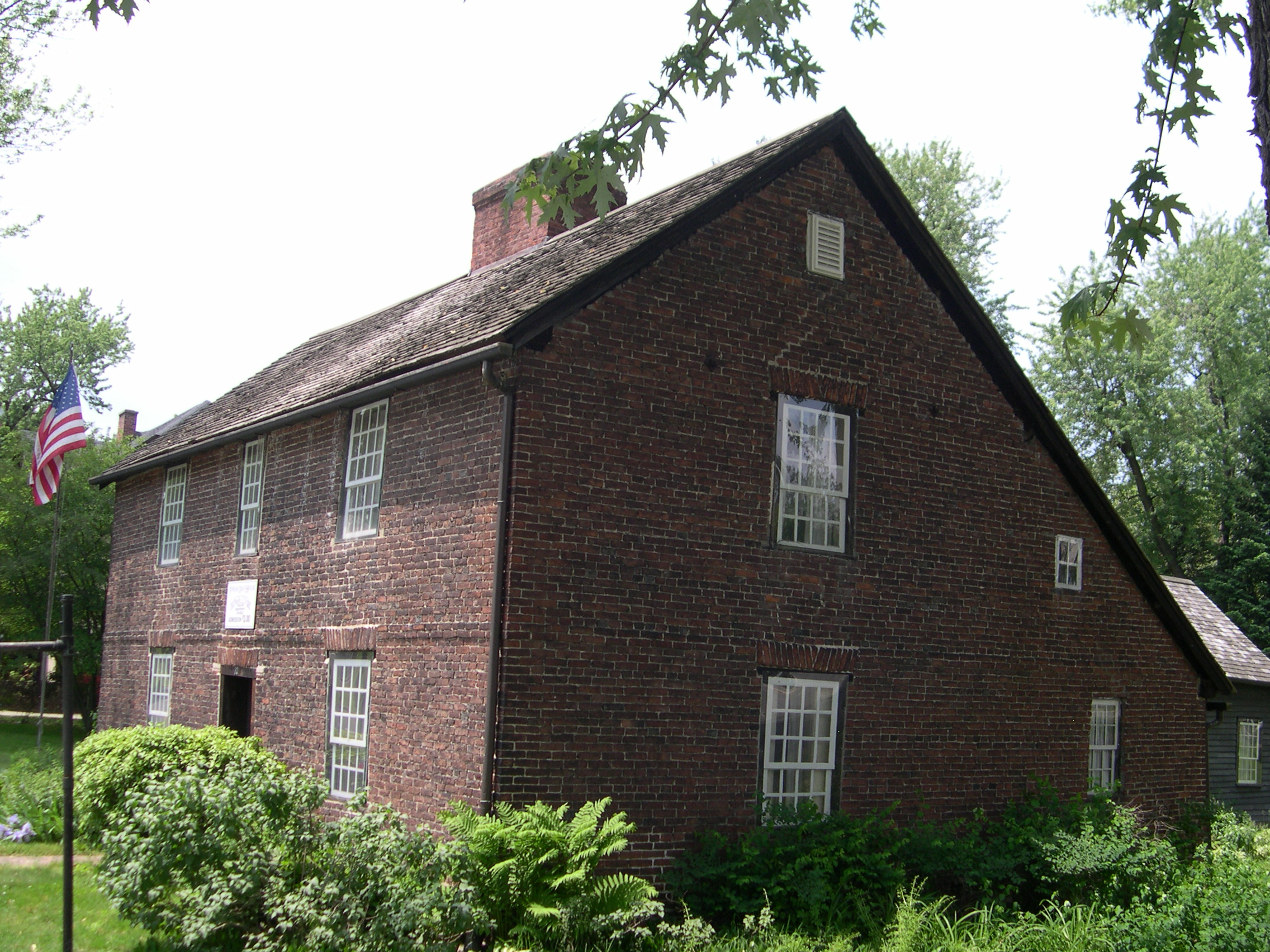
- Josiah Day House, West Springfield, Massachusetts
- Location: 70 Park St., West Springfield, Massachusetts
- Coordinates: 42°6′24.87″N 72°37′7.51″W
- Area: 1 acre (0.40 ha)
- Built: ca. 1754
- NRHP reference No.: 75000265
- Added to NRHP: April 16, 1975

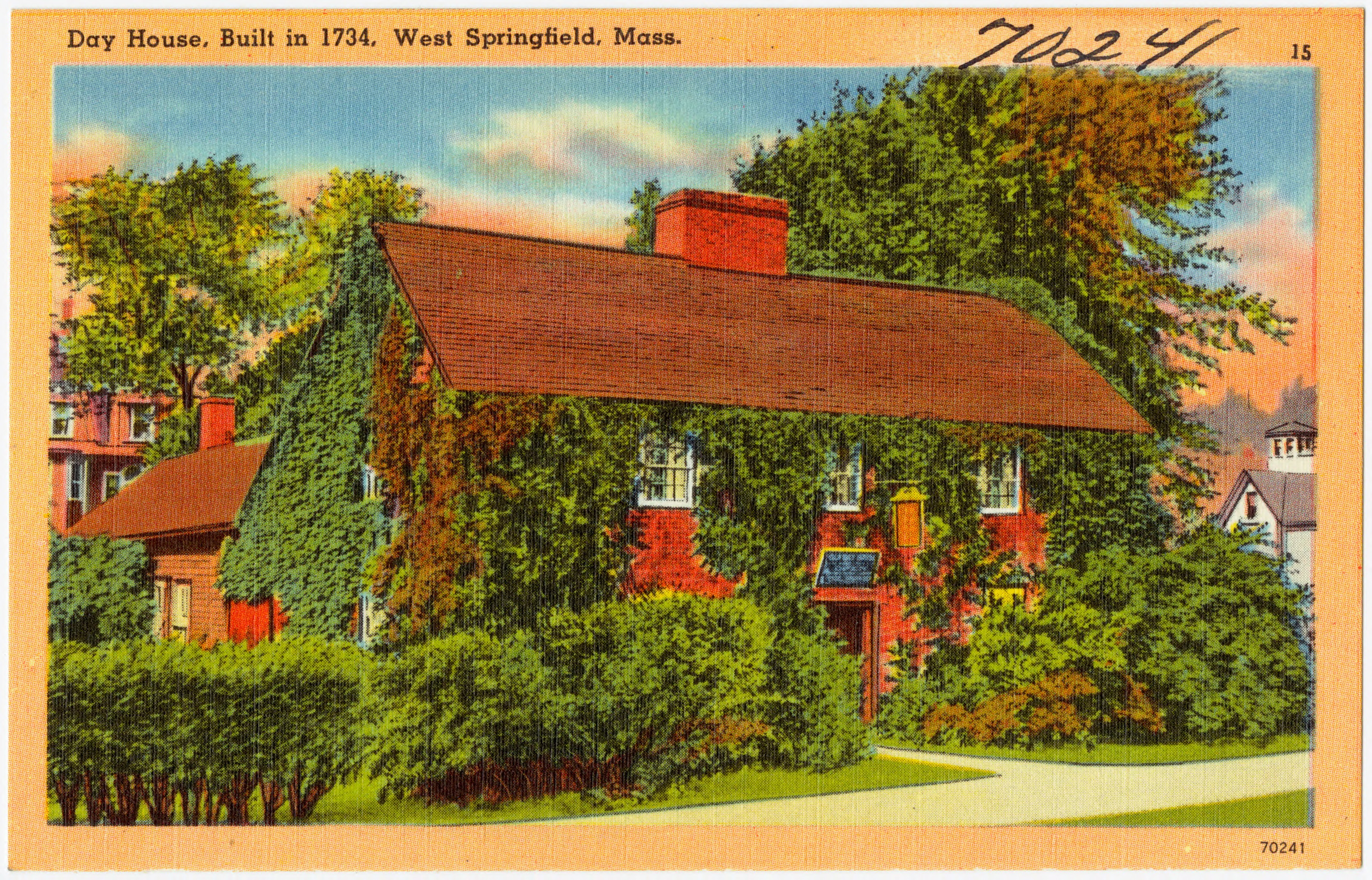
Historic postcard

The Josiah Day House is a historic house museum at 70 Park Street in West Springfield, Massachusetts, United States. Built about 1754, it is believed to be the oldest known brick saltbox style house in the United States. It was listed on the National Register of Historic Places in 1975. It is owned by the local historical society, and is occasionally open for guided tours.

== Description ==
The Josiah Day House stands on the north side of Park Street (United States Route 20), a busy parkway divided by the town common, not far from the Connecticut River. It is a 2 1/2-story brick building, set facing south toward the common. It has a side gable roof, which extends down to the first floor in the rear, giving the house its saltbox profile. A large chimney rises at the center of the house. The main facade is three bays wide, with the entry at the center. A single-story wood-frame ell extends to the rear of the house. The interior follows a typical Georgian central chimney plan, with parlors on either side of the chimney, and a large kitchen space behind it, with small chambers in the rear corners.

== History ==
Josiah Day bought the land at the current site of the house in 1746. By 1754, the house had been built and became the home of Josiah and his family. The house was passed down from generation to generation until the last of the Day House residents, Lydia Day, died in 1902. At that time, the remaining Day family members sold the house to the Ramapogue Historical Society.

While the main part of the house has remained in its original state, an addition was added to the back of the house in 1812, to accommodate Aaron Day II, the grandson of Josiah, and son of Aaron I. Aaron II and his family moved in with his parents and utilized the new wing.

Once the house was purchased by the Ramapogue Historical Society in 1903, it was preserved in its original state. Tours of the house are held on special town days or holidays. All artifacts in the house are time period appropriate, and include original Day family items, such as the high boy, writing desk, and other furnishings.

The house was listed on the National Register of Historic Places in 1975. It is the oldest brick building in Hampden County.

== See also ==
- Saltbox house
- List of historic houses in Massachusetts
- List of the oldest buildings in Massachusetts
- National Register of Historic Places listings in Hampden County, Massachusetts
