= Fay, Spofford & Thorndike =

Fay, Spofford & Thorndike (FST) was a privately held company that provided civil and transportation, structural, water/wastewater and building systems engineering services to a variety of public- and private-sector clients for more than 100 years. The firm ceased operating as an independent entity when Stantec, one of North America's largest engineering firms, acquired FST, on October 30, 2015.

== History ==
Fay, Spofford & Thorndike was founded in June 1914 by three engineers with ties to the Massachusetts Institute of Technology (MIT). Frederic H. Fay served on many boards and in numerous industry leadership roles, including as the national chairman of the American Institute of Consulting Engineers (AICE). This is the organization that spawned the American Council of Engineering Companies (ACEC). Charles M. Spofford was an MIT professor and the author of the work on modern structural engineering, The Theory of Structures. Sturgis M. Thorndike, who graduated with a BA from Harvard and a BS from MIT, left his position as Boston City Engineer to join Fay and Spofford in their new venture.

One of the firm's first projects was for the City of Fall River, Massachusetts. The resulting report issued in 1915, "Report of the Watuppa Ponds and Quequechan River Commission", advised the city how to rectify a serious pollution issue in its major waterways. This report has been recognized as an important document in the advancement of water pollution treatment and control. The National Center for Biotechnology Information features an article based on the report that appeared in the American Journal of Public Health.

== Notable projects ==
The bulk of FST's notable projects are in the Northeastern United States. These include the original Champlain Bridge (completed in 1929), the Memorial Bridge in Springfield, the Bourne Bridge and Sagamore Bridge over the Cape Cod Canal (completed in 1937), multiple projects for The Big Dig in Boston, and the Runway 33L End Safety Project at Logan Airport. At the time of the acquisition, FST was working on a study for a potential third road bridge over the Cape Cod Canal.
