= Memorial Bridge (Massachusetts) =

Hampden County Memorial Bridge
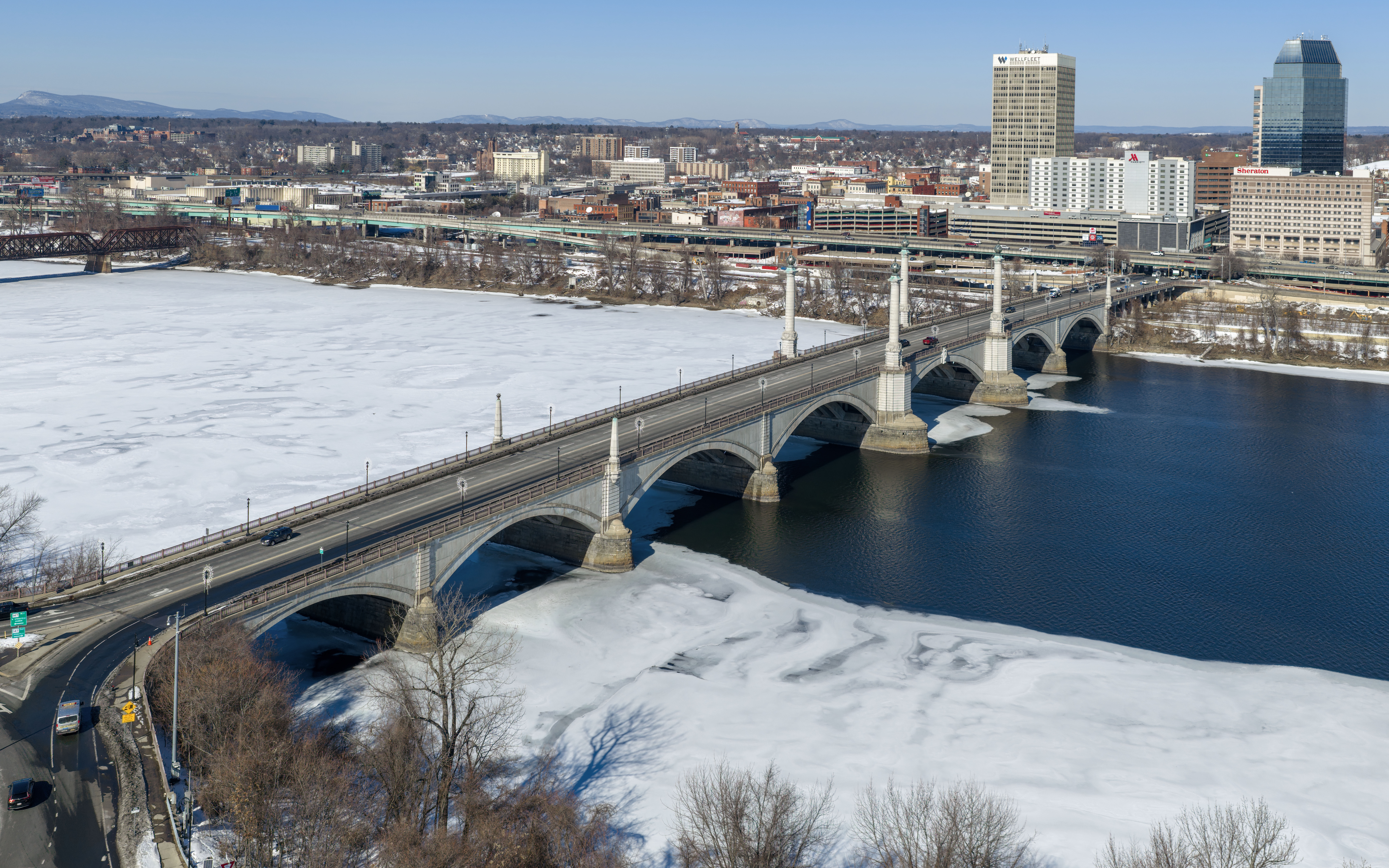
- Memorial Bridge
- Coordinates: 42°05′56″N 72°35′42″W
- Carries: Pedestrian and vehicular traffic
- Crosses: Connecticut River, Amtrak
- Locale: Springfield, Massachusetts, to West Springfield, Massachusetts
- Maintained by: Massachusetts Highway Department

Characteristics
- Design: reinforced-concrete arch bridge
- Total length: 1,515 feet (462 m)
- Width: 82.5 feet (25.1 m)
- Longest span: 209 feet (64 m)

History
- Architect: Haven & Hoyt
- Designer: Fay, Spofford & Thorndike
- Engineering design by: Daniel O'Connell's Sons; Adam & Buxton Constr. Co. George W. Hayden
- Constructed by: H. P. Converse & Co., Contractors
- Construction start: 1920
- Opened: 1922, 1996

Location
- Interactive map of Hampden County Memorial Bridge

The Hampden County Memorial Bridge (sometimes referred to as Springfield Memorial Bridge) is a reinforced-concrete arch bridge that spans the Connecticut River between Springfield, Massachusetts and West Springfield, Massachusetts, constructed in 1922. The bridge is owned by Massachusetts Highway Department. It spans 209 feet (64 m) and rises 29.71 feet (9.06 m) above the river.

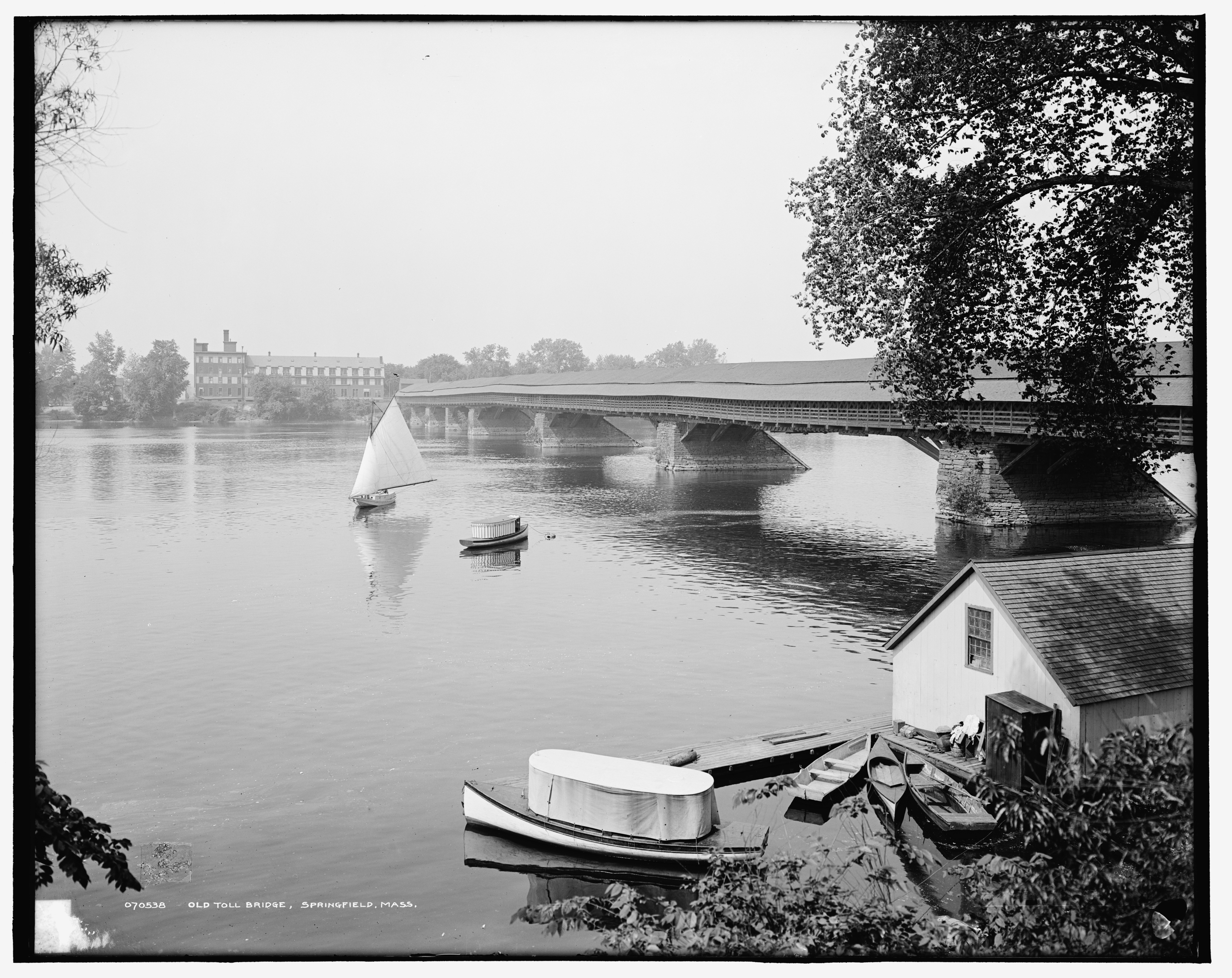
The 1818 bridge as it appeared around 1908

== History and construction of the bridge ==
The Connecticut River was first bridged at Springfield in 1805, by an open wooden bridge said to have been "mongrel in style." It collapsed in 1814 and was replaced by a covered wooden Burr arch-truss bridge built by Isaac Damon of Northampton, Massachusetts. Partly rebuilt after a spring freshet in 1818, Damon's bridge survived into the 20th century, and was the structure which the present concrete arch bridge was built to replace. The location of the 1814 bridge is marked by the position of "Bridge Street" in both Springfield and West Springfield, at approximately 42.100131°N 72.596245°W.

In 1915, the Hampden County Commissioners opened hearings to discuss construction of a new bridge, but it wasn't until the winter of 1918/19 that the location and overall design of the present concrete arch bridge were finally agreed upon. The main construction contract (at $3,254,883 (US$103,590,000 with inflation)) was let to H.P. Converse on April 3, 1920; the completed bridge was opened to traffic on August 3, 1922. At the ceremonies held that day, the bridge was dedicated as a memorial to "those who had died as pioneers, and soldiers in the Revolutionary, Civil and Foreign Wars."

The bridge was designed by Fay Spofford & Thorndike, with Haven & Hoyt, architects. When the bridge was refurbished in 1992, Fay Spofford & Thorndike was again involved.

== Design ==
The Memorial Bridge features a seven-span, reinforced-concrete deck rib arches, with a nine-span reinforced concrete slab viaduct. Each of the river spans is made up of five Melan-type, two-hinged, reinforced-concrete arch ribs of parabolic profile. The bridge's longest ribs have a center to center span of 209 feet (64 m) and a rise of 29.71 feet (9.06 m); the ribs of the other spans vary from 176.5 to 121 feet (53.8 to 36.9 m) in length, with rises from 29.2 to 19.1 feet (8.9 to 5.8 m). The three interior ribs in each span are grouped together near the center of the roadway where a streetcar line was originally located. The two outer ribs are more widely spaced and carry thin concrete fascia walls concealing an open-spandrel design. Reinforced-concrete spandrel columns carry the reinforced-concrete roadway. The viaduct spans the rail yard consists of a reinforced concrete slab deck carried by transverse bents of concrete-encased structural steel. The piers are granite-faced reinforced-concrete.

There were two gargoyles above the bridge on the south side that were removed when the bridge was upgraded several years ago. The four plaques on the central towers honor the original colonists, and veterans of the American Revolutionary War, American Civil War, and World War I.

The 1922 Memorial Bridge includes the longest single concrete arch span in Massachusetts. Its self-supporting steel rib arches represent an uncommon refinement of Melan's original idea – by making the steel arches self-supporting, and using them to support their own load plus the weight of the formwork and the wet concrete during construction, an initial compressive stress was developed in the steel prior to the setting of the concrete. This prestressing of the steel allowed a much higher proportion of its ultimate strength to be utilized, allowing, in turn, the use of smaller and lighter arch ribs and a less massive substructure.

== 1996 rehabilitation project ==
By the 1990s, the concrete above the arches was suffering from advanced Alkali–silica reaction. The 1996 rehabilitation project replaced the entire deck system. The decorative architectural elements were replaced either in kind using cast stone or replaced with architectural fiberglass reproductions. The viaduct over the railroad was replaced with adjacent precast/prestressed deck beams made continuous.

This project was completed by Daniel O'Connell's Sons in 1996.

== See also ==
- List of bridges documented by the Historic American Engineering Record in Massachusetts
- List of crossings of the Connecticut River
