= Mittineague Park =

Park in West Springfield, Massachusetts

Coordinates: 42°6′3″N 72°39′10″W

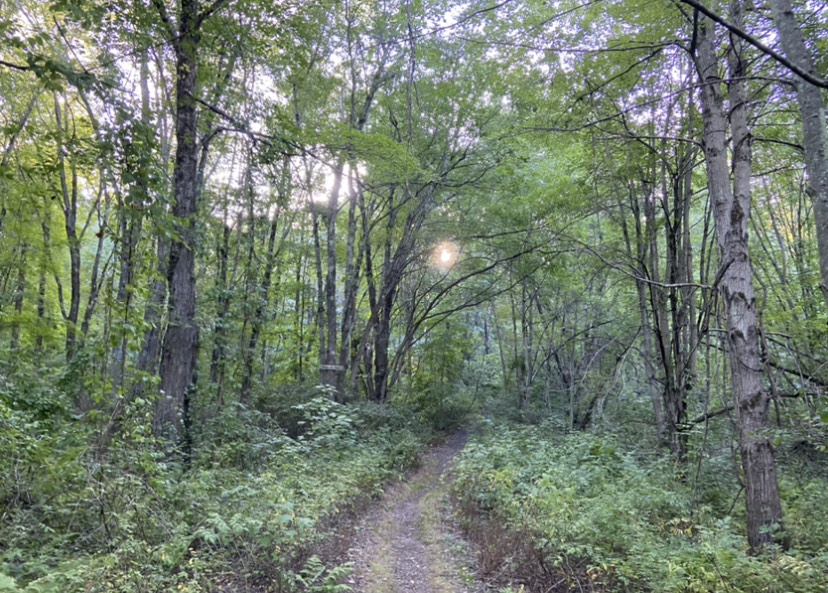
Image of path in Mittineague Park

Mittineague Park is an approximately 325-acre (1.32 km^{2}) urban park located in the southern section of the town of West Springfield, Massachusetts (In neighborhoods, Tatham and Mittineague). Mittineague derives from the Natick words "muttinohkou" and "ohke" which translate to "land on the right". The park contains a wide range of services typical of a park of this type, including many baseball/softball diamonds, and trails for hiking or cross-country skiing. It has a large pavilion, and a building that is used as a summer camp for children with special needs. Special events are scheduled at the park, including events for children. It contains a greenhouse and a community garden. There is an interpretive trail created by the "Friends of Mittineague Park".

Native peoples were active in the area up until 400 years ago. The southwestern part of West Springfield is still called Tatham, a name derived from the Agawam name for the brook ("tattam" = someone encloses; "tattaum" = someone shakes; "taphum" = someone buys it; all in Trumbull, Natick Dictionary, Natick being closest recorded glossary according to Dr. Ives Goddard, "The Loup Languages of Western Massachusetts: Dialectical Diversity in Southern New England, Algonquian Conference 2016). The Westfield River, which runs at the outermost perimeter and most of the park's terrain was created by glaciers (the Hitchcock glacial lake/Laurentide ice sheet) as they retreated 15–20,000 years ago.

Mittineague Park is home to wildlife such as hawks, beavers, frogs, foxes, fisher martens (a.k.a. Fisher Cats), and deer. The deer are most active during the winter season, and are found grazing year round in the meadows which were once part of a farm.
