= Early American publishers and printers =

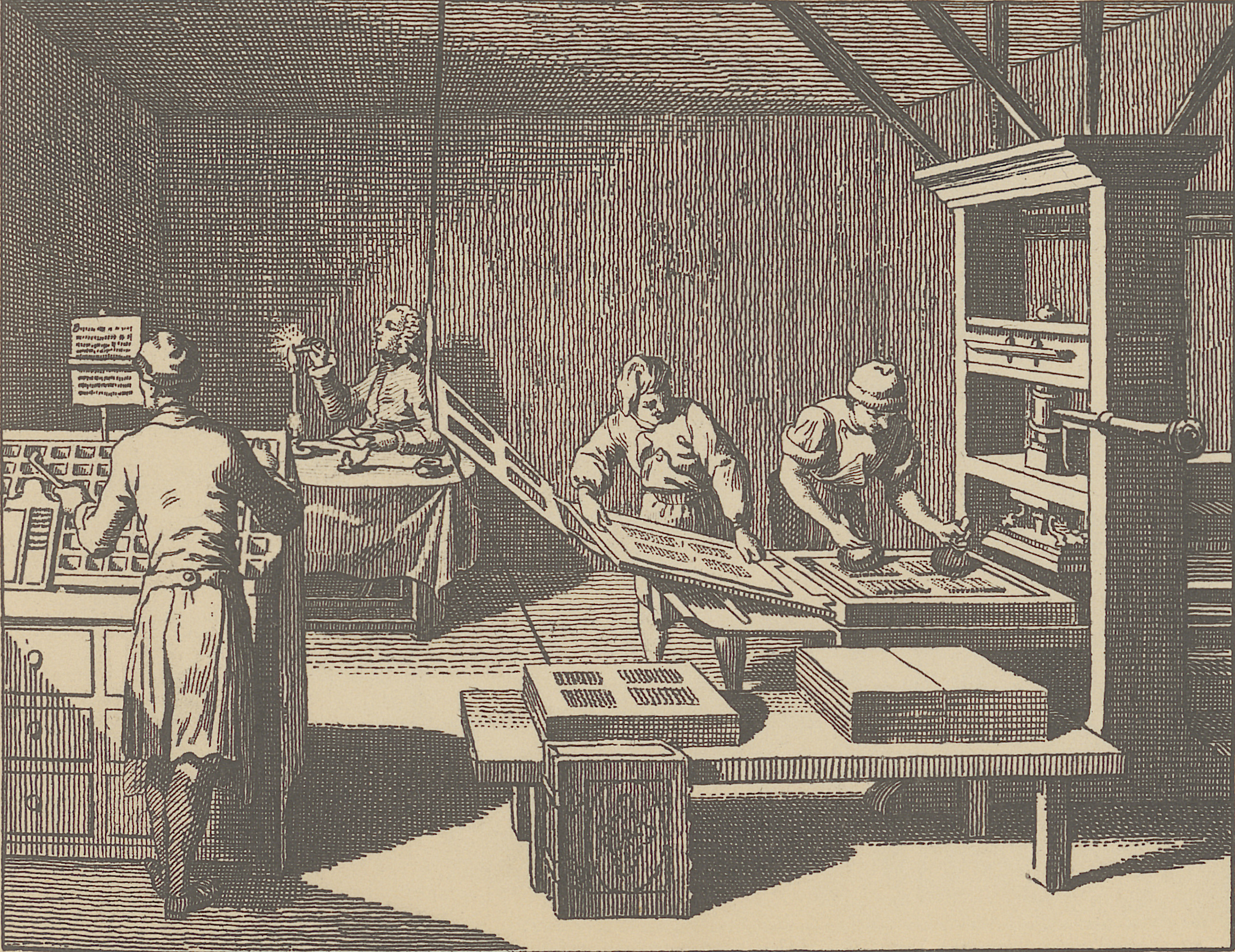
A typical printing press of the 18th century. Religious enthusiasm and the great demand for bibles and other religious works is largely what promoted the first printing efforts in the American colonies. Before and during the American Revolution colonial printers were also actively publishing newspapers and pamphlets expressing the strong sentiment against British colonial policy and taxation.

Early American publishers and printers played a central role in the social, religious, political and commercial development of the Thirteen Colonies in British America prior to and during the American Revolution and the ensuing American Revolutionary War that established American independence.

The first printing press in the British colonies was established in Cambridge, Massachusetts by owner Elizabeth Glover and printer Stephen Daye. Here, the first colonial broadside, almanack, and book were published. Printing and publishing in the colonies first emerged as a result of religious enthusiasm and over the scarcity and subsequent great demand for bibles and other religious literature. By the mid-18th century, printing took on new proportions with the newspapers that began to emerge, especially in Boston. When the British Crown began imposing new taxes, many of these newspapers became highly critical and outspoken about the British colonial government, which was widely considered unfair among the colonists.

In the early years of colonial settlement, communication between the various colonies, which were often hundreds of miles apart, was generally restricted to dispatches, hand-written one at a time, then carried by private carriers to their destinations. Prior to 1700, there were no newspapers in the colonies, so official news came slowly, especially to those who lived away from the colonial seat of government in the major townships or in the remote countryside. Colonial law and news overall was therefore not available in comprehensive print form for the common colonist, whose only knowledge of these things was usually passed on by word of mouth from colonial officials or traveling couriers, or by means of a simple post in a town square. Religious literature was also scarce, and while many colonists possessed bibles, usually brought over from England, they were generally in short supply, while religious literature overall was in great demand among the colonists.

As the British Parliament continued imposing additional taxes, especially with the Stamp Act 1765, several colonial newspapers and pamphlets began openly editorializing against British policies and supporting the aims of the American Revolution. The most notable printers of the time included Benjamin Franklin, William Goddard, William Bradford and others, who were politically involved in the controversy with the British Crown over taxation, freedom of the press and other such rights. A number of printers, including Goddard and Bradford, belonged to the Sons of Liberty and used their printing presses as a means of promoting colonial opposition to the Stamp Act and other royal legislation they deemed unfair to them as colonial Englishmen who lacked representation in Parliament. The open criticism of such advents coming from the press often brought accusations of printing libelous and seditious material.

The plentiful historical accounts of the colonial period still have brought little investigation into how printers affected the religious, social and political growth in the colonies. Most scholarship on printers and publishing in the colonies confines itself to either an account of individuals such as Isaiah Thomas in the context of each colony, or only lends itself to the mechanics of printing presses and typography, as does Lawrence Wroth in The Colonial Printer. According to Wroth, however, the overall subject of early American printing and publishing as it affected political and social issues in the colonies and how it ultimately led to a revolution, which is the focus of this article, has been pursued with a "noticeable reluctance".

== History ==
=== 17th century ===
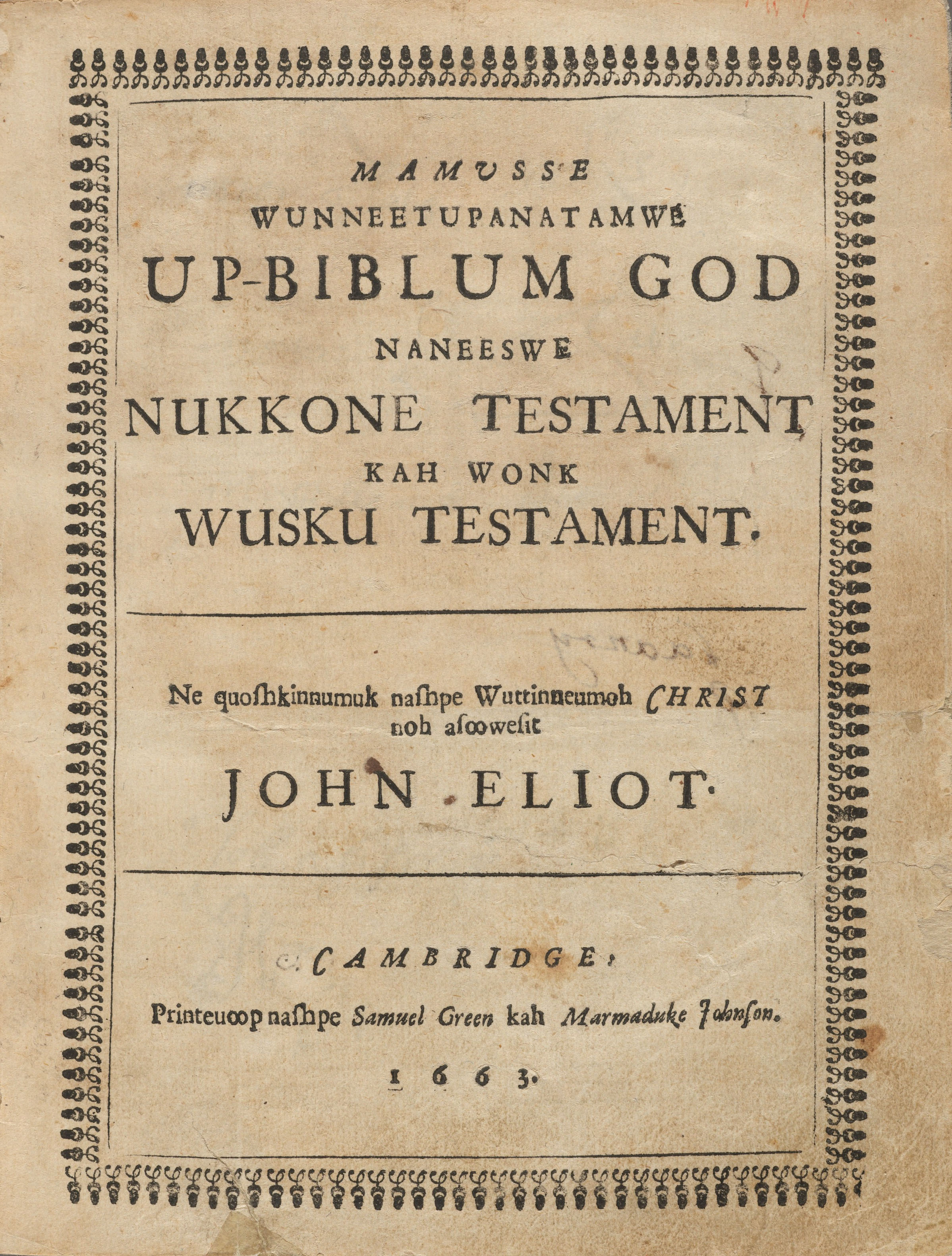
English missionary John Eliot, with the assistance of some Algonquians, including Cockenoe, John Sassamon, Job Nesuton, and James Printer, printed a translation of the Bible into Massachusett in 1663.

Newspapers in colonial America served to disseminate vital political, social and religious information that explicitly appealed to the colonist's growing sense of independence and unity with other Americans. This was a cause of great concern to the royal colonial governments among the colonies who feared that the mass dissemination of news and opinion undermined their authority. Colonial Boston was where the American newspaper emerged, and where it was nurtured through its initial stages. Initially newspapers were delivered through the mails at no charge for postage until 1758.

On September 25, 1690, the first newspaper to emerge in the British colonies in America was the Publick Occurrences Both Forreign and Domestick, printed and published in Boston by Richard Pierce for Benjamin Harris. Harris had fled England for fear of religious persecution and speaking out against the crown. His newspaper was welcomed and received enthusiastically by the colonists, however, it was not approved or well regarded by the colonial governor, especially since it had no official printing license, required by British law at that time. i.e."no person [was to] keep any printing-press for printing, nor [was] any book, pamphlet or other matter whatsoever" without "especial leave and license first obtained" from the governor. As one historian put it, "the first newspaper published in America became the first to be suppressed by the authorities."

In 1695, Harris returned to England where he was arrested for publishing his newspaper. The first successful newspaper in America was The Boston News-Letter, which appeared in 1704, and until 1719 it was the only newspaper published in the colonies.

=== 18th century ===
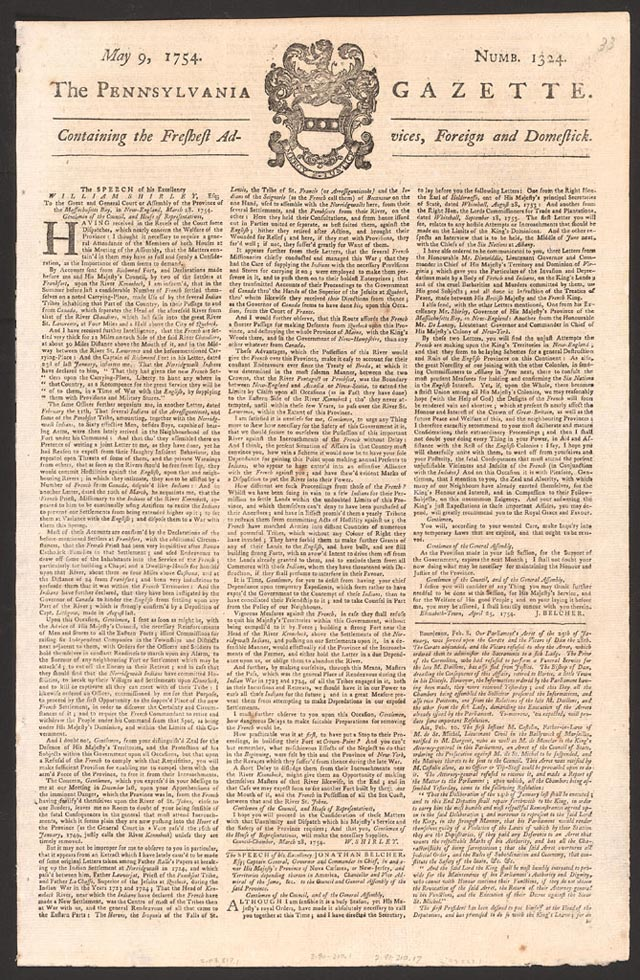
The May 9, 1754 issue of The Pennsylvania Gazette, published in Philadelphia

In 1704, the colonies' second newspaper, The Boston News-Letter, appeared. Printed by Bartholomew Green for John Campbell, proprietor and Postmaster in Boston, this newspaper was also published in Boston, but had government approval and remained in operation for 74 years until 1776, when the British occupied Boston. The Hartford Courant is considered to be the oldest continuously published newspaper in the United States, though there is some debate on that status. Before the Stamp Act 1765 there were twenty-four newspapers among the colonies, save New Jersey, whose news came from newspapers in neighboring Philadelphia and New York. By 1787 Thomas Jefferson expressed the sentiment now shared by many printers over the idea of freedom of the press when he said, "Were it left to me to decide whether we should have a government without newspapers or newspapers without a government, I should not hesitate a moment to prefer the latter."

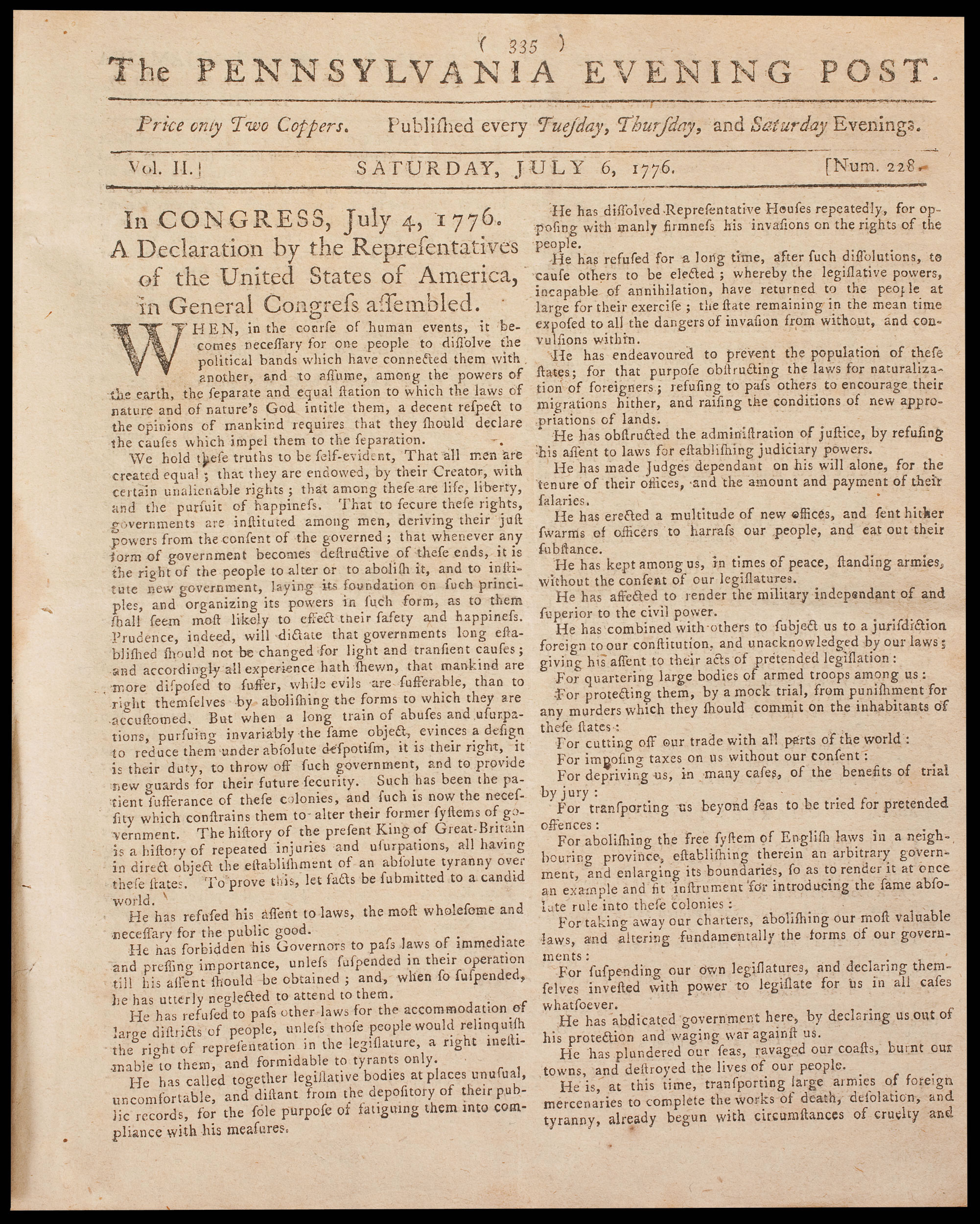
The Pennsylvania Evening Post was the first newspaper to publish the Declaration of Independence following its unanimous adoption on July 4, 1776, by the Second Continental Congress.

In the beginning of the 18th century, there were twice as many printers in Boston as there were for in all the other colonies combined. There were only six American newspapers, where four of them were published in Boston. The majority of the books and pamphlets of the period bore a Boston imprint, making eastern Massachusetts the literary and typographic center of colonial America.

Colonial newspapers played an active role during the Christian revivalist controversy that occurred in the early 1740s. The controversy started in and centered around Boston, where Thomas Fleet was one of the most visible critics, using his Boston Evening Post to publish criticism against the established Clergy, along with the newspaper of Thomas Prince, The Christian History.

Among the dozens of newspapers that existed before and during the American Revolution, many of them proved to be exceptionally noteworthy in terms of criticizing colonial government, promoting freedom of the press, and other freedoms, and furthering the cause for American independence. Newspapers easily accomplished these ends as they had already become indispensable to the colonists who relied on them for information prior to the revolution, and who considered the printed distribution of materials an essential means in keeping the overall community informed, while promoting the ideals of freedom they embraced. Newspapers would also play an important role in outlining public debates while the Constitution was being ratified in 1787–1788.

==== American Revolution ====
The idea of an independent American union began to emerge after the French and Indian War, when the Parliament began imposing heavy taxes on the colonies for the debts Britain incurred during that war. By 1774, the idea for an independent union was not yet one of complete separation from the mother country in England and had assumed that the colonies would still be an essential component of the British Empire and still under the authority of the King and Parliament. By the end of 1773, after the Boston Tea Party, the idea of a colonial independent union with its own government began appearing and promoted in various newspaper articles and essays, most often written anonymously by newspaper editors for fear of reprisal and prosecution. They promoted the idea that there was a need for an “American Congress” that would speak on behalf of the Americans, and in no uncertain terms insisted that an independent American congress should have equal status with British authority. After the Boston Tea Party, the British responded with the Intolerable Acts that, among other things, closed down the busy port of Boston. Word of this incursion quickly spread in newspapers and broadsides and in response the various colonies, in support of Massachusetts whose trade had largely been halted, sent representatives to Philadelphia and formed the First Continental Congress.

To assert pressure on England to repeal the acts, they formed the Continental Association, which called for a colony wide boycott of British goods. Considered by many historians as the first significant step towards colonial independence, this only served to infuriate King George III. Within months, he sent British troops to Boston, where they participated in the Lexington and Concord in April 1775, the first battles of the American Revolutionary War. The war caused many printers to flee Massachusetts and relocate their shops elsewhere or otherwise close down. Newspapers such as the Boston Gazette and The Providence Gazette were among the most visible in publishing literature that fostered the idea of American independence, which now was receiving popular support among the colonies.

=== Publications ===
The first magazine that appeared in American colonies, The American Monthly Magazine, was printed by Andrew Bradford in February 1741, edited by John Webbe. The first religious periodical published in America, was the Ein Geistliches Magazin, by Sower in 1764. In 1719, the Boston Gazette was established in Boston and the first newspaper in Philadelphia, The American Weekly Mercury, was founded by Andrew Bradford.

In 1736, the first newspaper in to emerge in Virginia was the Virginia Gazette, (Note: Not to be confused with the rival newspaper of the same name, published also in Williamsburg) founded by William Rind in Virginia. Rind was soon appointed public printer. This gazette printed Thomas Jefferson's A Summary View of the Rights of British America in 1774, two years before he drafted the Declaration of Independence. Also in 1774, the Virginia Gazette reprinted the articles of the Continental Association, calling for a boycott on British goods, drafted and signed by members of the First Continental Congress, in response to the Intolerable Acts, which united the colonies in a boycott of British goods and a prohibition against any exports to England. The articles in this Association were met with mixed reactions from the colonists, and from various American and British individuals in Britain, with letters for and against the measure appearing in colonial newspapers, with criticisms coming mostly from moderate or loyalist presses.

On April 22, 1775, three days after the Battles of Lexington and Concord, the Virginia Gazette reported that a large quantity of gunpowder in Williamsburg had been stolen during the night by order of Lord Dunmore. The news traveled quickly and was repeated in The Pennsylvania Evening Post. The news reports subsequently prompted Dunmore to pay for the gunpowder and for a time averted armed conflict in Virginia.

The New-England Courant made its appearance on Monday, August 7, 1721, as the third newspaper to appear in Boston and the fourth in the colonies. Founded in Boston by James Franklin, Benjamin Franklin's older brother, who was started in retaliation for losing his printing job at the Boston Gazette when its ownership changed hands and the printing was given to Samuel Kneeland. Writing under the assumed name of Silence Dogood, Benjamin Franklin wrote more than a dozen articles. One such article led to James Franklin's month long imprisonment in 1726 by British colonial authorities for printing what they considered seditious articles after he refused to reveal the identity of the author. After being released, James resumed his printing practice. Franklin's newspaper had been current for only four months when it was ordered shut down, where he was "... strictly forbidden by this Court to print or publish the New-England Courant, or any other pamphlet or paper of the like nature, except it be first supervised by the Secretary of this Province; and the Justices of His Majesty's Sessions of the Peace for the County of Suffolk ..."

On October 2, 1729, Samuel Keimer, the owner of The Pennsylvania Gazette in Philadelphia, who failed to make a success out of this newspaper, fell into debt and before fleeing to Barbados sold the Gazette to Benjamin Franklin and his partner Hugh Meredith. (Note: Franklin and Meredith began the paper with No. 40) Under Franklin The Gazette became the most successful newspaper in the colonies. On December 28, 1732, through the Gazette Franklin announced that he had just printed and published the first edition of The Poor Richard, (better known as Poor Richard's Almanack) by Richard Saunders, Philomath. The almanack proved to be a huge success with a printing run that lasted more than twenty-five years.

On June 19, 1744, Franklin took on David Hall, introduced by William Strahan while Franklin was in England, as a business partner and made him manager in charge of the Gazette, allowing Franklin the time to pursue his scientific and other interests. Upon the proposal of the Stamp Act, Hall warned Franklin that subscribers to their newspaper were already canceling their accounts in anticipation of the unpopular tax — not over an increase in the cost it would place on the newspaper, but on principle. (Note: Hall to Franklin, June 20, 1765, Franklin papers, 12: 188–189) After buying out Franklin in May 1766, Hall took on another partner and established a new firm of Hall and Sellers, which printed the Continental paper currency issued by Congress during the American Revolutionary War.

James Davis came to the North Carolina province in 1749, answering a call by their Assembly for an official printer to print their laws, legal journals and paper currency. He became the first printer to establish a print shop in that colony and in the process, founded and printed North Carolina's first newspaper, the North-Carolina Gazette. In 1755 Benjamin Franklin appointed Davis as the first postmaster of North Carolina.

The first newspaper established in Connecticut was The Connecticut Gazette in New Haven, on April 12, 1755, a weekly newspaper issued every Friday, by James Parker, in New Haven. As the premier newspaper in that colony, it functioned as a military record in reporting the events of the French and Indian War. Parker's partner was Benjamin Franklin who often helped printers in getting started. That year Parker also published 10 religious pamphlets, five almanacs and two New York newspapers. He rarely visited New Haven and left his junior partner, John Holt, as the editor of the newspaper. The Gazette had, for a time, a large circulation throughout the Connecticut Colony. The Gazette was continued by Parker & Company till 1764, was briefly suspended, but was later revived by Benjamin Mecom. Its motto, printed on its front page read, "Those who would give up Essential Liberty, to purchase a little Temporary Safety, deserve neither Liberty nor Safety". The Gazette, like other newspapers of that period, was highly critical of the Stamp Act.

The Providence Gazette, at the time the only newspaper in Providence, was first published October 20, 1762, by William Goddard, and later with his sister Mary Katherine Goddard. The Providence Gazette was published weekly and passionately defended the rights of the colonies before the revolution and ably supported the cause of the country during the war. After American independence was established following the war it continued to promote federal republican principles.

The Pennsylvania Chronicle, published by William Goddard, whose first edition was published on January 6, 1767, was the fourth newspaper to be printed in the English language established in Philadelphia, and the first newspaper in the northern colonies to have four columns to a page.

John Dunlap was commissioned by the Second Continental Congress to print 200 broadsides of the Declaration of Independence, which was authored predominantly by Thomas Jefferson and unanimously adopted by the Second Continental Congress on July 4, 1776. These copies came to be known as the Dunlap broadsides. John Hancock sent a copy to General Washington and his Continental Army, who were in New York, with instructions that the Declaration be read aloud to Continental Army troops.

The Pennsylvania Evening Post was a newspaper published by Benjamin Towne from 1775 to 1783 during the Revolutionary War. The Pennsylvania Evening Post was the first newspaper to publish the Declaration of Independence and the first daily newspaper to be established in the United States.

In 1740, there were 16 newspapers, all published weekly, in British America. By the time the American Revolutionary War commenced in 1775, the number had grown to 37 with most of them editorialized in support of the American patriot cause and independence from Britain.

== Freedom of the Press ==
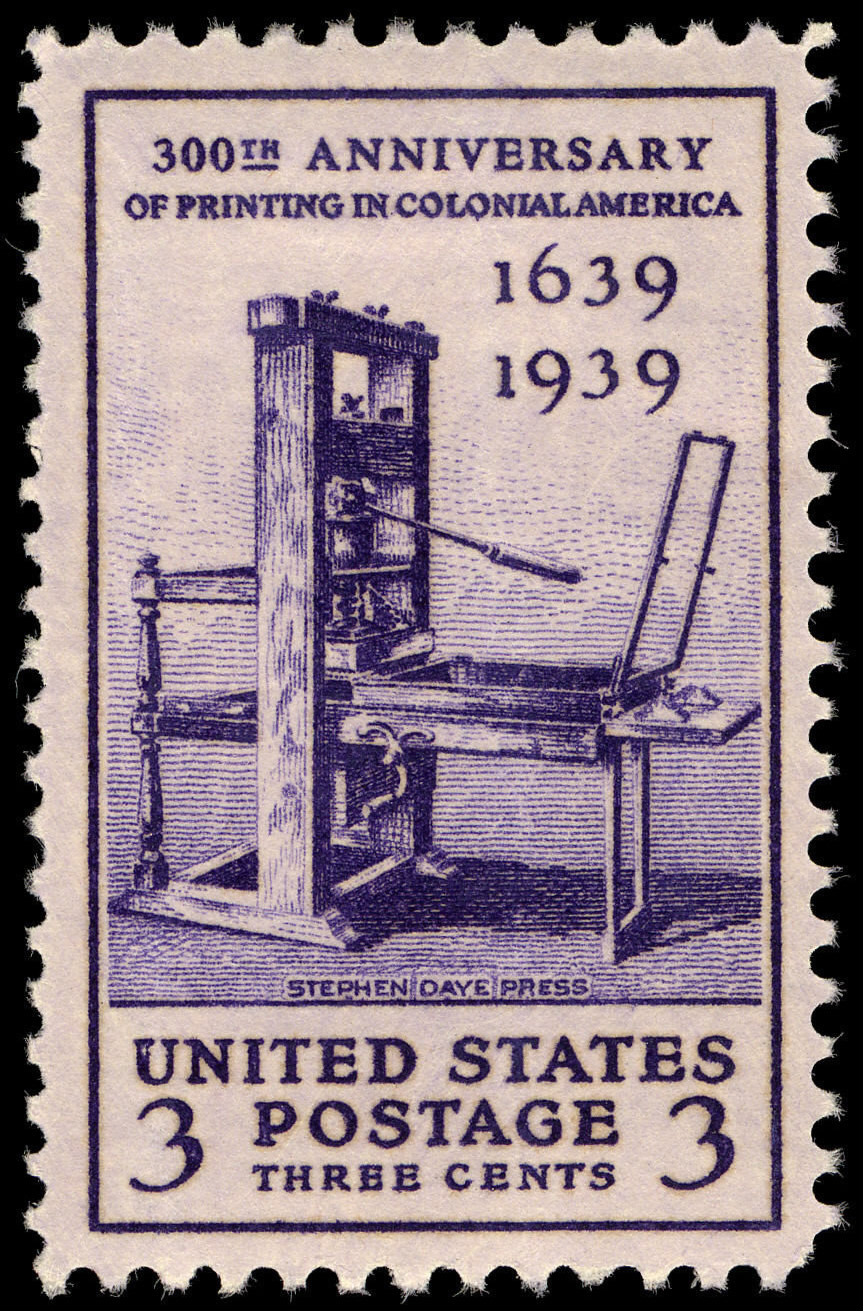
In 1939, the United States Postal Service issued a stamp depicting John Day's printing press and commemorating the 300th anniversary of publishing during the colonial era.

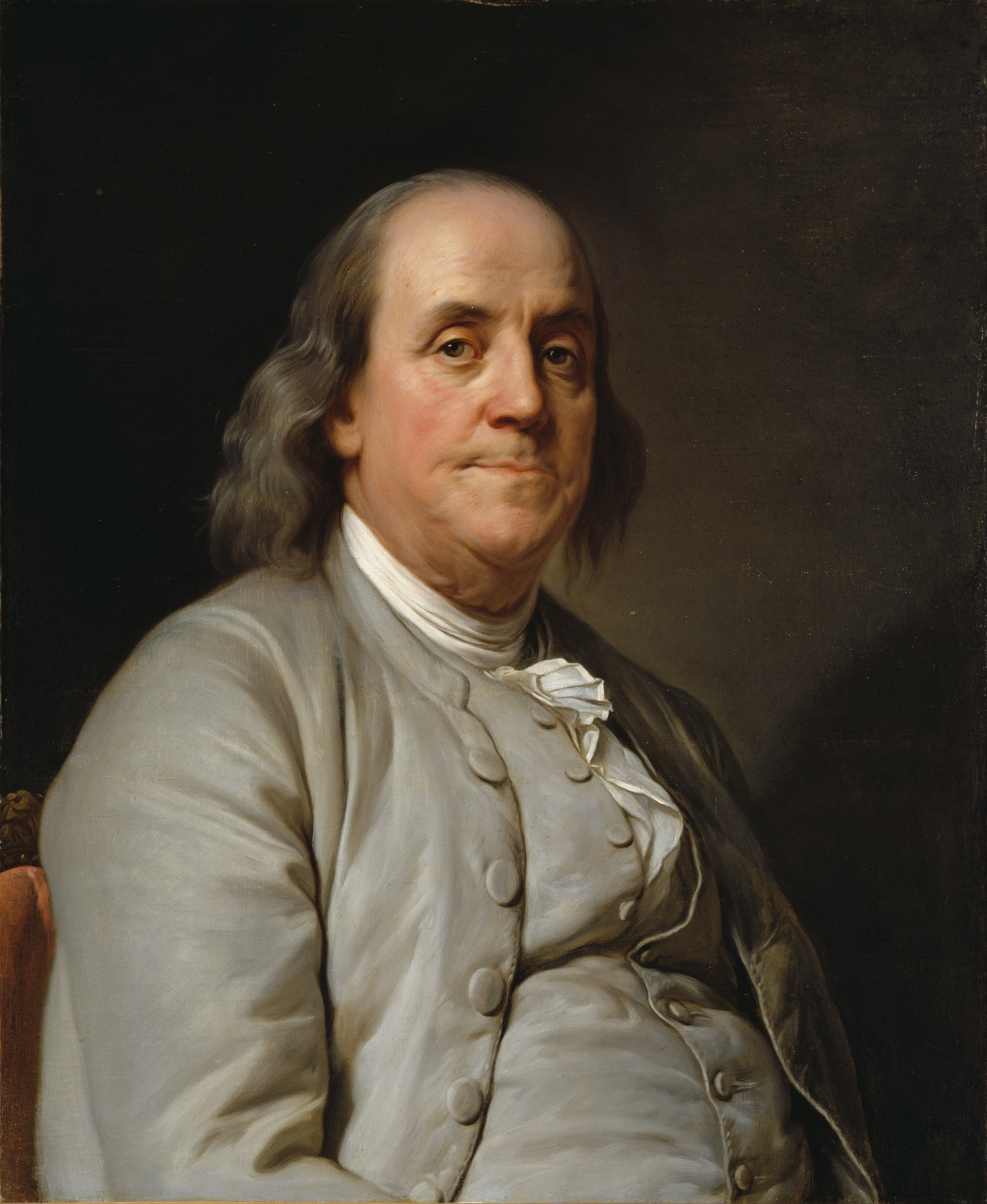
Beginning in the early 18th century, Benjamin Franklin became the most active printer and publisher in the Thirteen Colonies.

Many printers in England who were printing literature promoting the English Reformation fled England to the European continent or to the new world to escape religious and political prosecution under the reigns of King Henry VIII and Queen Mary I, both Catholics who were trying, unsuccessfully, to reverse the Reformation movement during their reigns. John Daye, who was printing and distributing Protestant literature and pamphlets, was a definitive example of this advent. At the same time there was a need for the General Assembly to establish a press and appoint an official printer to perform the printing of legislative acts in the colonies.

With the invention of the printing press a powerful tool was given to the common class who naturally was inclined to publicly challenge monarchial authority. In relatively little time the potential influence of the printing press became evident in many countries and increased with the years, despite all the efforts at censorship by the ruling class.

In 1660, Marmaduke Johnson was sent over from England to work with Samuel Green in the printing of a Bible translated into an Indian language by John Eliot. When this enormous task was completed Johnson returned to England, and within a year came back to the colonies with his own printing press with the intention of starting his own private enterprise. Laws requiring the Court approval and licensing had been repealed, but upon Johnson's return they were reinstated with Johnson specifically in mind. After several failed appeals to the Court, they finally conceded to his wishes, with a few restrictions in place, allowing Johnson in 1674 to become the first printer in the American colonies to operate his own press. Unfortunately Johnson died shortly thereafter that same year and never fulfilled that dream. John Foster bought Johnson's equipment and became the first printer to produce a woodcut (of Richard Mather) in the American colonies and began to produce work on a privately operated press.

Before 1660, prosecutions involving seditious news accounts were virtually unknown in the colonies, but a pattern of change became evident in the latter 1600s. Prosecutions involving sedition climbed from a low of only 0.7 percent in the 1660s to 15.1 percent by the 1690s. Despite the fact that the alleged cases almost always involved the truth, they were clearly on the rise in the colonies. Historian Larry D. Eldridge notes that there were 1,244 seditious speech prosecutions before the Zenger case, and has drawn from the court records of every colony that existed before 1700. During this time many writers accordingly felt it necessary to write under an assumed name for fear of prosecution and confiscation of their printing presses.

As printing was looked upon by Puritan colonial authorities with a wary eye, requiring a license from the general assembly to operate, the printing trade emerged slowly. Salem was the third town in the Colonies, after Cambridge and Boston, to see the introduction of a printing press, and Newport soon followed. Many printers were accused of sedition and libel for publishing critical accounts of various colonial authority. The first such significant case of press censorship presented itself during the trial of Thomas Maule in 1696, when he publicly criticized the conduct of Puritans during one of the Salem Witch Trials. For publishing his work, Truth Held Forth and Maintained, he was arraigned as the first person in the province to be prosecuted for the crime of libel. Maule was sentenced to receive ten lashings for saying that Rev. John Higginson "preached lies, and that his instruction was the doctrine of devils."

With the 1727 arrival of James Franklin, Newport, Rhode Island became the fourth New England town with a printing press. Franklin had removed to the more liberal town of Newport from Boston because of the ordeals he had experienced when he criticized various official and religious dignitaries in his newspaper, The New-England Courant, which he was jailed for in 1722. (Note: The counterfeiting of ten shilling notes was a problem in Rhode island at this time, and Franklin explained why they were so easy to duplicate and offered an alternative method, but he was passed over for Samuel Vernon for the job.)

Another definitive example involved the trial of John Peter Zenger who was tried for libel in New York in 1735 for allegedly libeling Governor William Cosby, but was freed on the basis that Zenger's account was true. The now landmark case proved to be an importance step toward establishing freedom of the press in the colonies. The British government subsequently felt that the printing and publishing trade as practiced in the colonies undermined their authority.

While the technology of printing saw little change from the middle of the seventeenth century to the end of the eighteenth, its usefulness broadened considerably during this time. The first printing press arrived in the colonies in 1638. It belonged to Elizabeth Glover and was operated by Stephen Daye (Note: Daye's printing press is depicted on a 1939 U.S. Postage stamp, commemorating the 300th anniversary of printing in colonial America.) and was part of the founding of Harvard University. This press was established to allow the printing of religious works without fear of interference from Parliament. Its first printing turned out the Freeman's Oath, published in January 1639. It was at this press that printers got their training, and their books, pamphlets and broadsides helped to promote and sustain the enlightenment movement in New England. Printing presses, books and newspapers were primarily found in the northern colonies, as the southern colonies were either royal or proprietary and were not allowed to govern themselves as much as those in the north during their early histories.

In 1752 Jonathan Mayhew, the founder of Unitarian Church in America, openly criticized the colonial government in Massachusetts. One of Mayhew's sermons, during an election, strongly promoted the Republican form of government. His sermon was published just after the colonial Assembly passed a bill imposing various custom duties. The bill was strongly attacked in a pamphlet from the offices of Samuel Adams' newspaper, The Independent Advertiser. The bill was derided as the " Monitor of Monitors," claiming that the Legislature was tartly handled. Immediately after the publication of Mayhew's sermon, it became the cause for alarm and consternation among the colonial authorities. David Fowle, the printer, brother of Zechariah Fowle, also a printer, was arrested and, for refusing to divulge the name of the writer of the newspaper article, was sent to jail and harsly interrogated for several days. Fowle became disgusted with the Government of Massachusetts and removed to Portsmouth and bought out New Hampshire Gazette, where he would publicly criticize the Stamp Act 1765.

== Religious printing ==
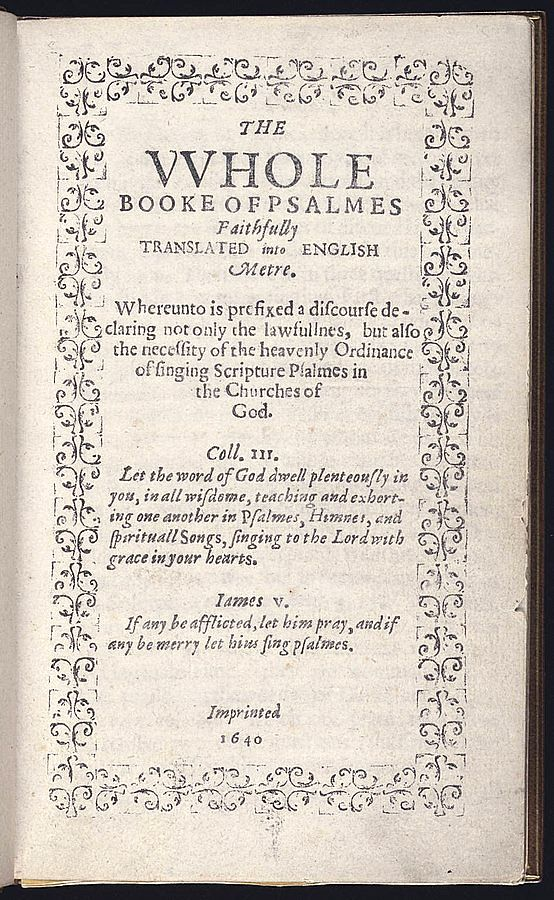
The Psalms, which was translated into English and published by Stephen Daye in Cambridge, Massachusetts in 1640, was the first book printed in British America.

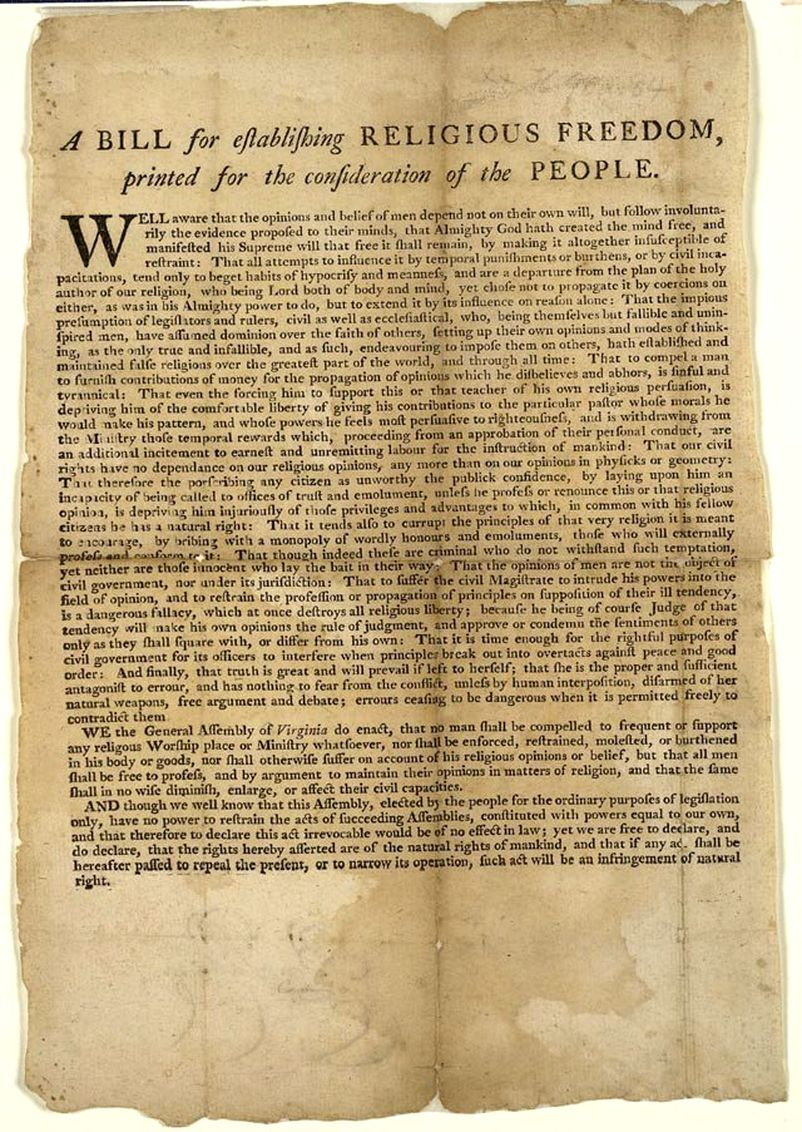
Thomas Jefferson's Bill for Establishing Religious Freedom, published in Williamsburg, Virginia in 1779, is the earliest known printed version of the proposed bill. (Note: No reference can be found in the Journals of the Virginia House of Delegates about the printing of Jefferson's Bill as it was submitted to the May 1779 session, though it is attributed to the year 1785 in the bibliographies of Sabin and others, it was printed in the summer of 1779 as a broadside.)

Religious perspectives became prominent in colonial American literature during the later 17th-century and into the 18th-century, and were mostly found in Puritan writings and publications, (Note: Other than the Bible itself, Michael Wigglesworth, with editorial comment by Cotton Mather, both Puritan ministers, published The Day of Doom, the most popular book in colonial America, which could be found in virtually every Puritan home.) often resulting in charges of libel and sedition levied by the British Crown. The Puritans already had a history for being persecuted for printing and distributing their views in England, openly criticizing the Church of England. In 1637 King Charles passed a Star Chamber decree outlining 33 regulations that provided for the complete control and censoring of any religious, political or other literature they deemed seditious or otherwise questionable. Among other regulations, it forbade any literature that criticized the Church of England, the State, or the government. (Note: The thirty-three regulations are outlined in Clyde Duniway's work of 1906.) The decree bore hard upon all minority parties, but with special severity upon Catholics, Puritans, and separatists. The provisions also gave the authority for the punishment of unlawful publications in the colonies where such impositions were employed in an effort to silence the Puritans. Archbishop William Laud in particular was the most persistent in preventing and punishing unauthorized printing of religious, political and other material. By 1730, however, enforcing these provisions, in the colonies, which included the licensing of printing presses, prior approval of literature slated for publication, etc., became increasingly difficult.

In 1663, English Puritan missionary John Eliot over the course of forty years, attracted some eleven hundred Indians to the Christian faith, and established fourteen reservations, or "praying towns" for his followers. Along with other religious works, he published what came to be known as the Eliot Indian Bible. Printed by Samuel Green it was the first Bible published in British-American colonies in an effort to introduce Christianity to the Indian peoples. Eliot's Bible was a translation of the Geneva Bible into the Algonquian language commonly spoken by the Indians in Massachusetts.

In 1752, Samuel Kneeland and his partner Bartholomew Green, commissioned by Daniel Henchman, printed an edition of the King James Bible that was the first Bible printed in the American colonies in the English language. As the British Crown owned the printing rights it was illegal to print this Bible in America. Subsequently, the printing was conducted as privately as possible and bore the London imprint from which it was copied, to avoid prosecution and detection of the unauthorized printing. In the process Kneeland was printing the first Bible ever produced from the Boston Press.

Cotton Mather was a Puritan minister in New England and a prolific author of books and pamphlets and is considered one of the most important intellectual figures in colonial America. Mather made free use of the presses in the New England colonies, sometimes in an effort to counter the attacks made on Puritans by George Keith and others. Between 1724 and 1728 he printed sixty-three titles on colonial presses. He is noted for his Magnalia Christi Americana, published in 1702, which outlines the religious development of Massachusetts, and other nearby colonies in New England from 1620 to 1698. In an effort to promote Puritan ethics, he wrote, Ornaments for the Daughters of Zion, written for the benefit of young women on appropriate dress and behavior. He became a controversial figure for his involvement in the events surrounding the Salem witch trials of 1692–1693.

Jonas Green, a protégé of Benjamin Franklin in Philadelphia, and member of the Green family, had been engaged in operating the presses of the Puritan colonies. For twenty-eight years Green was the public printer to the province of Maryland. Joseph Galloway, (Note: Galloway was a former speaker of the Pennsylvania General Assembly and later served as delegate to the First Continental Congress from Pennsylvania.) a close friend of Franklin, opposed the Revolution as a Tory, and by 1778 had fled to England. Like many Tories he believed, as he asserted in this pamphlet, that the Revolution was, to a considerable extent, a religious quarrel, caused by Presbyterians (Note: Galloway had harbored a deep resentment of the Presbyterians that dated back to the 1760s and with whom he regarded as rioters and of the baser elements of society.) and Congregationalists and the circular letters and other accounts they had printed and distributed. Benjamin Franklin, however, raised as a Presbyterian, who for a time became a Deist, then a non-denominational Protestant Christian, realized the value of printing and promoting overall religious values as a means of strengthening the social fabric and as a means of uniting the colonies in their opposition to British rule. (Note: Franklin emphasized the important role of general religion when he wrote, "If men are so wicked as we now see them with religion, what would they be without it?") Franklin ultimately published more religious works than any other eighteenth-century American printers.

Thomas Dobson, who arrived in Philadelphia in 1754 was the first printer in the United States to publish a complete Hebrew Bible. Robert Aitken, a Philadelphia printer who arrived there in 1769, was the first to publish the Bible and the New Testament in the English language in the newly formed United States.

The Christian History, a weekly journal, featured various accounts of the revival and propagation of religion in Great-Britain and America. It was published by Kneeland & Greene, with Thomas Prince Jr., as editor and publisher, was issued regularly for two years, from March 5, 1743, to February 23, 1745. Prince authored other works, including his definitive 1744 work, An Account of the Revival of Religion in Boston between the Years 1740-1743. (Note: Originally printed in 1744, republished by Samuel T. Armstrong in 1823)

== Colonial taxation ==
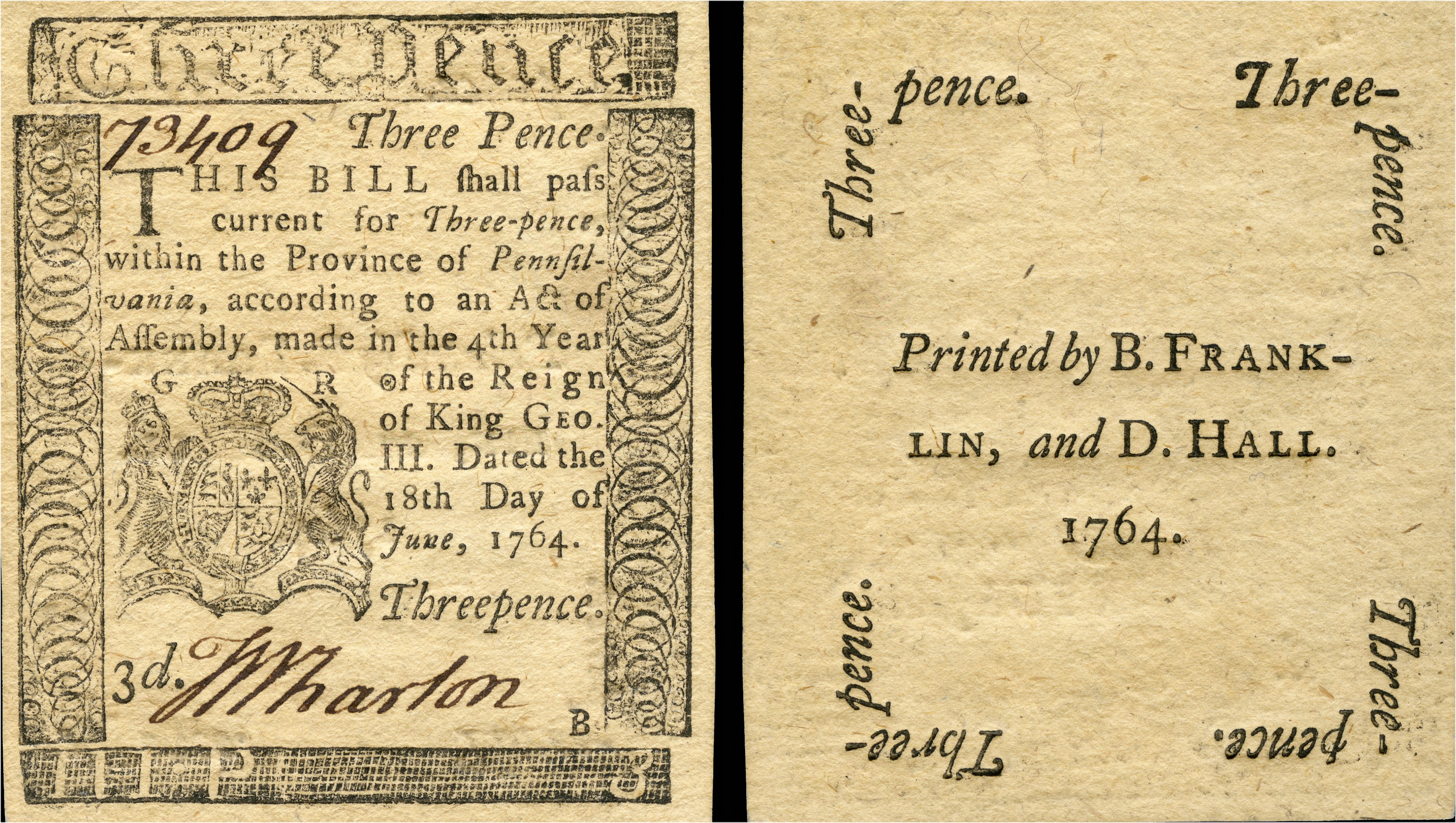
A three Pence note, colonial money in British America, printed in 1764

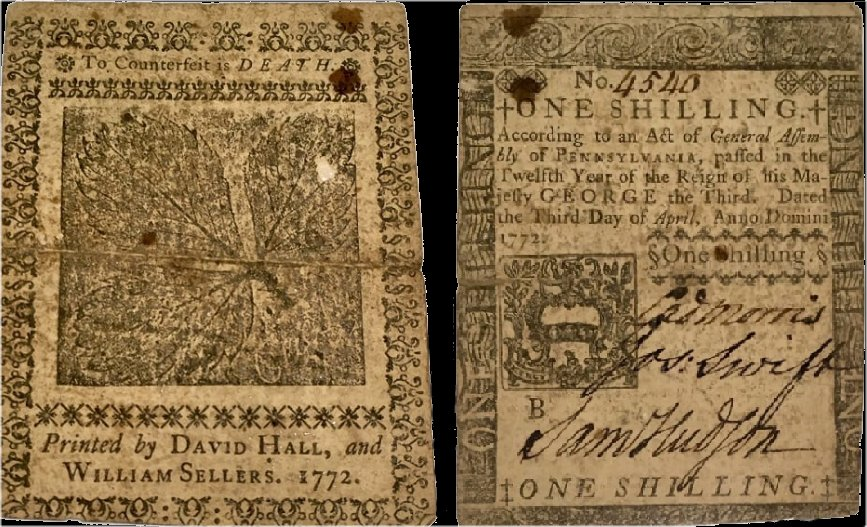
One Shilling note, colonial money in British America, printed in 1772

After the costly French and Indian War, Britain was heavily in debt and began taxing her colonies, without proper colonial representation in Parliament. This was cause for great concern among many of the colonists who were already struggling financially and felt that they had already contributed heavily, with lives, property and money towards a war that was mostly fought on American soil. Before long colonial indifference turned into public protests and open revolt, while publishers and printers began turning out newspapers and pamphlets that pointedly expressed their anger and sense of injustice. Notable figures such as James Otis Jr. and Samuel Adams were among the most visible and outspoken opponents of colonial taxation, whose voices were echoed in numerous colonial newspapers and pamphlets.

Boston was at the center of rebellion before the revolution broke out into armed conflict. The Boston Gazette, established April 7, 1755, by Edes and Gill, was considered the "pet of the patriots". Its pages featured New England's editorial battles for American freedom and voiced opinion from men such as Samuel Adams, Joseph Warren, John Adams, Thomas Cushing, Samuel Cooper and others, over the American Revenue Act 1764, the Stamp Act 1765, the Boston Massacre, the Tea Act 1773 and other such issues that were widely considered impositions and injustices towards the colonies.

=== Stamp Act ===
Newspapers with black borders protesting the Stamp Act

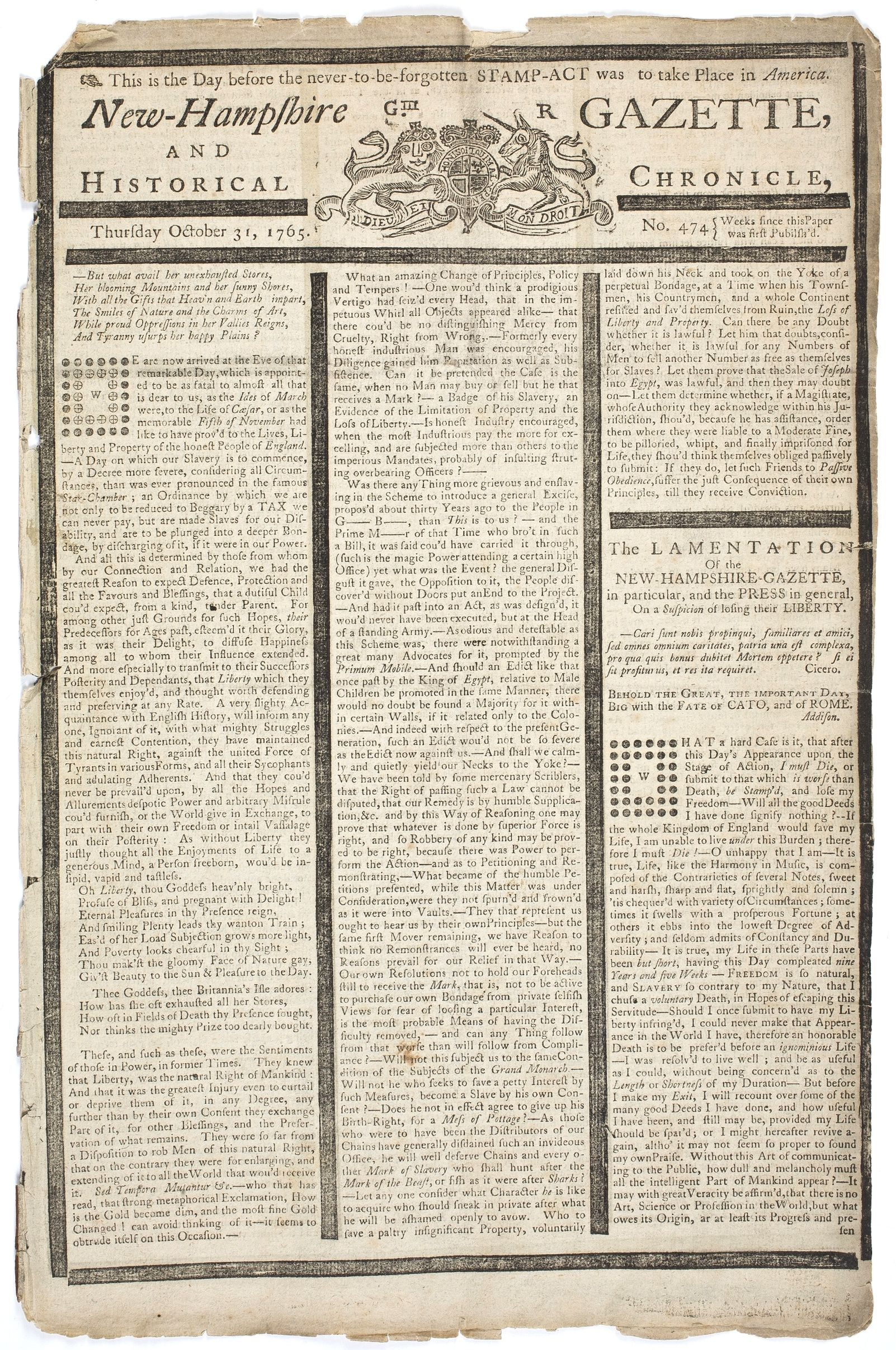
New Hampshire Gazette, October 31, 1765, issue

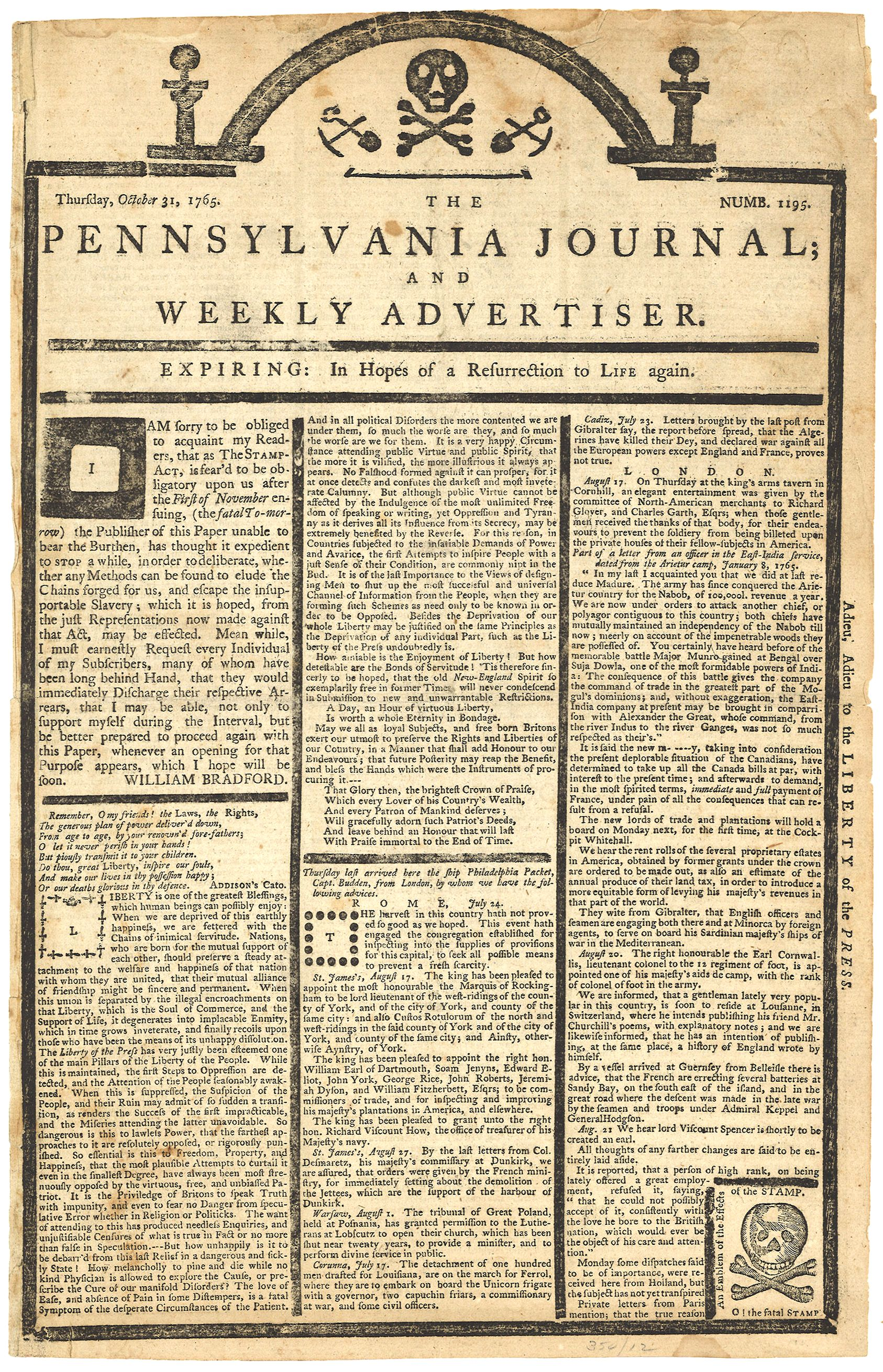
The Pennsylvania Journal, October 31, 1765, issue

With the passage of the Stamp Act in 1765, which imposed a tax on newspapers and advertisements, deeds, wills, claims, indentures, contracts and other such legal documents, (Note: The duties or taxes imposed by the Stamp Act had to be paid in gold or silver. The Stamp Act imposed a Sterling Halfpenny on every half sheet of newspaper, two Shillings Sterling on every advertisement, and Fourpiece Sterling on every almanac.) printers began publishing highly polemic accounts challenging the morality of the Act – an effort that often invited charges of sedition and libel from royal colonial authorities. Newspaper printers and publishers felt the new tax would greatly increase the costs of their newspapers and other publications, and would likely cause much of their readership to drop their subscriptions. Many newspaper editors protested the Stamp Act by printing editions with black borders along the edges, and often included articles that strongly derided the Stamp Act. Some newspapers printed a death's head with skull and bones where a royal stamp was supposed to appear. The passage of the act also caused many printers to suspend their publications rather than to pay what they strongly felt was an unfair tax and an imposition on their livelihood, subsequently uniting them in their opposition to its legislation. Newspapers were the vehicle that asserted the greatest social and political pressure on the Stamp Act and were instrumental in its repeal less than a year later.

The Constitutional Courant was a single issue colonial American newspaper published in response to the Stamp Act. Printed by William Goddard under the assumed name of Andrew Marvel, the newspaper vociferously attacked the Stamp Act in strong language, which caught the attention of colonial printers and royal colonial officials alike. Other examples included The Halifax Gazette, which also published a highly critical account, proclaiming that "The people of the province were disgusted with the stamp act." The damning paragraph gave great offense to the royal government of that province, and its publisher, Anthony Henry, was called to account for printing what the Crown considered to be sedition.

While in England, Benjamin Franklin's Pennsylvania Gazette had its publication suspended on October 31, 1765, in protest of the Stamp Act, after which Franklin's partner, David Hall, began printing the paper on un-stamped paper, without the masthead, so as to avoid any prosecution.

The Sons of Liberty took an active role by intimidating those royal officials charged with its operation and collection of taxes. As newspapers continued to openly criticize the Stamp Act the often violent protests spread, causing many tax collecting commissioners throughout the colonies to quit their jobs. Benjamin Franklin, while serving as colonial agent in London, had warned the Parliament that the act would only serve to create animosity between the colonies and the British Crown. After much protest the act was repealed in 1766. Newspaper coverage of the Stamp Act, and public protests, marked the first serious colonial challenge to British rule over the colonies.

=== Townshend Acts ===
In response to the failure and repeal of the Stamp Act the Townshend Acts, introduced by Charles Townshend, were passed by Parliament in 1767. These acts included the Revenue Act 1767, passed June 26, 1767, which again placed a tax on paper, along with lead, glass and tea. In October the text of the Revenue Act was widely printed in newspapers, often with critical commentary, because like the Stamp Act, the new tax directly threatened the businesses and livelihoods of printers who relied on paper for printing, and lead for the founding of printing type. In particular the Act imposed import duties on sixty-seven grades of paper.

In little time newspapers such as the Boston Gazette and Pennsylvania Chronicle began publishing essays and articles, opposing the Townshend Acts. Among the most notable publications criticizing the Acts was a work entitled, Letters from a Farmer in Pennsylvania, written by John Dickinson, consisting of twelve letters, which were widely read and reprinted in many newspapers throughout the thirteen colonies, playing a major role in uniting the colonists against the Crown and Parliament and its persistent practice of taxation. William Goddard was the first printer to publish Dickinson's work, which proposed limiting Parliament's power, where he wrote that these essays "deserved the serious attention of all North-America". Dickinson's work was also published by printers such as David Hall and William Sellers. and were among the printers who employed their printing-presses to publicly challenge such acts. The new tax also increased incentives and efforts behind the founding of papermills in the colonies and for the colonists to produce their own commodities overall. However, in the following years leading up to the revolution, paper became scarce. The existing papermills were few in number and generally were small one or two-vat mills with limited output ability. As imports began to decline, the need for the colonists to produce their own goods increased dramatically. To conserve paper, newspapers were printed in the smallest practical size, with little room added for borders. In other cases weekly newspapers ceased publication because they simply could not make enough profit with the new taxes and resultant paper shortages.

== American Revolution ==
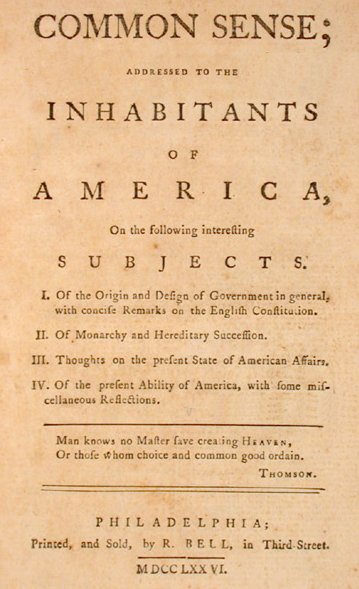
Common Sense, published by Thomas Paine in 1776, is considered the most influential work supporting the American Revolution.

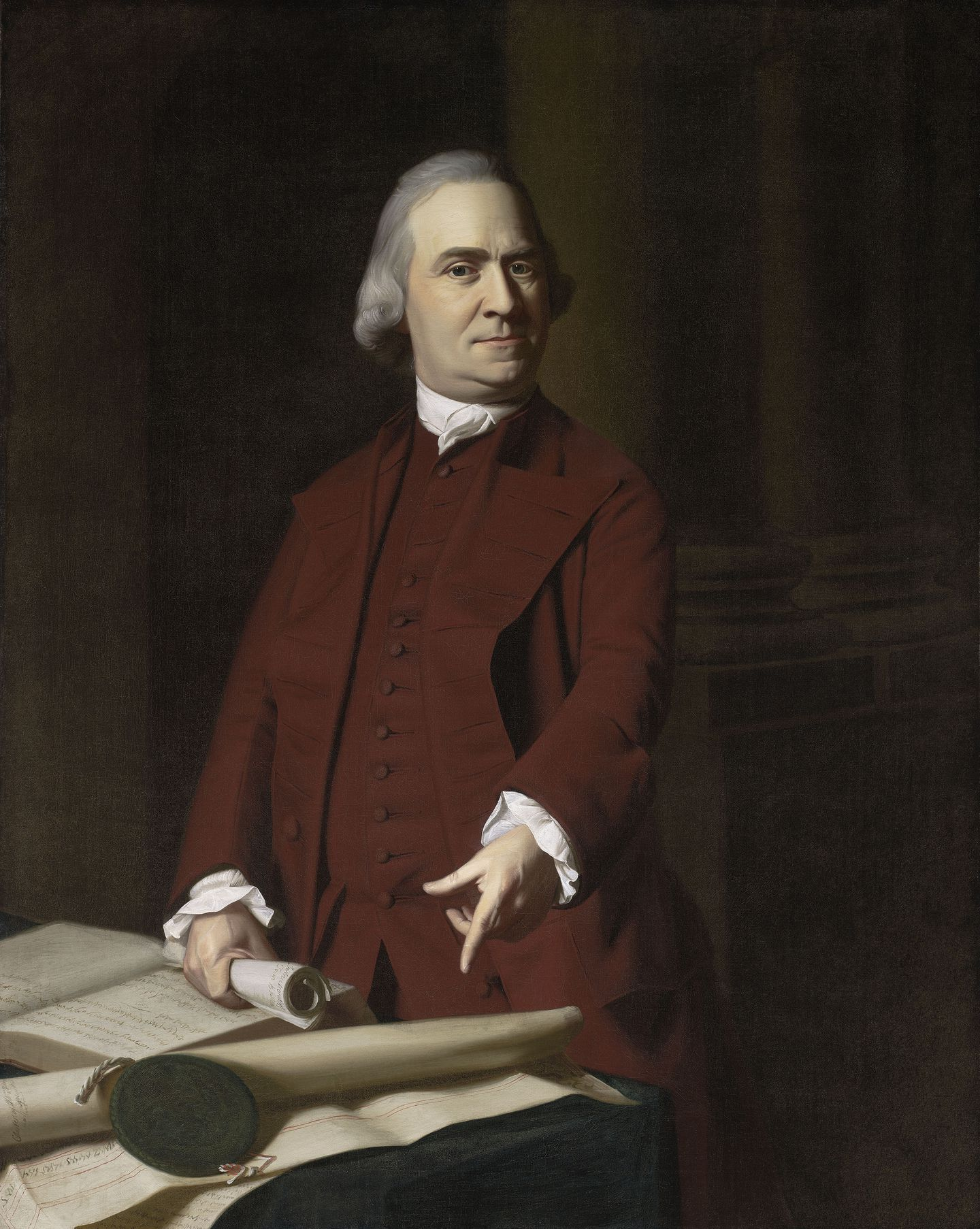
The revolutionary writings of Samuel Adams appeared in newspapers in the New England colonies.

One of the earliest historians of the American Revolution, David Ramsay, said that, "in establishing American independence, the pen and press had merit equal to that of the sword." In the years leading up to, and during the American Revolution, hundreds of pamphlets were printed covering a variety of themes about religion, common law, politics, natural rights and the enlightenment, which were largely written in relation to revolutionary thought. In his extensive work, Bernard Bailyn, (Note: Bernard Bailyn has won several awards, including two Pulitzer Prizes for history. (1968 and 1987)) a historian of colonial American history, he outlines how these pamphlets revealed an "interior view" of the motives behind the revolution and notes that they sometimes differ from the conventional views offered by some historians.

For years historians have debated as to the extent of influence that various religious doctrines had in fostering the ideals that ultimately brought about the American Revolution. However, it is evident that many religious works frequently offered accounts that promoted the ideals of freedom of speech and of the press, and other liberties, and openly criticized the British Crown over what they regarded as incursions on their God given rights and freedoms — issues that were fundamental in advancing the revolution. As such, the colonial authorities were always watchful of any statements that they felt were seditious that occurred within the context of published religious literature.

In the years prior to the Revolutionary War, Massachusetts played an influential role in supporting the Revolution. Boston was considered by royal authorities as a "hotbed of sedition". During this time printers and publishers played a fundamental role in promoting the call for independence in the and uniting the American colonies in that end. Thomas Paine's 1776 work, Common Sense, outlined moral and political arguments and is considered "the most incendiary and popular pamphlet of the entire revolutionary era", and was printed by Robert Bell. In response to Paine's work, James Chalmers, under the assumed name of Candidus (Note: Samuel Adams frequently used this pen name in his articles also.) countered it with a pamphlet entitled The Plain Truth, also printed by Robert Bell, which was not received well by a patriotic populace who drove Chalmers into exile.

The concepts of "Patriot" and "Loyalist" were not fully distinctive in many ways until 1774 when the idea of independence became the central political and social issue as tensions between the colonies and Britain intensified. Many printers embraced the idea of a free press doctrine that expected printers not to take sides, and allow for a "free and open press" in which a variety of political ideals could be freely and publicly debated.

Newspapers greatly helped to unite the individual colonies, each with their own cultures and religion, by appealing to their common interests of liberty. Before the ideals of independence and revolution came to be embraced among the colonists the differences in their settlements and forms of government, in religion, culture, trade and domestic policy, were so great that Benjamin Franklin, who well understood the situation, said, that nothing but the oppression of the entire country would ever unite them. To effect this he believed the colonists needed to appreciate the idea that their rights as men were far more important than the rights allowed in a particular colony. Samuel Adams also recognized this back in 1765 when he said that Americans as a whole would never unify and fight for independence "unless Great Britain shall exert her power to destroy their Libertys". Newspapers such as the Boston Gazette, which also printed the titles of new religious books, and the Massachusetts Spy, were fundamental in promoting the ideals that closed the religious, cultural and political gaps between the colonies.

Prior to the revolution printing was primarily confined to the capitals or larger cities of the various colonies. During the war, however, many printers and publishers set up their operations in other towns, making it less likely for their presses and shops to be confiscated or destroyed by British forces. After independence was finally established, by the peace of 1783, printing presses and newspapers multiplied very fast, not only in seaports, but in nearly all the principal inland villages and towns. There existed two primary types of print that influenced the political developments during the American Revolution: pamphlets and newspapers. Pamphlets became an important means for conveying revolutionary ideals during controversies between the colonists and the Crown. Often written by prominent writers under an assumed name they have been referred to by scholars as the principle agents of change during the revolutionary era.

At the outbreak of war at Lexington and Concord in April 1775, it became clearly evident that the Whigs dominated the press and postal networks and could use them to subvert Tory and Loyalist polemics. Printing and publication of Loyalist propaganda was subsequently confined to the various cities, ports and surrounding localities under British military control. After the Declaration of Independence was officially issued to the British Crown, only 15 Loyalist newspapers emerged at various times and places, but none of them managed to publish continuously in the instability and uncertainty of war from 1776 to 1783. British occupied New York City had the longest-lived and most-popular Loyalist newspapers, including Hugh Gaine's New-York Gazette and the Weekly Mercury. Others included The Massachusetts Gazette, the leading Tory newspaper, published by Richard Draper and Alexander Robertson's The Royal American Gazette, James Rivington's Royal Gazette, and William Lewis's New York Mercury. Rivington undoubtedly had sided with the British, while Gaine, typical of many loyalists from the lower colonies, felt equally sympathetic for colonial rights but harbored an aversion to open rebellion and violence. Neither of these printers became a partisan of the British cause the actual war had started, where British occupation of New York City made it nearly impossible to be neutral. After 1770, as colonial tensions with England mounted, the Loyalist newspapers lost most of their advertising sponsors.

Printers provided an invaluable service to various statesmen, notable patriot figures and the Continental Congress by disseminating their political and social views and other accounts before and during the war. In the autumn and winter of 1768 Samuel Adams of Boston was busy writing for various newspapers, mostly in the Boston Gazette. The Gazette functioned as his main voice, and as a rallying medium for patriot leaders. The newspaper was noted for its bitter, yet well written, accounts about the perceived injustices occurring in the colonies. Adams wrote fiery accounts about the revolutionary cause through this newspaper. Adams contributed a forceful letter of December 19, 1768, to this newspaper, and according to historian James Kendall Hosmer, it would "perhaps be impossible to find a better illustration of the superior political sense of the New Englanders". Through it Adams assailed the British Parliament over the issue of taxation without representation: i.e."When pressed with that fundamental principle of nature and the Constitution, that what is a man's own is absolutely his own, and that no man can have a right to take it from him without his consent". The office of the Boston Gazette on Court Street, also functioned as a meeting place for various revolutionary figures, including Joseph Warren, James Otis, (Note: Otis' well-known catch-phrase "Taxation without Representation is tyranny" became the basic Patriot position.) Josiah Quincy, John Adams, Benjamin Church, and other patriots scarcely less conspicuous. Many of these figures typically belonged to the Sons of Liberty. In those groups Samuel Adams emerged more and more the forcible and eminent figure, while his writings were also published in newspapers distant.

John Dunlap, the founder of The Maryland Gazette, was one of the most successful Irish/American printers of his era. He printed the first copies of the United States Declaration of Independence, and A Summary View of the Rights of British America, by Thomas Jefferson. In 1778, the Congress appointed Dunlap to print the Congressional Records, and for five years he continued in this capacity as their official printer. Dunlap and his partner David Claypoole printed the Articles of Confederation and swore to the Congress, "...that we will not disclose either directly or indirectly the contents of the said confederation."

Mathew Carey was one of a number of printers who fled to the American colonies to escape prosecution for printing and publication of the Volunteers Journal, a Dublin newspaper that promoted the anti-British Volunteer movement, which the British Crown at the time naturally considered seditious literature.

In 1777 the Continental Congress commissioned Mary Katherine Goddard to print copies of the Declaration of Independence for distribution among the colonies. Many of these copies were signed by John Hancock, President of the Congress, and Charles Thomson, Permanent Secretary, and are sought after by historians and collectors.

== Post Revolution ==
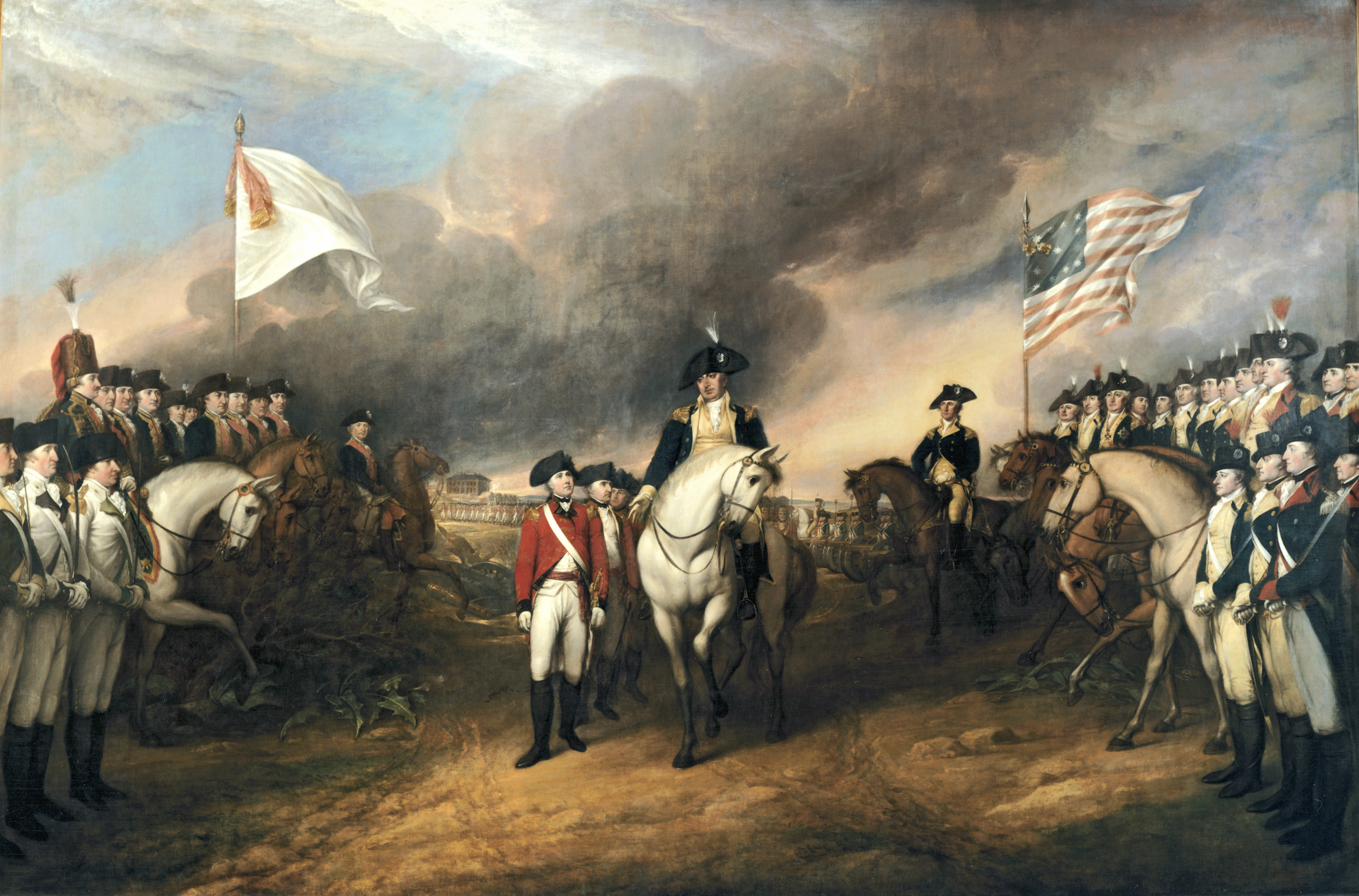
Surrender of Lord Cornwallis to General Washington at Yorktown

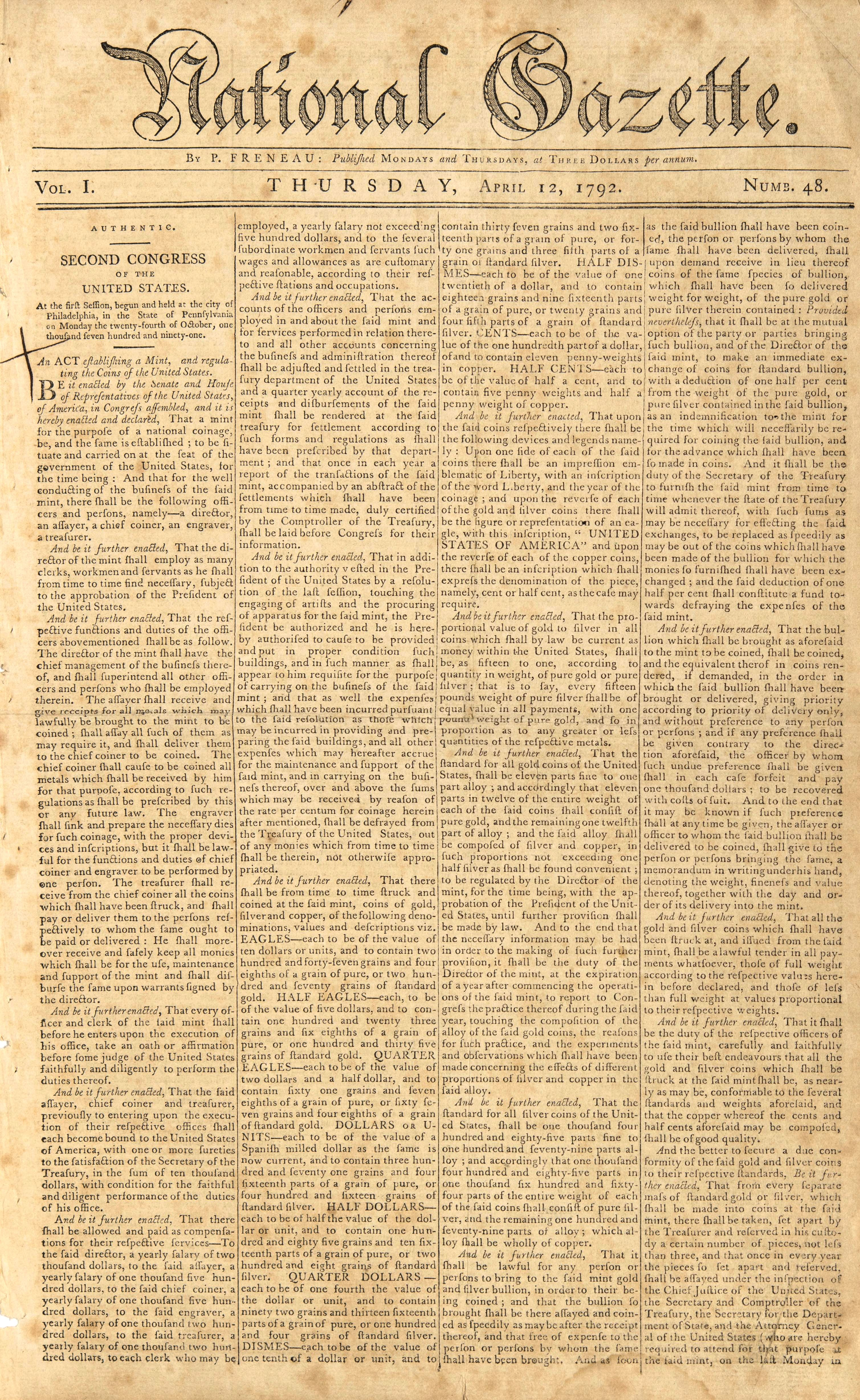
The April 12, 1792 issue of National Gazette

At the close of the Revolutionary War, the patriot victory at the Siege of Yorktown was well covered by both American and British newspapers before, during and after the campaign. In anticipation of the imminent siege, the Massachusetts Spy, only two weeks before the battle, on September 13, 1781, stated:

"It is not doubted but that his Excellency General Washington has marched, with 8000 choice troops including the French, to Virginia, where the troops in that quarter will join him; Lord Cornwallis is blocked up by the French fleet;—by the present appearance of things we are at the eve of some important event, which God grant may be propitious to the United States”.

After the patriot victory at Yorktown there were a flurry of newspaper reports in circulation covering the three-week-long campaign, with some reports still appearing months later as new information became available. The initial reports were based on accounts from various commanders. The account that appeared in the Independent Chronicle of April 19, 1781, though generally informative, was based on a report written in haste by Nathanael Greene who had incomplete knowledge of troop strengths and casualties. The report from Lord Cornwallis, which appeared in the London Chronicle, on June 7, 1781, was as much in error on several accounts. However, newspaper coverage featured many prominent commanders, while the general reports of the victory lifted the morale and hopes of the Americans, while it conversely did so for the British.

After the revolution it became increasingly clear that the newly found United States was in political disarray collectively and needed to unify under one central government. Under the Articles of Confederation the United States had little ability to defend its sovereignty in the international theater, having no political authority to summon state militia to join to fight a war. It also lacked the authority to levy taxes and was failing to bring unity to the diverse sentiments and interests of the individual states. Uniting the states to that end proved to be a politically complex difficult task, as many state politicians were more concerned with state sovereignty, and held the idea of a central authority in great reserve, having remembered the ordeals they faced from the British government. When the idea of a national constitution was proposed it was met with mixed reactions from federalists and anti-federalists who often made their voices heard through newspapers and pamphlets.

To convince the people of New York and other states that ratification of the U.S. Constitution was in their best interest, Alexander Hamilton, James Madison and John Jay wrote a series of essays entitled The Federalist Papers. When they were first printed in New York newspapers, they were anonymously signed Publius. Various essays began appearing in 1787 in New York's Daily Advertiser and The New York Packet. The Federalist articles were widely read and are often considered to have greatly influenced the ratification process and future American political institutions. The Federalist papers were challenged by the vigorous writings of Richard Henry Lee and Elbridge Gerry, which further demonstrated the importance of the press and its value in obtaining political ends. At this time John Fenno emerged as a Federalist Party editor through his newspaper, the Gazette of the United States, to which Alexander Hamilton contributed pro-federalist essays and money on a regular basis, and which lent great support for the Constitution and the emerging Federalist party.

On the anti-Federalist side, Philip Freneau was a strong voice through his newspaper, the National Gazette, which he established in 1791, during President Washington's first term. Freneau was encouraged by James Madison and the Secretary of State, Thomas Jefferson, to establish what became a partisan newspaper, to counter Federalist leaning newspapers. Since Jefferson had hired Freneau as a French translator at the Department of State it was assumed by various Federalists that Jefferson had played a role in authoring the political attacks made on Washington and his federalist colleagues in Freneau's Gazette, which Jefferson denied. Washington generally paid little mind to the litany of political machinations occurring in newspapers, however, he privately asked Jefferson for Freneau's removal from the State Department. Jefferson insisted that Freneau and his paper were sparing the country from turning into a virtual monarchy and managed to convince Washington to forgo his removal on the grounds that it would amount to an affront to Freedom of the Press, and would ultimately prove damaging to Washington and his administration. Both Fenno and Freneau became major figures in the history of American newspapers during the post revolution years and played leading roles in shaping the beginnings of party politics beginning in the 1790s.

In 1787, Dunlap was commissioned to make printed copies of the Constitution of the United States, on September 19, 1787, for review at the Constitutional Convention, and later published it for public review for the first time in The Pennsylvania Packet. (Note: From September 1777, to July 1778, when the British army was in possession of Philadelphia, the Packet was printed in Lancaster.) On April 30, 1789, George Washington took the oath of office as the first President of the United States in Federal Hall in New York City. After the swearing in ceremony Washington entered the Senate chamber and delivered the first presidential inaugural address. The entire event and speech was covered in an eyewitness report on May 6, 1789, in the Massachusetts Centinel. Towards the end of President Washington's second term he decided it was time to resign and declined offers to run for a third term. With the help of James Madison and Alexander Hamilton, Washington, now at the age of sixty-four, wrote his Farewell Address. He never read the Address publicly but had it published in newspapers in Philadelphia, which at the time was the capital of the United States. The Pennsylvania Packet and American Daily Advertiser was the first newspaper to carry the address in its issue of September 19, 1796. Before long the now famous Farewell Address was widely circulated and reprinted in many newspapers, including the New York Herald on September 21, 1796.

== Newspapers and the U.S. Constitution ==
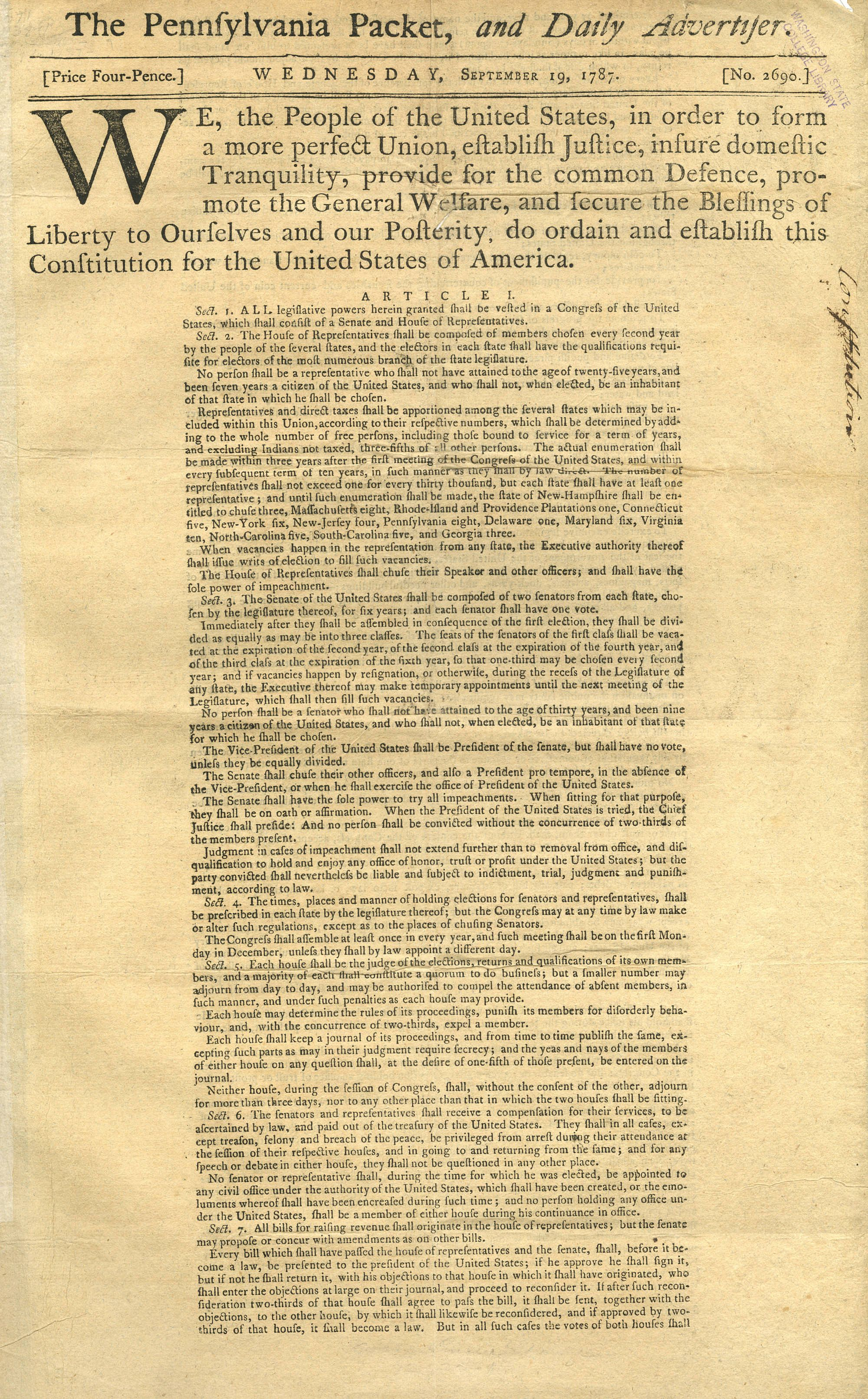
On September 17, 1787, The Pennsylvania Packet was the first to print the ratified U.S. Constitution. (page 1 of 4)

Before and after ratification of the U.S. Constitution, newspapers everywhere featured news and essays on the development and content of the Constitution. Editorials about its strengths and weaknesses were commonplace and often sparked or fueled the debates that commonly occurred in town meetings, as well as in streets, taverns, and homes.

While the proposed U.S. Constitution was being debated by Congressmen and other political figures, and during its ratification, many newspapers and pamphlets, mostly in support of the Constitution, reporters worked furiously in an effort to cover and report on the many details discussed. In the process the geographical and political differences began to emerge, dividing the press and much of the population into two political groups, i.e.The Federalists and Anti-Federalists. Several newspapers that had long supported the cause for American independence were now hoping to delay or even prevent the adoption of a Federal Constitution.

Approximately six newspapers published articles that were highly critical of the Constitution, mostly on the basis that it was another form of central government that would undermine the sovereignty of the states. Once such newspaper, The Boston Gazette, which previously lent strong support to the idea of American independence, was bitterly opposed to a Constitution. From that point on it slowly lost much of its patronage and went out of publication by 1798. Other newspapers maintained a politically neutral policy and allowed the publication of all points of view. The greater majority of newspapers, however, were in support of a Constitution and strong federal government and held the position that such a government would unite the states and ultimately make them stronger. The Massachusetts Spy of Boston supported a Constitution, but since it was located in an anti-federalist community it received much disfavor. Some supporting newspapers would, however, not allow any anti-federalist material to be published, which brought many complaints about attacks on the ideals of freedom of speech and freedom of the Press. Conversely, anti-federalists charged that their views and communications between the colonies were not being printed or delivered. During the winter of 1788, when the several states were debating ratification, various anti-federalists charged that the post office was keeping their newspapers from being delivered among the states and thus preventing delegates among the state conventions from reading their arguments against the Constitution. Subsequently, in 1789, during its first session under the new Constitution, Congress drafted and introduced a national Bill of Rights, to be incorporated into the Constitution, which stated that Congress would not be allowed to make any law "abridging the freedom of speech, or of the press."

Upon the adoption of the Constitution, various political leaders found that they needed their own public forum to express their views. In the process, they split into different parties about which the common citizen was generally uninformed. In an effort to persuade people to take sides on political issues, they founded partisan-like newspapers that offered little news and largely devoted itself in the effort support the various political doctrines of respective party leaders, rendering these publications as political tracts, rather than as sources of general news of interest to all.

After the Constitution was adapted, the floor of the Senate for the first several years was closed to reporters, journalists and other observers. Congress, on the other hand, invited any onlooker that the public gallery there would allow room for. The relationship between journalists and politicians, however, was not a congenial one. Reporters often complained that House members intentionally carried on, speaking quickly in an unending manner, and often turned their backs and didn't speak clearly, while reporters tried to scribble and record as much as they could in the process. Congressmen, in turn, charged that they were often being misquoted or had their statements intentionally twisted, leaving out key points of views, important names and the like. On September 26, 1789, members of the House began debating a resolution introduced by South Carolina representative Aedanus Burke, which accused newspapers of "misrepresenting these debates in the most glaring deviations from the truth" and for "throwing over the whole proceedings a thick veil of misrepresentation and error." Two days earlier, however, the House had approved the final draft of the First Amendment in the Bill of Rights that guaranteed journalists the right of freedom of the press. Another "irony" is that the details of the Congressional debates comes from those same reporters. The "single best resource" for the early proceedings, in The Annals of Congress was compiled from the accounts found in early newspapers.

The various debates during the ratification process, according to historian Richard B. Bernstein, revealed "the American people at their political and principled best, albeit occasionally at their factional worst". However, despite all the coverage and attention afforded by reporters and newspapers over the ratification it never received a comprehensive historical assessment on a state level, taken as a whole, until the twenty-first century. Much of the problem was due to the fact that various debates held in some states were never recorded, while the published debates of some were subject to the limited skills of reporters and their stenographers. Also, reporters often showed a lack of willingness to let speakers correct the wording of their speeches as they were being recorded, while many often exhibited a bias toward the Federalists, who often outsourced the authoring and publication of the speeches used during the debates. In the late 1980s James H. Hutson had outlined a list of problems with the records kept during the various state ratifying conventions. By the end of 2009, the Documentary History of the Ratification of the Constitution (DHRC) had published fourteen volumes on the ratification process in eight states, largely made up from, and by comparing, newspaper accounts of the time.

== Newspapers and the Alien and Sedition Acts ==
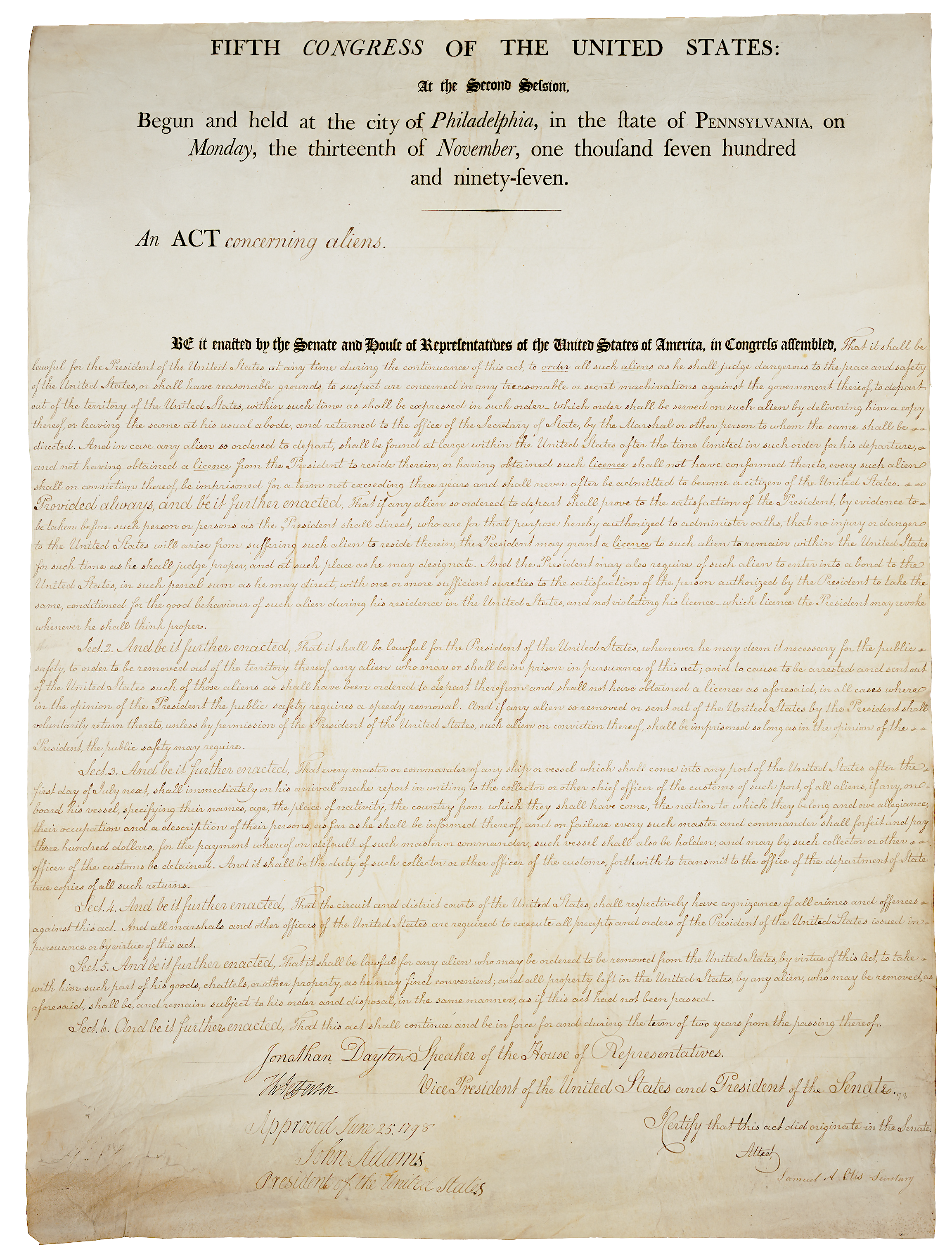
The original Alien and Sedition Acts, signed (Note: Transcripts of these documents can be read at the National Archives.)

The Alien and Sedition Acts were four laws were passed by the Fifth U.S. Congress under President John Adams in 1798 during the undeclared Quasi War with France, (Note: The Quasi War was an undeclared naval war with France from 1798 to 1800, and as such Congress could not authorize funding and military aid without a formal declaration of war.) with the claim that they were directed at the French and their sympathizers in the United States. Much of the impetus for passage of the Acts, however, was largely the result of partisan newspapers which were highly critical of President Adams and other federalists over their apparent eagerness to engage France in an actual declared War. The laws severely restricted public criticism of government officials, especially where newspapers were concerned, and curtailed citizenship requirements of aliens. The Democratic-Republicans assumed the laws were really a political ploy to silence the growing and frequent criticism that was occurring in the newspapers and during public debates and protests.

The Acts were mostly favored by the Federalists, resulting in the arrest and imprisonment of a number of newspaper editors, many of whom were highly critical of Adams' administration. However, even a critic of Thomas Jefferson, a staunch anti-federalist, was arrested and jailed. Washington, who was often censured by the anti-federalist press, also took exception to the Acts. The Acts also made it more difficult for an immigrant to become a citizen of the United States, via the Naturalization Act of 1790, requiring an immigrant fourteen years of residency to become a citizen, and was said to be aimed at French and Irish immigrants, potential citizens, in an effort to curb their influence for averting war with France. The Acts also allowed the president to imprison and deport anyone who wasn't a citizen who was deemed a threat to the nation's stability and security. The Federalists maintained that the bills would strengthened national security during a War with France. Critics of the Acts, especially newspaper editors via the press, claimed that they were primarily an attempt to silence anti-federalists newspapers and discourage voters who disagreed with the Federalist party, and that they violated the right of freedom of speech and freedom of the press, held in the First Amendment to the U.S. Constitution. In the attempt to bring reform to a near out of control press, the Acts only compounded and made matters worse.

In the face of these new laws, the freedoms enjoyed by the press, which once served to unite the colonies, now were being scrutinized by the government and soon became an engine of political division. Both Federalists and Republicans felt the newspapers were being exploited and used as a vehicle to promote political scandals and falsehoods over the truth in the political social arenas. Benjamin Franklin Bache, through his newspaper, the Philadelphia Aurora, published what were considered vicious attacks on the Federalist Party, and in particular, at President John Adams, and his predecessor George Washington, which almost resulted in riots in the streets of Philadelphia, and for which he was charged with libel. (Note: Bache was the grandson of Benjamin Franklin. He died of yellow fever before he ever stood trial for libel. Before he died he was assaulted by Clement Humphreys for his public attacks on George Washington.) Among other things, Bache through his newspaper accused Adams of being a war monger, a "tool of the British", and "a man divested of his senses", who was trying to instigate a war with France. His frequent newspaper attacks on a sitting president, along with others, are often regarded by historians as to have greatly contributed to the passage of the Alien and Sedition Acts. (Note: Adams in later years defended his actions claiming that the Acts were war measures at a time when there was much concern over enemies within the country who were sympathetic to France.)

In the November 22, 1798, issue of the Philadelphia Aurora, in reaction to the Acts, Bache published the following exclamation:

"Who would have believed it, had it been foretold, that the People of America,
after having fought seven long years to obtain their Independence, would, at this early day,
have been seized and dragged into confinement by their own government ..."

There were fourteen indictments for libel under the Acts, all of which were levied against Republicans, most of whom were newspaper editors. Pennsylvania Chief Justice Thomas McKean, in a 1798 libel case against William Cobbett, publisher of the Peter Porcupine's Gazette, in Philadelphia, which was widely considered a scandalous and inciteful publication, once remarked:

"Every one who has in him the sentiments either of a Christian or a gentleman cannot but be highly offended at the envenomed scurrility that has raged in pamphlets and newspapers printed in Philadelphia for several years past, insomuch that libelling has become a national crime, and distinguishes us not only from all the states around us, but from the whole civilized world.

Historian Douglas Bradburn maintains that popular history often holds that Thomas Jefferson and James Madison, the authors of the Kentucky and Virginia Resolutions, were the major opponents of the Alien and Sedition Acts, however, he also notes that while this is largely true, that idea by itself can be misleading, as the opposition to the Acts was wide spread and crossed political, religious and social lines.

The enforcement of the Acts, which were federal laws, directly brought into question the role of the right of states in defending the natural rights of people, which reflected the generally held attitudes about natural rights that emerged before and during the American Revolution. Opposition to the Acts quickly spread in most of the states during latter half of 1798, whose sentiments were shared and given added direction and magnitude by an ever increasing number of partisan newspapers which played a central role in voicing general dissent, and which instigated, largely an increasing number of public protests, which ultimately materialized in a national petition drive against the Act. At first signatures came slow, but as word spread they began coming in "streams and torrents", with thousands of signatures coming in from different states, and were "flooding the floor of Congress", much to the dismay of the Federalists.

Resistance to the Federalist's Acts began almost simultaneously in Virginia and Kentucky with the introduction of the Kentucky and Virginia Resolutions, written secretly by Jefferson and Madison respectively, whose precepts held that the Acts were unconstitutional and that the states had the right to regard them as null and void if they deemed it necessary. Word of the growing opposition that emerged in Kentucky's soon reached the eastern coastal states and was widely covered in their newspapers. Editor William Cobbet, however, derided the effort in his the Porcupines Gazette while condemning the Kentucky petitioners as uneducated backwoods farmers, no better than "savages", while the newspapers sympathetic to the Republicans heralded the idea that the Kentucky resolves clearly demonstrated that the founding principles of the Revolution were still quite alive in America. The Lexington Kentucky Gazette called for organized resistance to the Acts, and to the rush to war with France, before the laws had been enacted by calling for meetings, committees of correspondence, and general mobilization to take place on 4 July.

Jefferson went further than basing his opposition to the Acts simply on states rights and held up the idea of human rights foremost. (Note: Noted Jefferson historian Dumas Malone said that Jefferson "... took the most extreme states-rights position of his entire life" in his opposition to the Alien and Sedition Acts.) Within a week newspapers were publishing articles and proclamations about states and an individual rights and were widely circulated, asserting the idea that the people and the states had the right to defy laws they deemed unconstitutional. During 1798–1799 newspapers continued to give impetus to ideology that would deprive Adams of a second term, while to effect a reversal to the Federalist majorities established in Congress and many states, ending the centralization that had been designed by the Federalists, which brought about a virtual end to the Federalist Party, paving the way for the Republicans and Jefferson's presidency, with a corresponding increase in Republican leaning newspapers.

As opposition to the Alien and Sedition Acts steadily increased among the general public, it contributed in significant measure to Jefferson's defeat over Adams, resulting in the Democratic-Republican Party gaining a significant majority in the Congress during the presidential election in 1800. The new Congress never renewed the Act, which was allowed to expire on March 3, 1801, under its own provisions. President Jefferson, who had always insisted that the Acts were an affront to freedom of speech, and of the press, granted a series of pardons to all those presumed guilty of sedition and libel under this Act, an advent that greatly strengthened the idea of freedom of the press in the courts and in the eyes of public.

== Printing presses and type ==
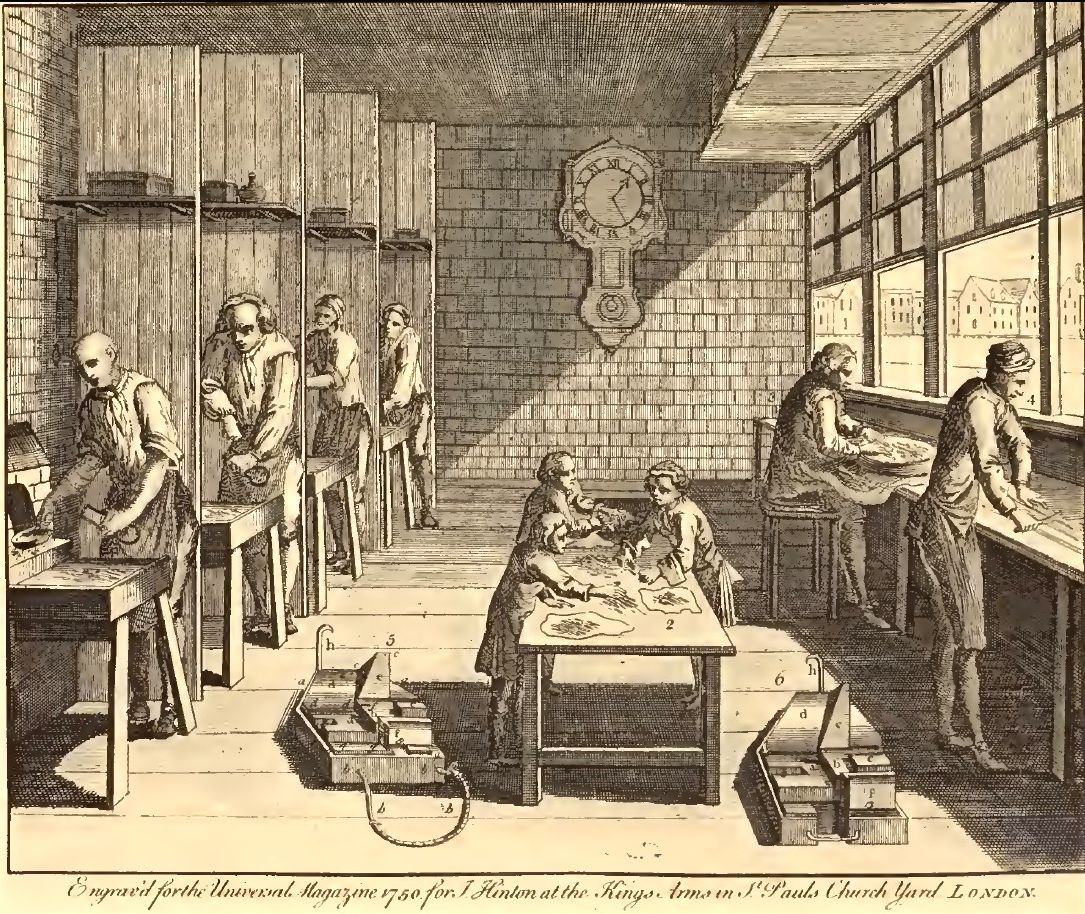
Workers casting type in William Caslon's foundry in 1750. On the floor, many times enlarged, are the two halves of a type mold.

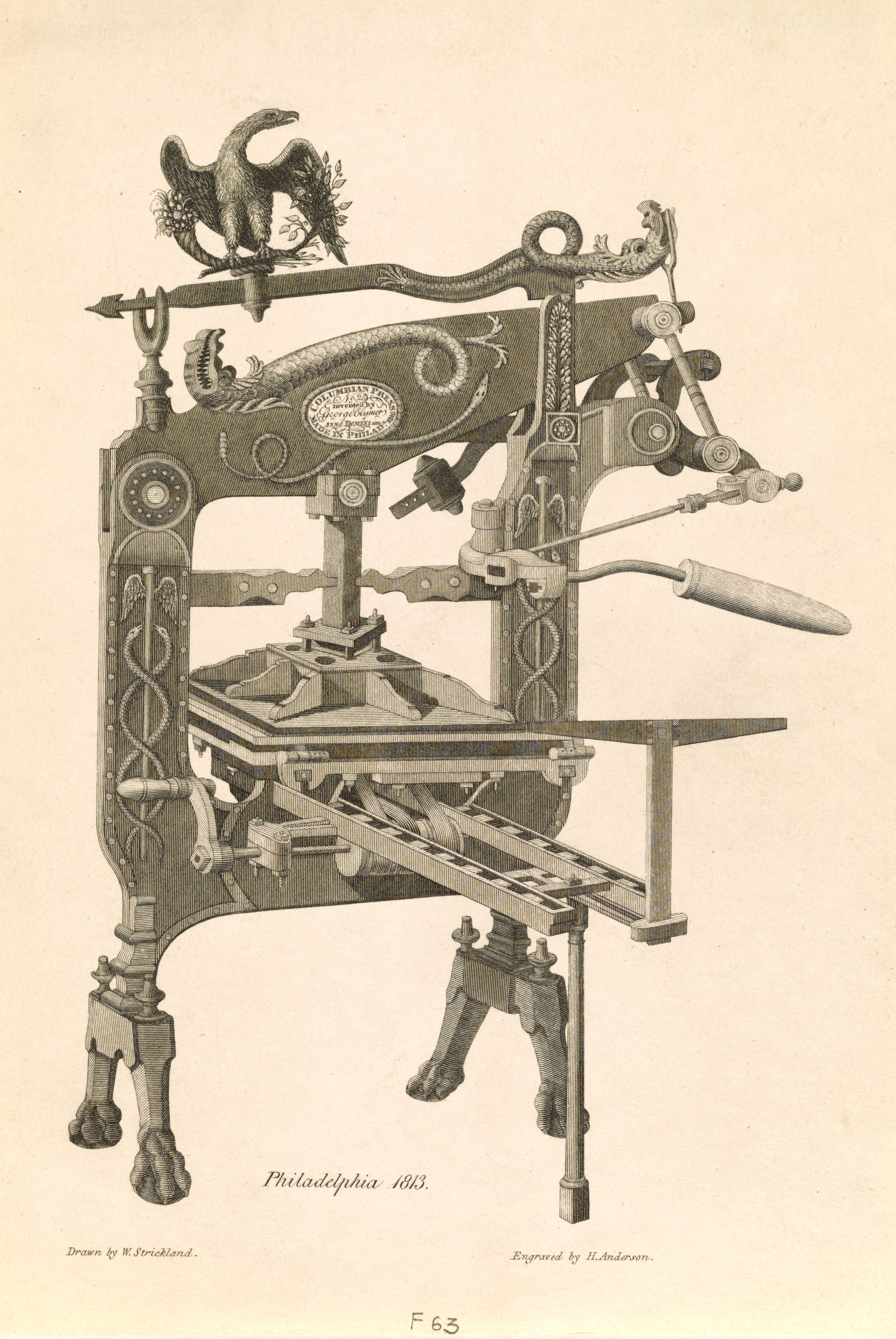
Columbian press by George Clymer

The art of printing goes back to around A. D. 175, where it was employed by the Chinese, who cut impressions into blocks of wood, applied ink, laid paper over the block and pressed the two together, leaving the inked impression on the paper. This crude method of printing took root in other parts of the world, but didn't change much until the 1100s. Then, around 1440, German inventor Johannes Gutenberg invented and developed movable type, where individual letters, usually engraved into lead, could be rearranged for new word configurations with ease. This change revolutionized the printing process and the printing trade as a whole. (Note: Accounts vary, and controversy over whether it was Gutenberg or Laurens Janszoon Coster who invented moveable type has existed for hundreds of years.) Since much of Europe used a twenty-four letter alphabet derived from the Roman and Greek alphabets, the task of printing of new material was drastically simplified, as compared to many other languages with alphabets consisting of thousands of individual ideographs.

Before a printer could realistically consider going into the printing business, the finances required to purchase a printing press, and type, had to be secured. Both of these necessities were expensive and not always easily obtainable. Up until the middle of the 18th century, the printing presses employed in the colonies were imported from England. The difficulty of machining the large iron screw, essential to the operation of pressing the paper over the type, left no choice for the American printer but to purchase them from abroad, which added to the costs considerably and made it more difficult for new printers to establish themselves. Isaac Doolittle, a clock maker and a man of many crafts, built the first printing press and screw made on American soil in 1769, which was purchased by William Goddard.

The first types appeared in the colonies from type foundries in Holland and England. Some notable type founders and type designers included William Caslon (1693–1766), and John Baskerville (1707–1775), both leading printers in England during their day. Their typefaces greatly influenced the evolution of English type design and were first to establish an English national typographic style, which ultimately impacted printing style in the English-American colonies. While in Europe, Benjamin Franklin had purchased many hundreds of pounds of type from the Caslon family for his presses in Philadelphia and other cities. His first use of Caslon type was employed in the printing of The Pennsylvania Gazette in 1738.Caslon typefaces quickly became popular among colonial printers in the mid-18th century up to the American Revolution. Books, newspapers and broadsides were mostly printed in Caslon old style types, while many important works were also printed with newer Caslon types, including the first printed version of the Declaration of Independence, by John Dunlap in 1776.

Foundries for producing type didn't appear in the colonies until well into the 18th century, and it wasn't until 1775 where type overall became practically obtainable in a variety of print types. Historian Lawrence C. Wroth, in his 1938 work, The Colonial Printer, comparatively outlines the various sorts of print type that were available in the late 1600s up until 1770. In the Germantown section of present-day Philadelphia, the first regular foundry for casting type was built by Christopher Sower, (Note: Also spelled as Sauer) in 1772. However, its type implements were sent over from Germany and were intended solely for the production of German types.

As with printing presses and newspapers, there were laws regulating the number of foundries that were allowed to produce type in England. In 1637, a Star Chamber Decree mandated that only four persons in England should be allowed to operate a letter foundry at any given time, where each foundry was limited to the number of apprentices it could have. By 1693, however, the decree had expired, but the number of foundries nonetheless never increased in any significant measure. Even English printers often found themselves seeking type from Dutch foundries. Subsequently, no printing presses existed in the colonies until the first press arrived at Cambridge, brought over from London in 1639. In the colonies, as in England, much of the type used by printers came from Dutch foundries. Many examples of Dutch type exist in the printed works produced in the colonies from 1730 to 1740.

By the turn of the 18th-19th centuries printing press manufacturing in America had increased greatly, with new innovations and improvements being made to printing presses, which previously had not changed in their basic design for more than a hundred years. Press makes like Adam Ramage and George E. Clymer were among the most prominent and significant press makers during this time. Ramage had produced 1,250 printing presses in his lifetime, which saw wide use throughout most of the states. Clymer innovated the Columbian press, an ornate iron press which was capable of printing one whole newspaper page with a single pull.

=== Bookbinding ===
Bookbinders also played an important role in the printing and publishing trade. Unlike newspapers and pamphlets, after the printing of volumeous works had been performed the numerous pages had to be bound into a book, which was accomplished by means of a bookbinding press and the special skill required by a bookbinder. The first book on record printed on an American printing-press needing the services of a bookbinder was The Whole Book of Psalms, published at Cambridge in 1640. John Ratcliff of the seventeenth century is the first identifiable bookbinder in colonial America, credited for binding Eliot's Indian Bible in 1663.

Some booksellers and publishers, like William Parks, Isaiah Thomas, and Daniel Henchman performed their own bookbinding; however, bookbinders in general were an obscure lot and were generally not known by name for the works they bound. There were very few exceptions where bookbinder's names were included in the inscription along with the printer on the title page or inside cover. A few books bound by Andrew Barclay of Boston provide a few of the known examples of works containing the bookbinder's name on a trade label.

=== Paper production in the colonies ===
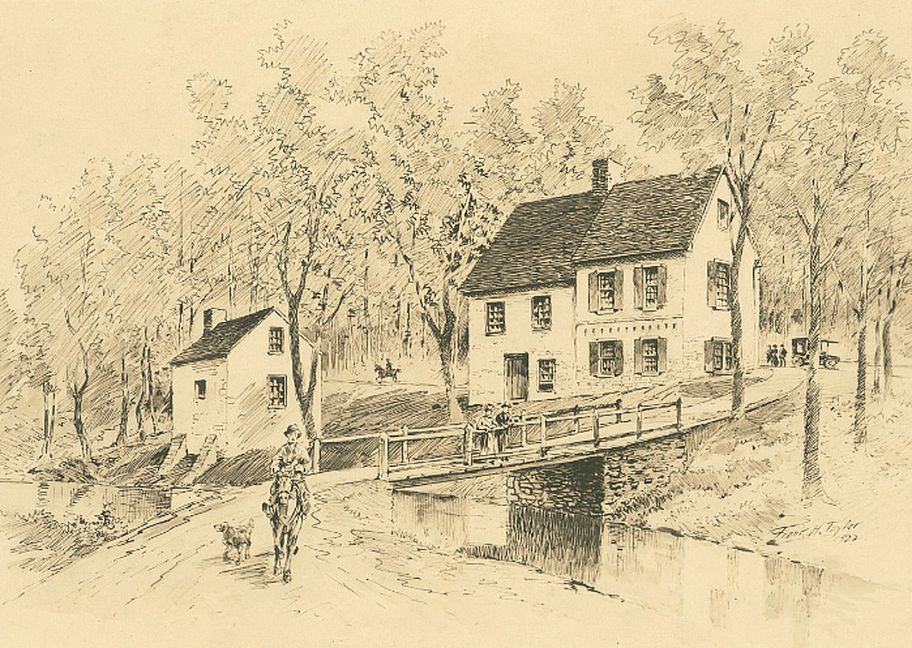
William Rittenhouse established America's first paper mill at Monoshone Creek in the Province of Pennsylvania in 1690.

The manufacturing of paper was essential to the printing and publishing industry, and brought many people together to help in the effort to collect linen rags used in the production of paper. Because there were no newspapers in the colonies before 1700 paper was not yet a vital commodity in high demand. Books were uncommon and usually brought over from abroad. The first printing presses were established in Cambridge, in the Massachusetts Bay colony in 1638, and others soon emerged in New York, Boston and Philadelphia, but the overall production of printed matter was small. As the 18th century unfolded more printing presses and newspapers came into existence and soon the paper shortage was felt by printers.

William Rittenhouse in partnership with William Bradford, established the first paper mill in colonial America in 1690, on the Monoshone Creek, a tributary to the Wissahickon Creek just north of Philadelphia. It was the only paper mill in the colonies for twenty years. The Rittenhouse family also built other papers mills, their last being built in 1770.

The second paper mill in America was erected by another settler of Germantown named William De Wees, who was a brother-in-law of Nicholas Rittenhouse, William's son who had been an apprentice at the Rittenhouse mill. The third paper mill to emerge was established by Thomas Wilcox on Chester Creek, in Delaware County, 20 miles from Philadelphia. Wilcox had sought employment working at Rittenhouse's paper mill, but the paper production was still young and business was slow. After some years of saving money he managed to start up his own paper mill in 1729 Through the efforts of Daniel Henchman, the first paper mill to appear north of New Jersey was in 1729 at Milton on the Neponset River. The shortage still worsened, however, in the years approaching the American Revolution, and became serious when the war finally broke out. Benjamin Franklin and William Parks established a paper mill in Williamsburg, Virginia, in 1742, the first in the Virginia colony. Prior to 1765 most of the paper used by the colonial printers had to be imported from England, as the existing colonial paper mills, mostly located in Pennsylvania, were not able to provide enough to meet the demands of the growing colonies.

Benjamin Franklin was active in organizing the collection of rags used for paper making. His sales of this material to paper makers, along with his sales of paper to colonial printers, took on great proportions. In the process his contributions and advisory capacity proved him to be a major factor in colonial paper making and its trade. Franklin took a particular interest in the paper production in the colonies, and especially in Pennsylvania, and is credited for starting up 18 paper mills in that province. Subsequently, Delaware county in Pennsylvania, became the paper-mill center in the latter years of the 18th century. Franklin as a writer often wrote at length about the importance of paper making and how it was integral to the printing and publishing industry. In June 1788, he read a treatise before the American Philosophical Society in Philadelphia entitled, "Description of the Process to be Observed in Making Large Sheets of Paper in the Chinese Manner, with one Smooth Surface."

When the colonial assemblies passed nonimportation agreements in 1769, which followed the passage of the Stamp Act in 1765 and the Townshend Acts in 1767, the shortage soon became serious. By 1775, the existing supply of imported paper was nearly exhausted, and the 53 colonial paper mills soon proved to be inadequate to meet the demand for paper. The situation prompted the colonial governments, and even the Continental Congress, to take action to augment the output of paper. Various newspapers also rose to the occasion and rallied many of the colonists to help in the effort to produce paper. Newspapers such as the Pennsylvania Gazette and the Virginia Gazette published articles that outlined the need for this essential raw material and appealed to the general public to collect linen rags, offering them a bonus in addition to their value to persons bringing in the greatest annual quantity of the badly needed material. Eventually, paper would be produced from saw dust, but this and other major innovations in paper making did not occur until the 1790s.

"Laid paper" and "wove paper"
The three main elements absolutely required for printing and publishing were the printing press, ink and paper. At times, any of these items could be difficult to acquire—especially paper, which required a paper mill and a skilled crew to manufacture it. The paper produced in the American colonies throughout the greater part of the eighteenth century was a variety known as "laid paper", in distinction to the "wove" paper that came into use late in that century. When held up to the light, laid paper revealed innumerable fine lines running the length of the sheet, crossed at intervals of about an inch by the coarser lines, called "chain" lines — impressions formed by the bottom of the mold, where fine wires extended from end to end, which were held firmly in place by coarse wires that cross the mold from side to side. It was not until 1757 that the British type designer John Baskerville invented his "wove paper", produced by a mold composed of tightly woven fine brass wires, which produced a much smoother paper, that lacked the wire lines and chain lines found in laid paper. The smoother paper allowed for a more distinct and clearer printing result. Wove paper was regularly in use in England soon after its invention and became popular with the printers who produced fine books. In 1777 Benjamin Franklin acquired some of this wove paper and brought it with him to France where he introduced it to various persons there. By 1782, it was being successfully manufactured in that country. Wove paper thereafter was soon being produced in the paper mills of the now independent United States. The earliest known use is found in examples by Isaiah Thomas in Worcester, in 1795, whereafter it soon came into use by most American printers.

== Prominent early American printers and publishers ==
- Jane Aitken 1764–1832
- Robert Aitken (publisher) 1734–1802
- Thomas Allen (printer and publisher)] 1755-1826
- Francis Bailey (publisher) 1744—1817
- Robert Bell (publisher) 1725–1784
- Andrew Bradford 1686–1742
- William Bradford (printer, born 1663) 1660–1752
- William Bradford (printer, born 1719) 1719–1791
- John Campbell (editor) 1653–1728
- Samuel Campbell (printer and publisher) 1765-1836
- Mathew Carey 1760–1839
- John Carter (printer) 1745–1814
- Francis Childs (printer) (1763–1830)
- Isaac Collins (printer) 1746–1817
- James Davis (printer) (1721–1785)
- John Day (printer) 1522–1584
- Stephen Daye 1594–1668
- Gregory Dexter (1610–1700)
- Thomas Dobson (printer) 1751–1823
- John Dunlap 1747–1812
- Benjamin Edes 1732–1803
- John Fenno 1751–1798
- Thomas Fleet (printer) (1685–1758)
- John Foster (printer) (1648–1681)
- Daniel Fowle (printer) 1715–1787
- Benjamin Franklin 1705–1790
- James Franklin (printer) 1697–1735
- Philip Freneau (1752–1832)
- Hugh Gaine — 1726–1807
- Sarah Updike Goddard 1701–1770
- Mary Katherine Goddard 1738–1816
- William Goddard (publisher) 1740–1817
- Bartholomew Green Sr. (printer) 1666–1732
- Samuel Green (printer) 1614–1702
- Jonas Green early 1700s–1767
- David Hall (printer) 1714–1772
- Nicholas Hasselbach (1749–1769)
- Anthony Haswell (printer) 1756–1816
- Daniel Henchman (publisher) 1689–1761
- Robert Hodge (printer and publisher)] 1746-1813
- John Holt (publisher) 1721–1784
- James Humphreys (printer) 1748–1810
- William Hunter (publisher) early 1700s–1761
- Marmaduke Johnson 1628-1674
- Samuel Keimer 1689–1742
- Samuel Kneeland (printer) 1696–1769
- Samuel Loudon (1727–1813)
- Hugh Meredith 1697–1749
- James Parker (publisher) 1714–1770
- William Parks (publisher) 1699–1750
- Richard Pierce (publisher) ?-1691
- Alexander Purdie (publisher) 1743–1779
- William Rind 1733–1773
- Clementina Rind 1740–1774
- James Rivington 1724–1802
- Joseph Royle (publisher) 1732–1766
- Benjamin Russell (journalist) 1761–1845
- Christopher Sower (elder) 1693–1758
- Christopher Sower (younger) 1721–1784
- Christopher Sower III 1754–1799
- Solomon Southwick (1773–1839)
- William Strahan (publisher) 1715–1785
- Isaiah Thomas (publisher) 1749–1831
- Ann Timothy 1727–1792
- Elizabeth Timothy 1700–1757
- Louis Timothee 1699–1738
- Peter Timothy 1724–1782
- Benjamin Towne mid 1700s–1793
- William Williams (printer and publisher) 1787–1850
- Thomas Whitemarsh (printer) (? – 1733)
- John Peter Zenger 1697–1746

== See also ==
- History of printing
- History of journalism
- History of American newspapers
- History of newspaper publishing
- Newspapers in the United States
- Colonial history of the United States
- Bibliography of Early American publishers and printers
- Newspapers of colonial America
- Early American currency
- Robert Moffat (missionary),— First to translate and print the Bible in a mission in Africa.

== Bibliography ==
- Adelman, Joseph M. (December 2010). "A Constitutional Conveyance of Intelligence, Public and Private": The Post Office, the Business of Printing, and the American Revolution". Enterprise & Society. 11 (4). Cambridge University Press: 711–754. doi:10.1093/es/khq079. JSTOR 23701246.
- —— (Fall 2013). "Trans-Atlantic Migration and the Printing Trade in Revolutionary America". Early American Studies. 11 (3). University of Pennsylvania Press: 516–544. doi:10.1353/eam.2013.0026. JSTOR 23547682. S2CID 144423922.
- Andrilk, Todd (2012). Reporting the Revolutionary War : before it was history, it was news. Naperville, Ill.: Sourcebooks. ISBN 978-1-4022-69677.
- Ashley, Perry J. (1985). American newspaper journalists, 1690-1872. Detroit, MI : Gale Research Company. ISBN 978-0-8103-17215.
- Bailyn, Bernard (1967). The ideological origins of the American Revolution. Cambridge: Belknap Press of Harvard University Press. ISBN 9780674443013.
- Bailyn, Bernard; Hench, John B., eds. (1981) [1980]. The Press & the American Revolution. Boston: Northeastern University Press (Originally published: Worcester, Mass.: American Antiquarian Society). ISBN 978-0-9303-50307. (Google book)
- Baldwin, Ernest H. (1902). "Joseph Galloway, the Loyalist Politician (continued)". The Pennsylvania Magazine of History and Biography. 26 (3). University of Pennsylvania Press: 289–321. JSTOR 20086036.
- Bernstein, Richard B. (April 2012). "Ratification's Pathfinder, with Some Hints for Future Explorations". The William and Mary Quarterly. 69 (2). Omohundro Institute of Early American History and Culture: 377–381. doi:10.5309/willmaryquar.69.2.0377. JSTOR 10.5309/willmaryquar.69.2.0377.
- Berthold, Arthur Benedict (1970). American colonial printing as determined by contemporary cultural forces, 1639-1763. New York: B. Franklin. ISBN 978-0-8337-02616.
- Bradburn, Douglas (July 2008). "A Clamor in the Public Mind: Opposition to the Alien and Sedition Acts". The William and Mary Quarterly. 65 (3). Omohundro Institute of Early American History and Culture: 565–600. JSTOR 25096814.
- Bradsher, Earl Lockridge (1912). Mathew Carey, editor, author and publisher; a study in American literary development. New York: The Columbia University Press.
- Bralier, Jerald C.; Mead, Sidney E.; Bellah, Robert N. (1976). Bralier, Jerald C. (ed.). Religion and the American revolution. Philadelphia: Fortress Press. ISBN 978-0-8006-12412.
- Brigham, Clarence Saunders (May 1936). "James Franklin and the Beginnings of Printing in Rhode Island". Proceedings of the Massachusetts Historical Society. 65. Massachusetts Historical Society: 535–544. JSTOR 25080308.
- Buckingham, Joseph Tinker (1850). Specimens of newspaper literature : with personal memoirs, anecdotes, and reminiscences. Vol. I. Boston: Charles C. Little and James Brown.
- Buckingham, Joseph Tinker (1850). Specimens of newspaper literature : with personal memoirs, anecdotes, and reminiscences. Vol. II. Boston: Charles C. Little and James Brown.
- Burgan, Michael (2005). The Stamp Act of 1765. Minneapolis, Minn.: Compass Point Books. ISBN 978-0-7565-08463.
- Burns, Eric (2007). Infamous Scribblers: The Founding Fathers and the Rowdy Beginnings of American Journalism. Public Affairs, (of Perseus Books). ISBN 978-1-5864-85436.
- Clark, Charles E. (June 1991). "Boston and the Nurturing of Newspapers: Dimensions of the Cradle, 1690-1741". The New England Quarterly. 64 (2). The New England Quarterly, Inc.: 243–271. doi:10.2307/366123. JSTOR 366123.
- Cobb, Sanford H. (1902). The rise of religious liberty in America: a history. New York: Macmillan.
- Carroll, Hugh F. Carroll (1907). Printers and printing in Providence, 1762–1907. Providence Typographical Union. No. 33.
- Cogley, Richard W. (Summer 1991). "John Eliot and the Millennium". Religion and American Culture: A Journal of Interpretation. 1 (2). University of California Press on behalf of the Center for the Study of Religion and American Culture: 227–250. JSTOR 1123872.
- De Normandie, James (July 1912). "John Eliot, the Apostle to the Indians". The Harvard Theological Review. 5 (3). Cambridge University Press on behalf of the Harvard Divinity School: 349–370. doi:10.1017/S0017816000013559. hdl:2027/nnc2.ark:/13960/t2m68w501. JSTOR 1507287. S2CID 162354472.
- Dickens, Arthur Geoffrey (1964). The English Reformation. New York: Schocken Books.
- Dickerson, O. M. (December 1951). "British Control of American Newspapers on the Eve of the Revolution". The New England Quarterly. 24 (4). The New England Quarterly, Inc.: 453–468. doi:10.2307/361338. JSTOR 361338.
- Duniway, Clyde Augustus (1906). The development of freedom of the press in Massachusetts. Vol. XII. New York: Longmans.
- Dyer, Alan (1982). A biography of James Parker, colonial printer. Troy, N.Y.: Whitston Pubublishing Company. ISBN 9780878752027.
- Duniway, Clyde Augustus (1906). The development of freedom of the press in Massachusetts. New York: Longmans.
- Eldridge, Larry D. (1994). A distant heritage : the growth of free speech in early America. New York University Press. ISBN 978-0-5853-26580. (Google book)
- —— (July 1995). "Before Zenger: Truth and Seditious Speech in Colonial America, 1607–1700". The American Journal of Legal History. 39 (3). Oxford University Press: 337–358. doi:10.2307/845791. JSTOR 845791.
- Eliot, John (2003). The Eliot Tracts: With Letters from John Eliot to Thomas Thorowgood and Richard Baxter. Greenwood Publishing Group. ISBN 978-0-3133-0488-0.
- Encyclopedia Britannica (2007). Founding Fathers: The Essential Guide to the Men Who Made America. John Wiley & Sons. ISBN 978-0-470-11792-7.
- Fallows, Samuel (1903). Samuel Adams. Milwaukee: H. G. Campbell publishing co.
- Ferling, John E. (1996). John Adams : a life. New York: Henry Holt & Co. ISBN 978-0-8050-45765.
- Ferguson, Lorraine; Scott, Douglass (1990). "A Time Line of American Typography". Design Quarterly (148). Walker Art Center: 25–54. doi:10.2307/4091232. JSTOR 4091232.
- Ford, Thomas K. (1958). Printer in Eighteenth Century Williamsburg: An Account of His Life and Times and of His Craft. Colonial Williamsburg, Virginia: Colonial Williamsburg Foundation. ISBN 978-0-9104-12209. Google book
- Frank, Willard Chabot Jr. (April 1962). Rousing a Nation: The Virginia Gazette and the Growing Crisis 1773–1774 (Master of Arts). College of William & Mary. "A Thesis Presented to The Faculty of the Department of History, The College of William and Mary in Virginia"
- Frasca, Ralph (2006). Benjamin Franklin's printing network : disseminating virtue in early America. University of Missouri Press. ISBN 978-0-8262-16144.
- —— (May 2006). "The Emergence of the American Colonial Press". Pennsylvania Legacies. 6 (1). University of Pennsylvania Press: 11–15. JSTOR 27765021.
- Furtwangler, Albert (1984). The Authority of Publius: A Reading of the Federalist Papers. Cornell University Press. ISBN 978-0-8014-16439.
- Gloege, Timothy E. W. (March 2013). "The Trouble with "Christian History": Thomas Prince's "Great Awakening"". Church History. 82 (1). Cambridge University Press: 125–165. doi:10.1017/S0009640712002545. JSTOR 23358908. S2CID 162507290.
- Granger, Bruce Ingham (Winter 1956). "The Stamp Act in Satire". American Quarterly. 8 (4). The Johns Hopkins University Press: 368–384. doi:10.2307/2710447. JSTOR 2710447.
- Green, Samuel Abbott (1909). John Foster, The Earliest American Engraver and the First Boston Printer. Massachusetts Historical Society.
- Halperin, Terri Diane (2016). The Alien and Sedition Acts of 1798 : when a Congressional majority assaulted immigrants and civil liberties. Baltimore: Johns Hopkins University Press. ISBN 978-1-4214-19695.
- Hamburger, Philip (February 1985). "The Development of the Law of Seditious Libel and the Control of the Press; Historical Perspectives on the Free Press". Stanford Law Review. 37 (3): 661–765. JSTOR 1228713.
- Hamilton, Milton W. (1936). The Country Printer. Columbia University Press.
- Harlan, Robert D. (1974). "David Hall and the Townshend Acts". The Papers of the Bibliographical Society of America. 68 (1). The University of Chicago Press on behalf of the Bibliographical Society of America: 19–38. doi:10.1086/pbsa.68.1.24302418. JSTOR 24302418. S2CID 163738868.
- Hildeburn, Charles Swift Riché (1885). A century of printing: The issues of the press in Pennsylvania, 1685–1784. Philadelphia: Press of Matlack & Harvey.
- —— (1895). Sketches of printers and printing in colonial New York. New York: Dodd, Mead, & Company.
- Hosmer, James Kendall (1899). Samuel Adams. Boston, New York: Houghton, Mifflin and company.
- Hudson, Frederic (1873). Journalism in the United States, from 1690 to 1872. New York: Harper & Brothers.
- Huebner, Francis C. (1906). "Our Postal System". Records of the Columbia Historical Society, Washington, D.C. 9. Historical Society of Washington, D.C.: 126–174. JSTOR 40066939.
- Humphrey, Carol Sue (2013). The American Revolution and the Press: The Promise of Independence. Northwestern University Press. doi:10.2307/j.ctv47wcc8. ISBN 978-0-8101-26503. JSTOR j.ctv47wcc8.
- Hurst, Neal Thomas (2012). Andrilk, Todd (ed.). Reporting the Revolutionary War : before it was history, it was news. Sourcebooks. ISBN 978-1-4022-69677.
- Isaacson, Walter (2003). Benjamin Franklin: An American Life. New York: Simon & Schuster. ISBN 9780743258074.
- Irvin, Benjamin H. (June 2003). "Tar, Feathers, and the Enemies of American Liberties, 1768–1776". The New England Quarterly. 76 (2). The New England Quarterly, Inc.: 197–238. doi:10.2307/1559903. JSTOR 1559903.
- Jenkins, David (April 2001). "The Sedition Act of 1798 and the Incorporation of Seditious Libel into First Amendment Jurisprudence". The American Journal of Legal History. 45 (2). Oxford University Press: 154–213. doi:10.2307/3185366. JSTOR 3185366.
- Jensen, Merrill (1968). The founding of a nation : a history of the American Revolution, 1763-1776. New York: Oxford University Press.
- Johannesen, Stanley K. (1975). "John Dickinson and the American Revolution". Historical Reflections. 2 (1): 29–49. JSTOR 41298658.
- Kidd, Thomas S. (2017). Benjamin Franklin: The Religious Life of a Founding Father. Yale University Press. ISBN 978-0-3002-17490.
- Johnson, Rossiter; Brown, John Howard (1904). The twentieth century biographical dictionary of notable Americans. Vol. V. Boston: The Biographical Society.
- Kimber, Sidney A. (1937). The story of an old press : an account of the hand press known as the Stephen Daye press, upon which was begun in 1638 the first printing in British North America. Cambridge, Mass.: University Press.
- King, John N. (1999). "The book-trade under Edward VI and Mary". King, The book-trade under Edward VI and Mary I. The Cambridge History of the Book in Britain. Vol. 3. Cambridge University Press. pp. 164–178. doi:10.1017/CHOL9780521573467.009. ISBN 978-1-1390-5364-8. Archived from the original on September 24, 2021.
- Lee, James Melvin (1923). History of American journalism. Boston, New York: Houghton Mifflin Company.
- Leonard, Eugenie Andruss (October 1950). "Paper as a Critical Commodity during the American Revolution". The Pennsylvania Magazine of History and Biography. 74 (4). University of Pennsylvania Press: 488–499. JSTOR 20088183.
- Littlefield, George Emery (1907). The Early Massachusetts Press, 1638-1711. Vol. I. The Club of Odd Volumes.
- —— (1907). The Early Massachusetts Press, 1638–1711. Vol. II. The Club of Odd Volumes.
- Maier, Pauline (1982). The old revolutionaries : political lives in the age of Samuel Adams. New York : Vintage Books. ISBN 978-0-3947-50736.
- —— (1991). From Resistance to Revolution. New York: W.W. Norton. ISBN 978-0-3078-28064.
- —— (2010). Ratification : the people debate the Constitution, 1787-1788. New York: Simon & Schuster. ISBN 978-0-6848-68547.
- —— (April 2012). "Narrative, Interpretation, and the Ratification of the Constitution". The William and Mary Quarterly. 69 (2). Omohundro Institute of Early American History and Culture: 382–390. doi:10.5309/willmaryquar.69.2.0382. hdl:1721.1/72071. JSTOR 10.5309/willmaryquar.69.2.0382.
- Malone, Dumas (1962). Jefferson and his time: Jefferson and the ordeal of liberty. Vol. 3. Boston: Little, Brown and company.
- Matteson, David M. Matteson (1943). Malone, Dumas (ed.). Dictionary of American biography. Vol. X. New York: Charles Scribner's Sons.
- Maxson, John W. Jr. (April 1968). "Papermaking in America From Art to Industry, 1690 to 1860". The Quarterly Journal of the Library of Congress. 25 (2). Library of Congress: 116–129. JSTOR 29781303.
- McCullough, David G. (2001). John Adams. New York: Simon & Schuster. ISBN 978-0-7432-32296.
- Miller, John C. (1959). Origins of the American Revolution. Stanford Calif. : Stanford University Press; London : Oxford University Press.
- Miller, C. William (December 15, 1955). "Franklin's Type: Its Study past and Present". Proceedings of the American Philosophical Society. 99 (6). American Philosophical Society: 418–432. JSTOR 3143924.
- —— (1961). "Franklin's "Poor Richard Almanacs": Their Printing and Publication". Studies in Bibliography. 14. Bibliographical Society of the University of Virginia: 97–115. JSTOR 40371300.
- Miner, Ward L. (1962). William Goddard: Newspaperman. Duke University Press.
- Moran, James (1973). Printing presses: history and development from the fifteenth century to modern times. London, Faber. ISBN 9780520029040.
- Morgan, Edmund Sears (1953). The Stamp act crisis; prologue to revolution. University of North Carolina Press.
- Mulford, Carla (December 2008). "Benjamin Franklin's Savage Eloquence: Hoaxes from the Press at Passy, 1782". Proceedings of the American Philosophical Society. 152 (4). American Philosophical Society: 490–530. JSTOR 40541605.
- Needham, Paul (2009). "Prints in the Early Printing Shops: The Woodcut in Fifteenth-Century Europe". Studies in the History of Art. 75. National Gallery of Art: 38–91. JSTOR 42622514.
- Nelson, Harold L. (April 1959). "Seditious Libel in Colonial America". The American Journal of Legal History. 3 (2). Oxford University Press: 160–172. doi:10.2307/844283. JSTOR 844283.
- Newgass, Edgar (1958). An outline of Anglo-American Bible history. London : B.T. Batsford.
- Oxford University Press (1922). Some account of the Oxford University Press, 1468-1921. Oxford: Clarendon Press. ISBN 978-0-19-955731-8.
- Parker, Peter J. (Spring 1966). "The Philadelphia Printer: A Study of an Eighteenth-Century Businessman". The Business History Review. 40 (1). The President and Fellows of Harvard College: 24–46. doi:10.2307/3112300. JSTOR 3112300. S2CID 156852880.
- Powell, Daniel (1967). United States history; ideas in conflict. Glenview, Ill.: Scott, Foresman.
- Ramsay, David (1789). The history of the American Revolution. Vol. II. Philadelphia: R. Aitken & son.
- Roden, Robert F. (1905). The Cambridge Press, 1638–1692; a history of the first printing press established in English America. New York: Dodd, Mead and Company.
- Rollins, Carl Purington (January 1937). "John Baskerville". The Yale University Library Gazette. 11 (3). Yale University, acting through the Yale University Library: 53–61. JSTOR 40856963.
- Schlesinger, Arthur Meier (1918). The colonial merchants and the American revolution, 1763-1776. New York: Columbia University.
- —— (March 1935). "The Colonial Newspapers and the Stamp Act". The New England Quarterly. 8 (1). The New England Quarterly, Inc.: 63–83. doi:10.2307/359430. JSTOR 359430.
- —— (October 1936). "Politics, Propaganda and the Philadelphia Press". The Pennsylvania Magazine of History and Biography. 60 (4). University of Pennsylvania Press: 309–322. JSTOR 20087003.
- —— (1958). Prelude To Independence The Newspaper War On Britain 1764 1776. Alfred A.Knopf.
- Scott, Kenneth (1958). "James Franklin on counterfeiting". Museum Notes (American Numismatic Society). VIII. American Numismatic Society: 217–220. JSTOR 43573829.
- Sharp, Gene (2015). Before Lexington Resistance, Politics, And The American Struggle For Independence. The Albert Einstein Institution. ISBN 978-1-8808-13249.
- Shaw, Steven J. (Autumn 1959). "Colonial Newspaper Advertising: A Step toward Freedom of the Press". The Business History Review. 33 (3). The President and Fellows of Harvard College: 409–420. doi:10.2307/3111955. JSTOR 3111955.
- Slack, Charles (2015). Liberty's first crisis : Adams, Jefferson, and the misfits who saved free speech. New York, NY: Atlantic Monthly Press. ISBN 9780802123428.
- Smith, William (January 1916). "The Colonial Post-Office". The American Historical Review. 21 (2). Oxford University Press on behalf of the American Historical Association: 258–275. doi:10.2307/1835049. JSTOR 1835049.
- Streeter, Gilbert Lewis (1856). An Account of the Newspapers and Other Periodicals Published in Salem from 1768 to 1856. W. Ives and G.W. Pease, printers.
- Thomas, Isaiah (1874). The history of printing in America, with a biography of printers. Vol. I. New York: B. Franklin.
- —— (1874). The history of printing in America, with a biography of printers. Vol. II. New York: B. Franklin.
- Tyler, Lyon Gardiner (1907). Williamsburg, the old colonial capital. Richmond, Va.: Whittet & Shepperson.
- Updike, Daniel Berkeley (1922). Printing types, their history, forms, and use; a study in survivals. Vol. II. Cambridge: Harvard University Press.
- Watkins, William J. Jr. (2008). Reclaiming the American Revolution. Palgrave Macmillan. ISBN 978-1-4039-63031.
- Weeks, Lyman Horace (1916). A history of paper-manufacturing in the United States, 1690-1916. New York, The Lockwood trade journal company.
- Weeks, Stephen Beauregard (1891). The press of North Carolina in the eighteenth century. Brooklyn, Historical printing club.
- Wendorf, Richard (September 2014). "Declaring, Drafting, and Composing American Independence". The Papers of the Bibliographical Society of America. 108 (3). The University of Chicago Press on behalf of the Bibliographical Society of America: 307–324. doi:10.1086/680864. JSTOR 10.1086/680864. S2CID 174945651.
- Wilson, James Grant; Fiske, John, eds. (1887). Appleton's Cyclopædia of American Biography. Vol. III. New York: D. Appleton and Company.
- Winship, George Parker (1945). The Cambridge Press 1638 1692. Philadelphia : University of Pennsylvania Press. Alternative printing
- Wroth, Lawrence C. (1922). A History of Printing in Colonial Maryland, 1686–1776. Baltimore: Typothetae of Baltimore.
- Wroth, Lawrence C. (1938). The Colonial Printer. Portland, Me., The Southworth-Anthoensen press.
- Yodelis, Mary Ann (1975). Who Paid the Piper?Publishing Economics in Boston, 1763–1775 (PDF). Association for Education in Journalism.
- Yost, Edna (1961). Famous American pioneering women. New York: Dodd, Mead.
- Zimmerman, John L. (October 1954). "Benjamin Franklin and the Pennsylvania Chronicle". The Pennsylvania Magazine of History and Biography. 81 (4). University of Pennsylvania Press: 351–364. JSTOR 20089013.
- "Williamsburg had its own freedom of press battle". Daily Press. Newport News, Virginia. February 27, 1983. p. 27 – via Newspapers.com.
- Encyclopædia Britannica. Vol. XXVII. New York University Press. 1911.

Primary sources

- Dickinson, John (1768). Letters from a farmer in Pennsylvania, to the inhabitants of the British colonies. Philadelphia : Printed by David Hall, and William Sellers.
- Franklin, Benjamin (1895). The autobiography of Benjamin Franklin. Philadelphia: Henry Altemus. "Note: Franklin's autobiography has been printed over the years by numerous publishers."
- Galloway, Joseph (1780). Historical and political reflections on the rise and progress of the American rebellion. London: Printed for G. Wilkie.
- Jefferson, Thomas (1774). Dunlap, John (ed.). A summary view of the rights of British America. Set forth in some resolutions intended for the inspection of the present delegates of the people of Virginia, now in convention.
- Jefferson, Thomas (1787). "From Thomas Jefferson to Edward Carrington, Paris, January 16, 1787". National Archives, Founders Online.
- Jefferson, Thomas (1779). "A Bill for establishing Religious Freedom, printed for the consideration of the People". University of Virginia.
- Jefferson, Thomas. "A Bill for Establishing Religious Freedom, 18 June 1779". National Archive: The National Historical Publications and Records Commission.
- Goddard, William (1770). The partnership: or, The history of the rise and progress of the Pennsylvania Chronicle. Philadelphia: Printed by William Goddard.
- —— (1870). Goddard, William G. (ed.). The political and miscellaneous writings of William G. Goddard, Volume 1. Sidney S. Rider and Brothers, Providence, RI. p. 568.
- Prince, Thomas (1823) [1744]. An Account of the Revival of Religion in Boston in the Years 1740-1-2-3. Boston: Samuel T. Armstrong.
- Wigglesworth, Michael (1867) [1715]. The day of doom, or, A poetical description of the great and last judgement. New York: American News Co.
- Great Britain (1895) [1765]. Hart, Albert Bushnell; Channing, Edward (eds.). The Stamp Act, 1765. New York, A. Lovell & company.
- Colonists Respond to the Townshend Acts (PDF). National Humanities Center. 2013.
- Fifth U.S. Congress (1798). "Alien and Sedition Acts (1798)". National Archives.

Online sources

- "American Newspapers during Ratification, 1787–1788". University of Wisconsin: Center for the Study of the American Constitution, Department of History. 2021.
- "The News Media and the Making of America, 1730–1865". The Antiquarian Society.
- "The U.S. Post Office, 1775–1974". American Heritage Magazine. Archived from the original on March 7, 2011.
- "William Goddard, Behind the Badge: The U.S. Postal Inspection Service". Smithsonian National Postal Museum.
- Bellis, Mary (2016). "History of the United States Postal Service".
- Parkinson, Robert G. (2021). "Print, the Press, and the American Revolution". Oxford Research Encyclopedia of American History. Oxford University Press. doi:10.1093/acrefore/9780199329175.013.9. ISBN 978-0-19-932917-5.
- Reese, William S. (1990). "The First Hundred Years of Printing in British North America: Printers and Collectors". American Antiquarian Society.
- "First Newspaper Printing of the Declaration". Museum of the American Revolution.
