= Josiah Franklin =

English businessman and father of Benjamin Franklin (1657-1745)

- Born: 23 December 1657; Ecton, Northamptonshire, England
- Died: 16 January 1745 (aged 87); Boston, Province of Massachusetts Bay, British America
- Resting place: Granary Burying Ground, Boston
- Occupations: Businessman; tallow chandler; soap boiler
- Known for: Father of Benjamin Franklin
- Spouse(s): Anne Child (1677–1689); Abiah Folger (1689–1745)
- Children: 17, including James, Benjamin, and Jane

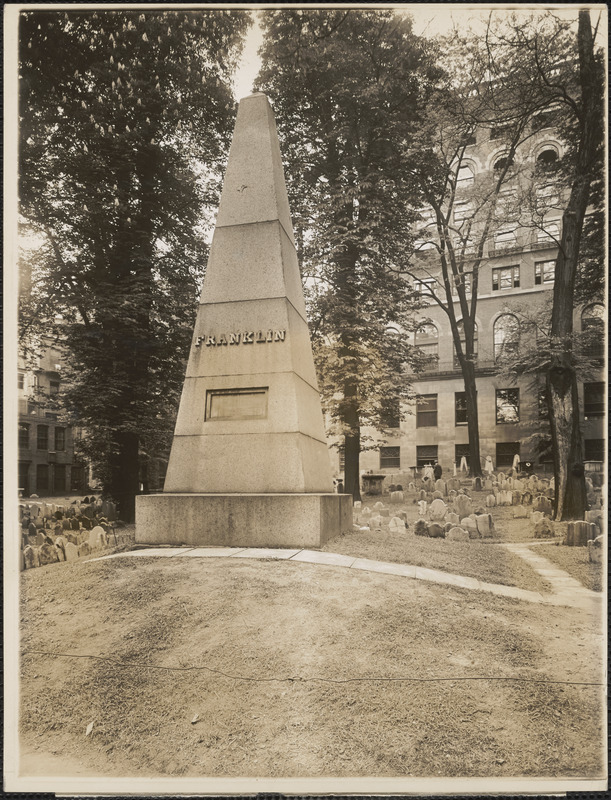
Franklin's gravesite

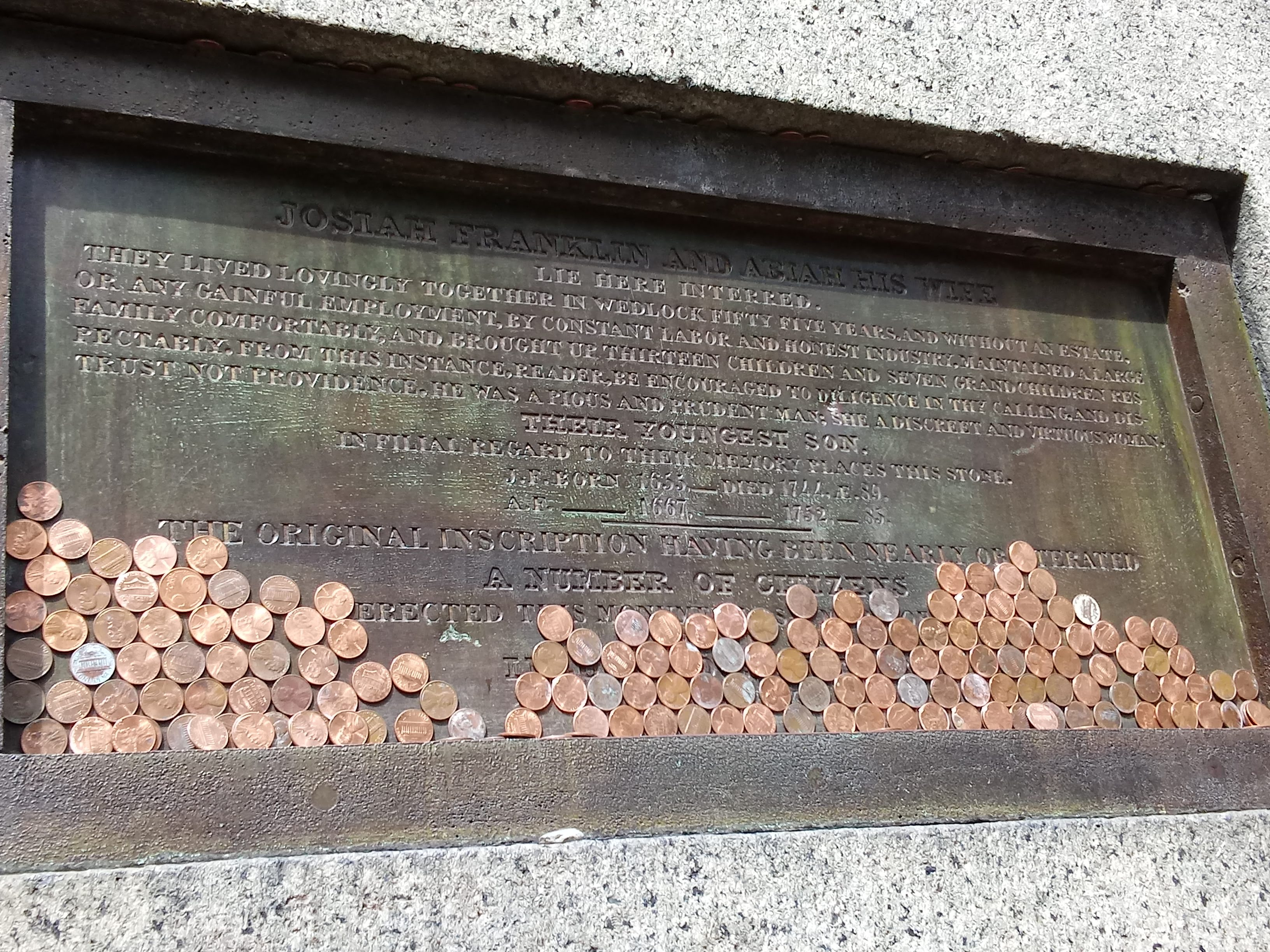
Monument designating the grave of the parents of Benjamin Franklin, adorned with coins from visitors.

Josiah Franklin Sr. (23 December 1657 – 16 January 1745) was an English-born American businessman and the father of Benjamin Franklin. Born in the village of Ecton in Northamptonshire, England, he emigrated to Massachusetts Bay in British America. He was the ninth child of blacksmith Thomas Franklin and his first wife, Jane White.

Josiah Franklin worked as a fabric dyer in Ecton. Franklin immigrated to the American colonies in 1682. He married twice and had 17 children: ten boys and seven girls. In Boston, he was a member of the Congregational Old South Church where he served as a tithingman.

== Marriage to Anne Child ==
Josiah Franklin married his first wife, Anne Child, in 1677. They had seven children. Anne died from complications giving birth in 1689. Upon moving to Boston, Josiah took up the trade of tallow chandler and soap boiler because the trade he was born to was not in demand in New England.

== Marriage to Abiah Folger ==
In November 1689, Josiah Franklin married his second wife, Abiah Folger, in the Old South Church. Abiah of Nantucket, Massachusetts, was the daughter of Peter and Mary Morrill Foulger.

With Josiah, Abiah had 10 children: John (1690–1756), Peter (1692–1766), Mary (1694–1730), James (1697–1735), Sarah (1699–1731), Ebenezer (1701–1702), Thomas (1703–1706), Benjamin (1706–1790), Lydia (1708–1758), and Jane (1712–1794).

== Benjamin Franklin ==
Josiah insisted that each of his sons must learn a trade. He had great dreams of Benjamin becoming a minister, but Josiah could only afford to send his son to school for two years. As his young Benjamin loved to read, Josiah apprenticed him to his brother James, who was a printer. Later, Benjamin Franklin borrowed books from his friends and taught himself arithmetic, grammar, and philosophy. Benjamin had a very strong relationship with his father, who had a great influence on Benjamin.
