= The New-England Courant =

Early American newspaper

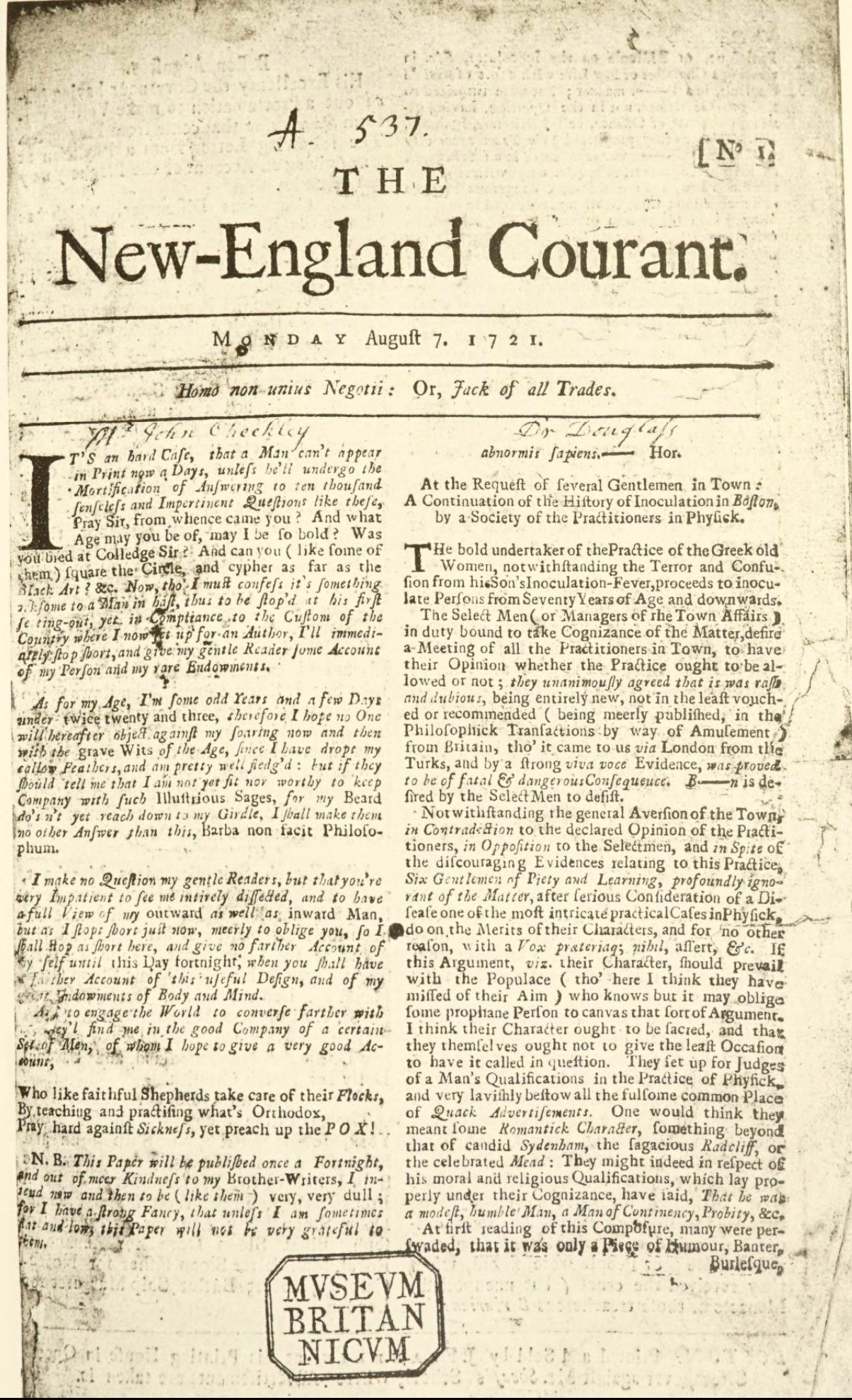
- August 7, 1721, first issue
- Type: Weekly newspaper
- Format: Broadsheet
- Publisher: James Franklin
- Founded: August 7, 1721
- Ceased publication: June 25, 1726

The New-England Courant (also spelled New England Courant), one of the first American newspapers, was founded in Boston in 1721, by James Franklin. It was a weekly newspaper and the third to appear in Boston. Unlike other newspapers, it offered a more critical view of the Massachusetts colonial government. The newspaper published critical commentary about smallpox inoculation which fueled the controversy during the smallpox epidemic in Boston. Ultimately it was suppressed in 1726 by the colonial government for printing what they considered seditious articles.

Franklin took on his brother, Benjamin Franklin, as an apprentice and at one point was compelled to sign over publication of the Courant to him to avert further prosecution. Benjamin submitted anonymous editorials to the Courant, which resulted in James' imprisonment after he began publishing them. This sort of governmental censorship of early colonial newspapers is what largely fostered the American ideal of freedom of speech in the press. The New England Courant is widely noted among historians as being the first newspaper to publish Benjamin's writings.

== History ==
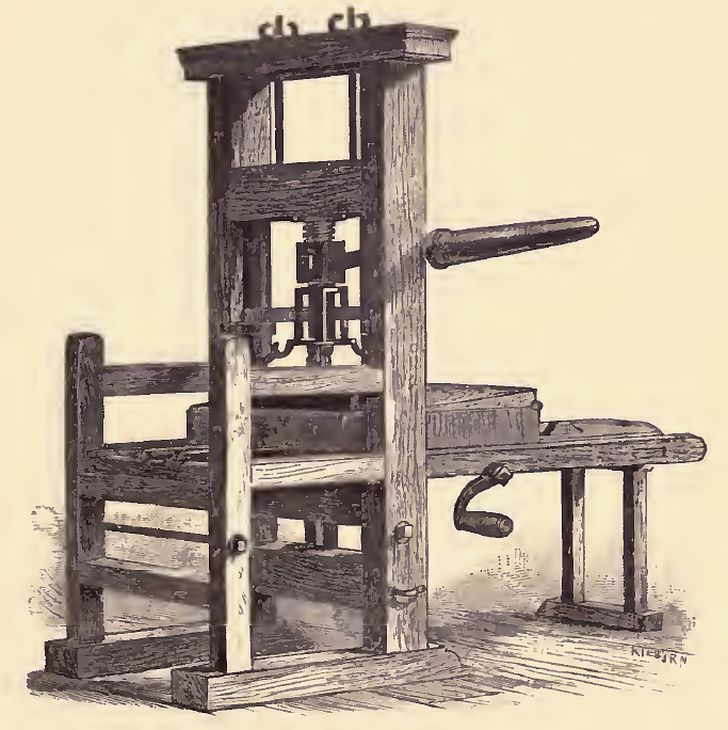
The Ramage printing press, made in London, used by James Franklin

The New-England Courant made its first appearance on Monday, August 7, 1721, printed and published by James Franklin and was the third newspaper established in Boston. James was the elder brother of the renowned Benjamin Franklin, and began his printing career in Boston in March 1716 at the age of twenty-five. He owned his own printing press and type brought over from London where he had served as an apprentice. He printed pamphlets for various booksellers, and was the first printer for The Boston Gazette. When Samuel Kneeland and his partner took over publication of the Gazette James was replaced as its printer. Offended by the loss of that position, and encouraged by a number of respectable friends who wanted to see a newspaper that presented a more critical and candid view than other newspapers, he established and began to print The New-England Courant, and without official review and approval, at his own risk.

Operating without a printing license from provincial government, (Note: Before the American Revolution printers and newspaper publishers were required to obtain an official license, with their publications subject to review and possible censorship.) The New-England Courant became the first truly independent American newspaper to use literary content, critical and often humorous essays. (Note: B. Franklin recalls its literary style: "The earlier numbers of the New England Courant were principally filled with original articles, in the form of essays, letters, and short paragraphs, written with considerable ability and wit, and touching with great freedom the vices and follies of the time. The weapon of satire was used with an unsparing hand.") It debuted at a time when there was much political and social controversy over the cause of poverty in Boston, which was compounded by the smallpox epidemic, its controversy over the proposed inoculation, and the severe censorship on the part of the provincial government and clergy towards individual opinions and conduct.

James announced the birth of the Courant with a scathing attack on Cotton Mather, a major supporter of inoculation, and in its outspoken and candid capacity his newspaper gave the signal for rebellion against such established authority. Not satisfied with voicing simple protest, it assailed the most honored names and the most deeply cherished opinions without reservation. In a public address James criticized The Boston News-Letter for being overly modest and compliant with governmental authority, referring to it as "a dull vehicle of intelligence".

At 4 pence a copy, the New-England Courant was the most expensive newspaper of its time. It consisted of one single sheet printed on both sides, focusing mostly on shipping reports, snippets of information from neighboring towns, and letters from Europe. From the start, Franklin's New England Courant, was more enthusiastic and outspoken in its treatment of Boston's public affairs than the existing newspapers. Its real substance was in letters to the editor from Boston's intellectuals who were highly critical of the Massachusetts colonial government. As such it often found itself in the middle of political or social controversy. The New England Courant, however, proved a success, and rescued James's struggling printing business.

=== Smallpox controversy ===
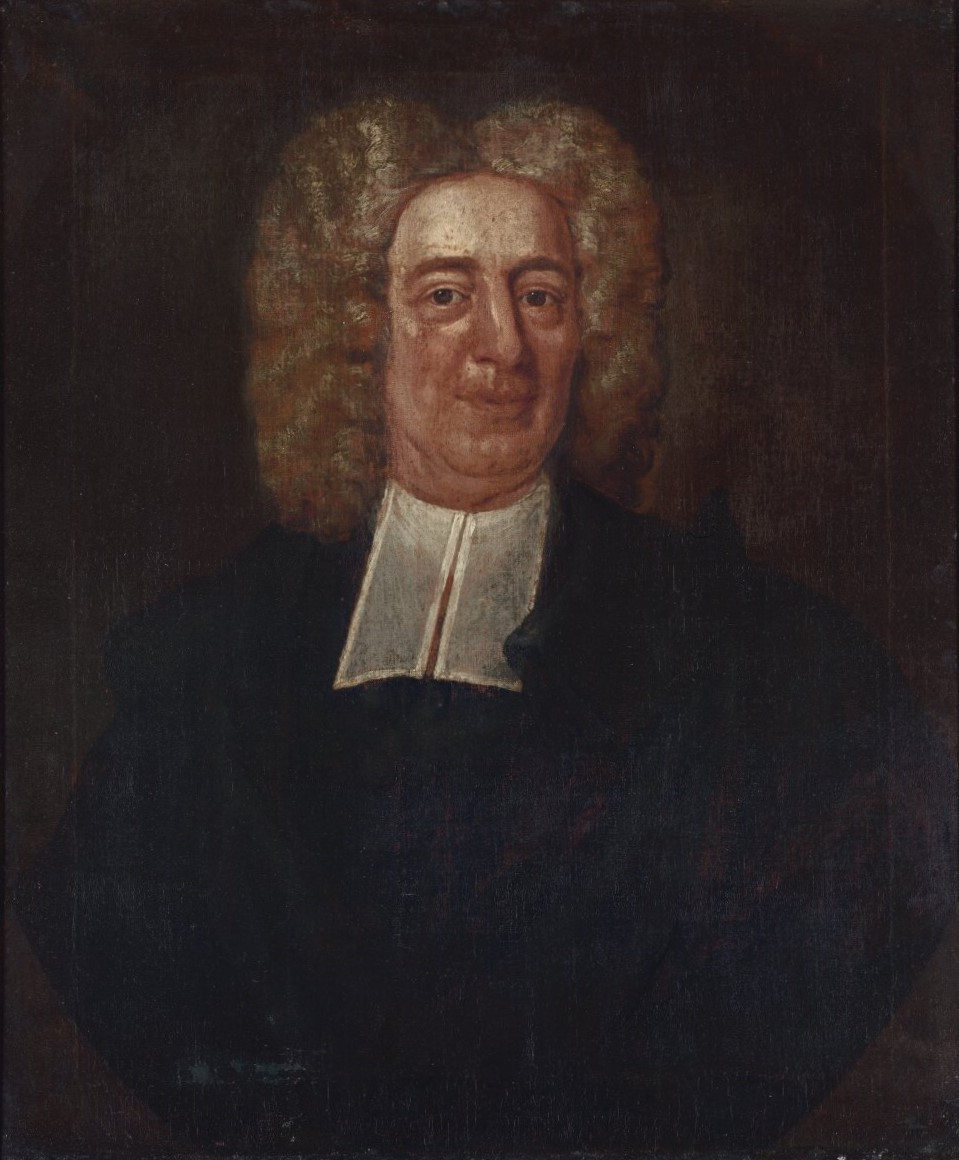
Cotton Mather, who supported the smallpox inoculation and was derided in the New-England Courant for doing so.

In 1721, just before The New-England Courant made its first appearance, HMS Seahorse arrived at Boston harbor from the West Indies carrying many passengers infected with smallpox. The highly contagious disease quickly spread and within months approximately nine hundred of Boston's ten thousand residents had died. The smallpox epidemic naturally was a cause for great alarm, while the city's publishing and other intellectual pursuits had declined considerably. A highly questionable method of inoculation was being proposed, but the greater Boston populace feared that this would only serve to accelerate the spread of the disease. Strong differences in opinion over the ethics of inoculation sparked a bitter newspaper and pamphlet war, of which the Courant was playing a major role, beginning with its first issue of August 7.

Reverend Cotton Mather, a prominent and respected Puritan who trained as a physician before becoming a preacher, sent out letters to various doctors in Boston, urging their support for inoculation, but nearly all of them were highly skeptical of the practice. Franklin was bitterly opposed to the prospect and through the New-England Courant he rushed into the fray on the anti-inoculation side. In the Courant he characterized Mather as the "arch-hypocrite of New-England" who had abandoned his religious principles by his support for the smallpox inoculation. At this time the editors of The Boston News-Letter and the Boston Gazette had refused to print any accounts opposing inoculation. Subsequently, one of the reasons Franklin started the Courant was to give Doctor William Douglass (Note: Douglas was the only physician in Boston who had an actual medical degree. At first he opposed the inoculation of smallpox, but by 1730 he had changed his views and had become an advocate of the prospect, and eventually administered the inoculations himself, although he and Mather never reconciled their differences.) and others who opposed inoculation a voice to make their opposition public. Although no actual names were used it was very apparent that the Courant was attacking the Reverend Mather by mocking and mimicking his sermons.

On January 14 a committee of the House ordered James Franklin from further publication of the New-England Courant as they felt that it was being used to mock religion and held the holy scriptures in contempt, while the "faithful Ministers of the Gospel" were being routinely slandered. In response to Franklin's derogatory statements Mather declared that The New-England Courant was "carried on by a Hell-Fire Club, (Note: The Hell-Fire Club consisted of about forty people, including fifteen ladies of considerable respectability. They "blasphemously assumed to themselves" the tremendous names of God, saints and other biblical figures, and were known to ridicule religious doctrine.) with a Non-Juror at the head of them." Mather openly condemned and denounced the "vile Courant", for "wicked Libel" and for "Wicked Comments" made against him in an address to the general public, which was published in the January 29, 1721 issue of The Boston Gazette. From that point on Franklin and his newspaper were incessantly challenged in this manner for their criticisms about inoculation and the clergy.

=== Legal trouble ===
At various times during his six-year term as printer and publisher of the New-England Courant James Franklin found himself at odds and in the middle of controversy with the Massachusetts provincial government and the Clergy. On June 11, 1722, he printed what appeared to be an innocent enough account about the particular affairs of the Massachusetts government when he published that,

"We are advised from Boston that the government of Massachusetts are fitting out a ship [the Flying Horse], to go after the pirates, to be commanded by Captain Peter Papillon, and ’tis thought he will sail some time this month, wind and weather permitting.”

The magisterial Council for their own reasons took this to be an insult, and perhaps a breach of security, resulting in James' incarceration for a couple of weeks. Meanwhile, Benjamin took over operations of the Courant. However, upon the publication January issue 1723, James got into serious trouble when he published an account, which Benjamin later referred to as an "Essay against Hypocrites”. Against the advice of his father and various friends Franklin, regardless, published the paper's first issue.

In 1718 Franklin's younger brother, Benjamin Franklin, was pressed into service as his apprentice at the age of twelve, while he was printer for The Boston Gazette - three years before he established the Courant. The apprenticeship included a variety of odd jobs, including typesetting issuing pamphlets, linens and silks. Beginning at age sixteen, Benjamin would later write some fifteen controversial editorials under the pen name of Silence Dogood, disguising his hand-writing, and submitted them to the Courant by slipping them under the door of the printing shop. His brother had no knowledge about who had actually written them. Impressed with the writing, James shared the Dogood letters with his newspaper colleagues who regarded them with equal approval. (Note: In his Autobiography Franklin recalls this event in detail, as he was present when Franklin's colleagues shared their approbations over his writings.) After his editorials began appearing in the Courant Benjamin was thrilled that his writing was being published for the public to read. When he finally informed his brother that he was the author James became angry. One of the letters was about the virtues of freedom of speech, and contained the following passage: "WITHOUT Freedom of Thought, there can be no such Thing as Wisdom; and no such thing as public Liberty, without Freedom of Speech; which is the right of every man, as far as by it, he does not hurt or control the Right of another." One such article led to James Franklin's imprisonment from June 12 until July 7, 1722, after he declined to reveal the identity of its author. Benjamin Franklin continued to publish the Courant while James was serving his term in prison. Upon his release Franklin was ordered by the Massachusetts provincial government to cease publishing The New-England Courant, without first submitting its contents for review by the secretary of the Massachusetts province. (Note: The actual order read: "James Franklin should no longer print or publish the newspaper called The New England Courant, or any Pamphlet or paper of the like Nature, Except it be first Supervised, by the Secretary of this Province") However, Franklin, regardless, continued publishing the Courant, which went unpunished, and which marked the beginning of the end of restrictive censorship by the government.

=== Aftermath ===
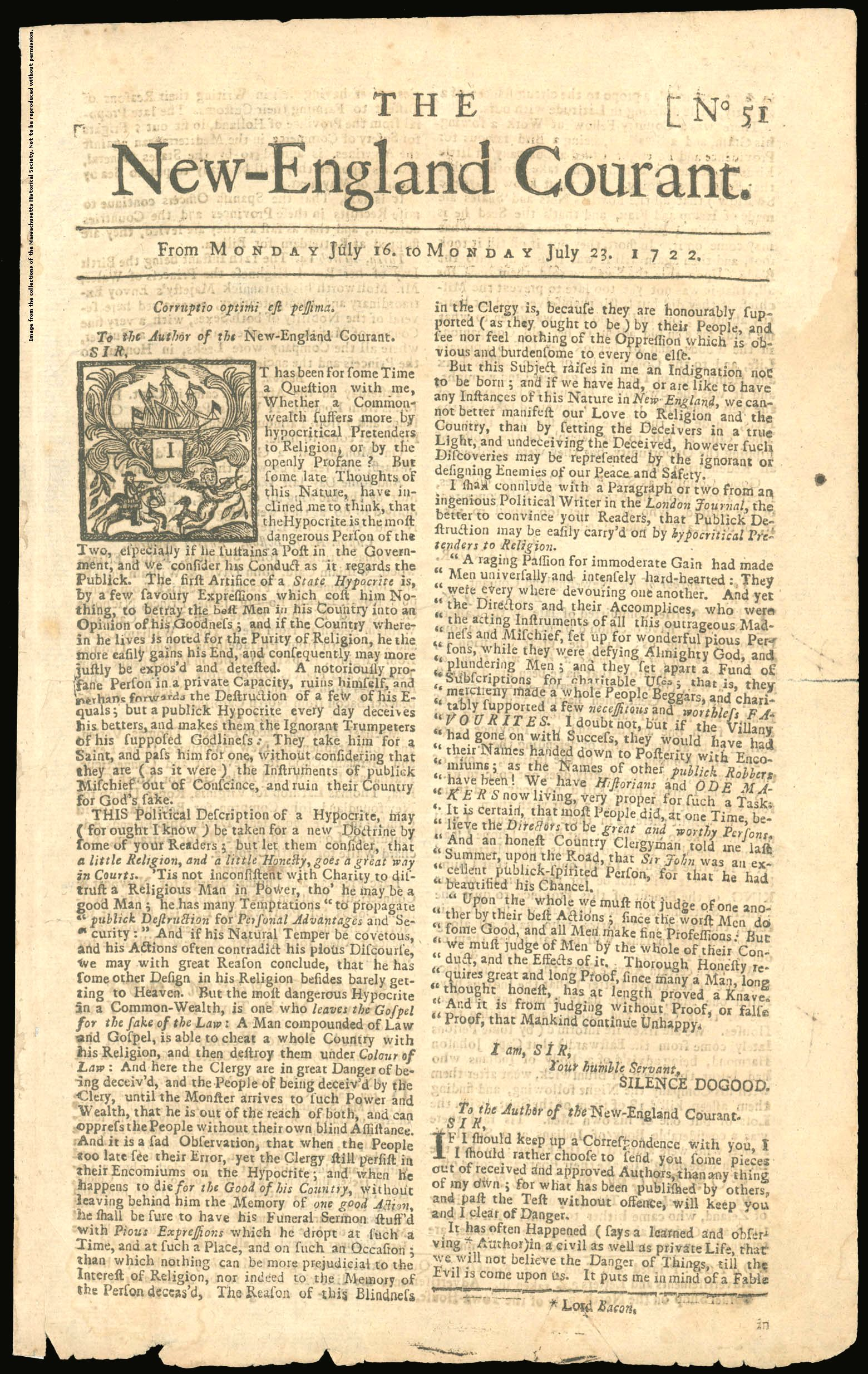
The New-England Courant July 16–23, 1722, featuring Silence Dogood editorial #9

Deeply galled over the cause of his brother's imprisonment, Benjamin "unleashed a piercing attack" at colonial authorities after James' release from jail, through another Silence Dogood editorial (essay 9), which was carried by the July 16–23, 1722 issue of Courant, considered the "most biting of his entire career". In the opening passage of the editorial the question was put forward:

"Whether a commonwealth suffers more by hypocritical pretenders to religion or by the openly profane. But some late thoughts of this nature have inclined me to think that the hypocrite is the most dangerous person of the two, especially if he sustains a post in the government."

Not long after his release from prison, in January 1723, James subsequently held a secret meeting with his brother, now seventeen years old, in his shop. There they decided that the best way to get around the government's prohibitive order was to publish the Courant without James as the official publisher. Beginning on Monday, February 11, 1723, the inscription, "Printed and sold by Benjamin Franklin" appeared in the heading of the Courant. Benjamin conducted its publication more cautiously than did his brother. His first issue contained an editorial which denounced publishing anything " hateful" and "malicious". It declared that from now on the Courant would be "designed purely for the diversion and merriment of the reader" and also to "entertain the town with the most comical and diverting incidents of human life." The editorial also stated that the master of The New-England Courant would be the Roman god Janus, who could look in opposite directions at the same time.

Subsequent issues, however, did not live up to declaration put forward in Benjamin's editorial. Most of the articles consisted of dated dispatches rehashing foreign news and old speeches. Only one of these essays was clearly written by Benjamin which were an essay about the folly of titles of nobility, which was consistent with his lifelong aversion to titles based on heredity and aristocracy. A few weeks passed and James, considered a man of jealous and tyrannical disposition, returned to the Courant and resumed treating Benjamin as an apprentice, and subjected his teenage brother to beatings, rather than as a fellow writer and brother. Eventually the relationship between James and Benjamin Franklin suffered as the New-England Courant reached the peak of its fame. Benjamin would later recall that this "demanded too much of me", and was now anxious to move out on his own and in 1723, he left for Philadelphia. Benjamin assumed correctly that his brother would not seek legal recourse for breaking his apprenticeship with James, (Note: Apprentices were legally bound to serve out the full term of their apprenticeship:Benjamin's term was for nine years.) as it would reveal that James had signed over the New-England Courant in his name, undermining the arrangement James had with Benjamin. (Note: In order to prevent the court from acting against Ben as James's apprentice, James relinquished Benjamin's term of apprenticeship and signed the back of the original agreement which released his brother from all legal obligations.) The New-England Courant continued to be published under Benjamin's name until the final release of its 255th issue, dated June 25, 1726. The Courant thereafter slowly failed in the face of the constant conflicts with Mathers and Puritanical Boston and wore James down, where he subsequently folded the paper and removed to Rhode Island where he eventually died in 1735.

== Legacy ==
Benjamin Franklin biographer, Walter Isaacson, maintains that the New-England Courant is remembered in history chiefly because it contained the first words of Benjamin to be published for the general public, which launched Benjamin's printing career. James Franklin came to be known as the strict and jealous master which Benjamin described in his famous autobiography. Isaacson further states that The New-England Courant was America's first independent newspaper that proved to be a bold-anti-establishment journal, the "first open effort to defy the norm", and the first newspaper that promoted the ideal of Freedom of Speech.

The only known remaining copies of The New-England Courant are housed in the library of the Massachusetts Historical Society. They are all bound together in one volume, and are far from being in perfect condition. The April 2, 1722 issue (pictured below) is the only surviving issue of The New-England Courant that published Benjamin Franklin's earliest known writing.

== Selected issues ==
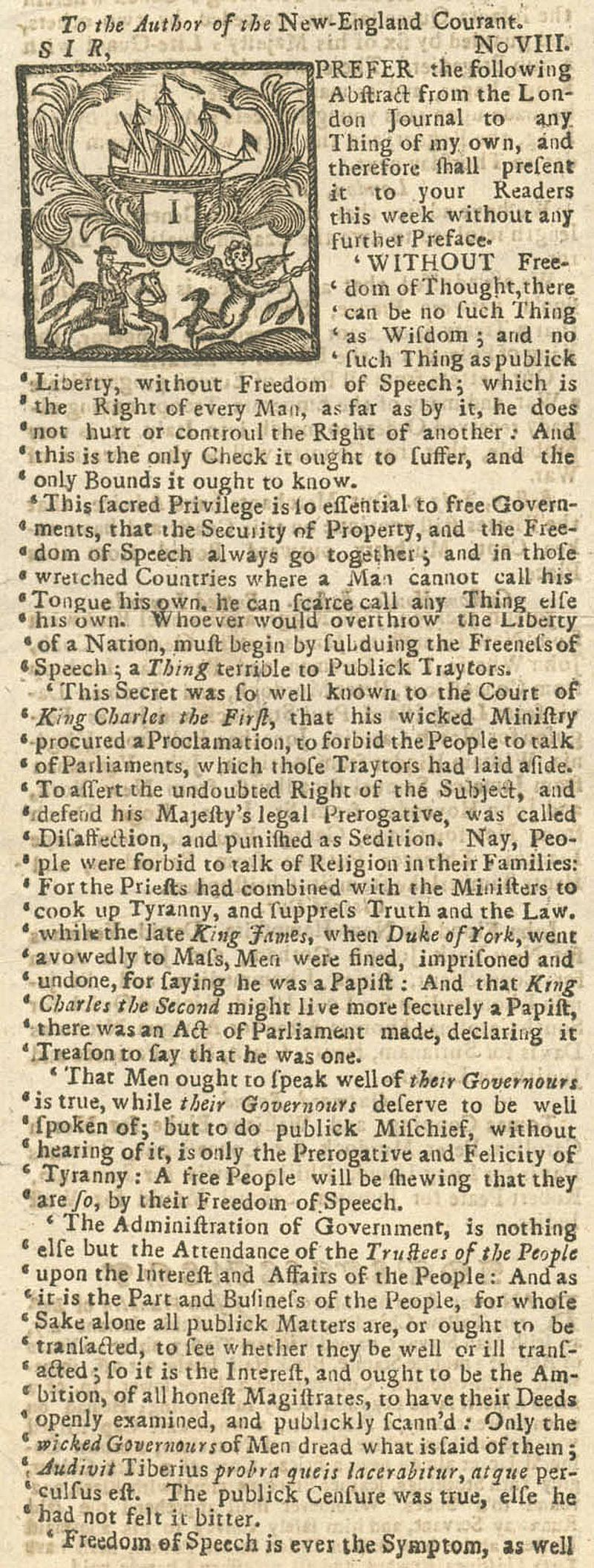
Benjamin Franklin under the assumed name of Silence Dogood, essay about Freedom of Speech submitted to The New-England Courant; Excerpt from July 2–9, 1722 issue

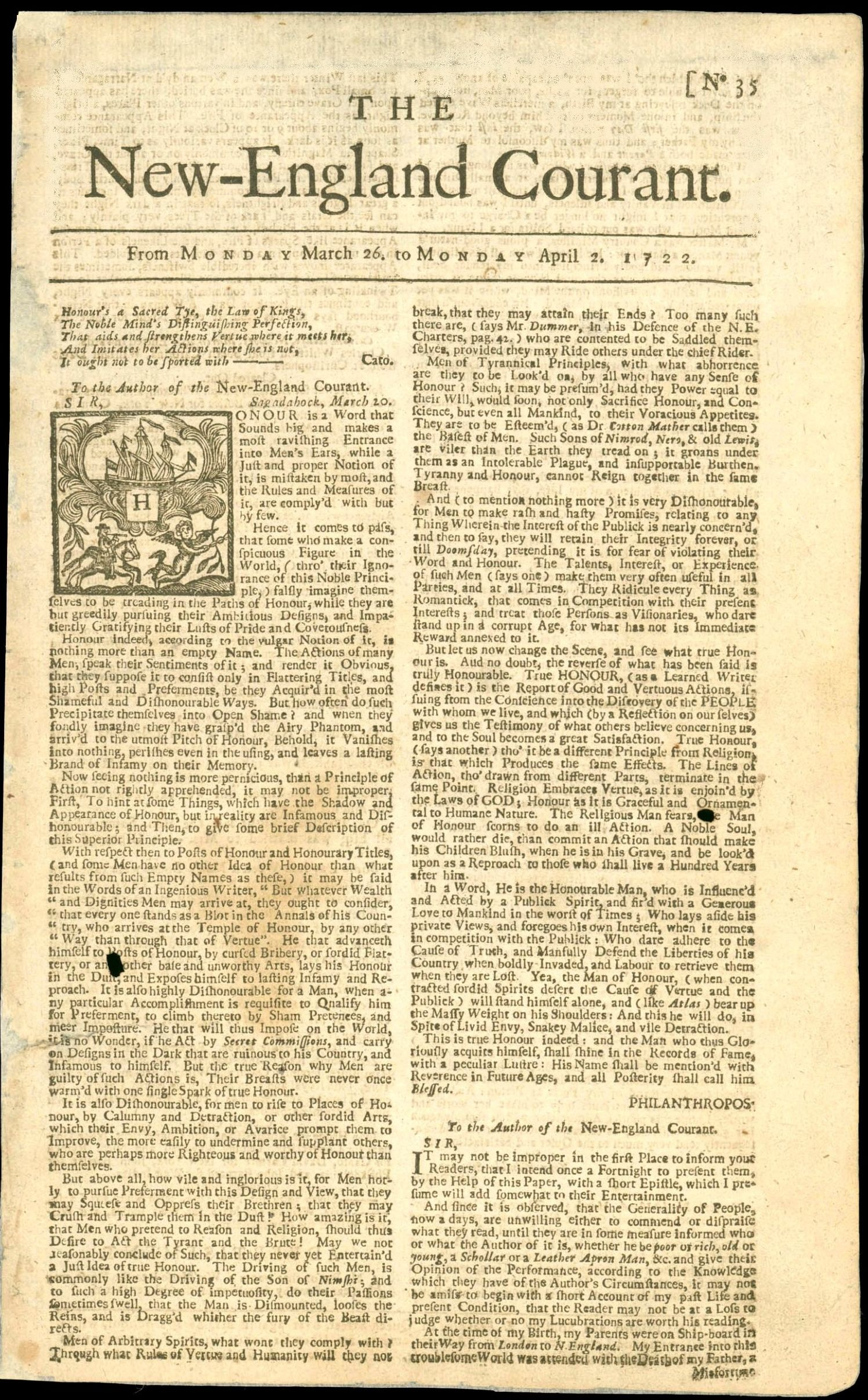
:New England Courant, April 2, 1722

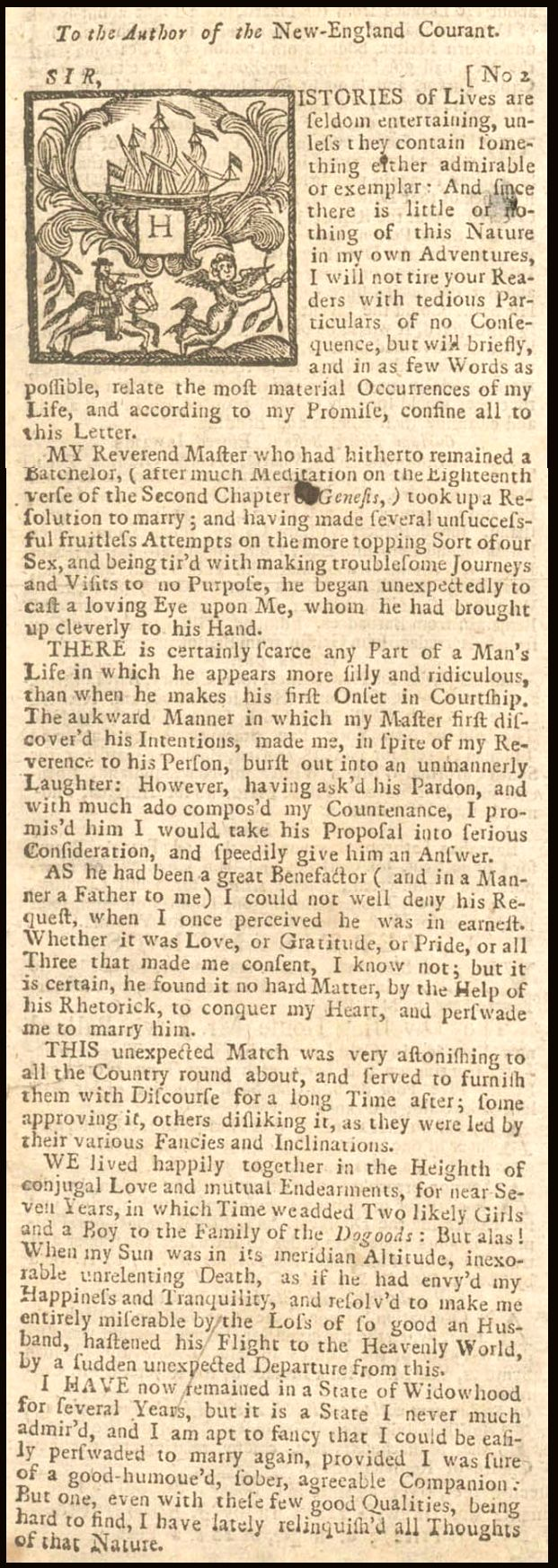
Silence Dogood Essay in New England Courant; Excerpt from April 16, 1722, issue

== See also ==
- Early American publishers and printers
- Newspapers of colonial America

== Bibliography ==
- Ashe, Geoffrey (2000). The hell-fire clubs : a history of anti-morality. Stroud : Sutton. ISBN 978-0-7509-24023.
- Blake, John B. (December 1952). "The Inoculation Controversy in Boston: 1721-1722". The New England Quarterly. 25 (4). The New England Quarterly, Inc.: 489–506. doi:10.2307/362582. JSTOR 362582.
- Brands, H. W. (2000). The first American : the life and times of Benjamin Franklin. New York : Doubleday. ISBN 978-0-3077-54943. Google link
- Buckingham, Joseph Tinker (1850). Specimens of newspaper literature : with personal memoirs, anecdotes, and reminiscences. Vol. I. Boston : Charles C. Little and James Brown.
- Douglass, William (1897). Bullock, Charles J. (ed.). A Discourse Concerning the Currencies of the British Plantations in America, &c. American Economic Association.
- Drake, Samuel Gardner (1856). The history & antiquities of Boston : from its settlement in 1630, to the year 1770. Boston : Luther Stevens.
- Duniway, Clyde Augustus (1906). The development of freedom of the press in Massachusetts. Vol. XII. New York, Longmans.
- Fireoved, Joseph (Winter 1985). "Nathaniel Gardner and the "New-England Courant"". Early American Literature. 20 (3). University of North Carolina Press: 214–235. JSTOR 25055558.
- Franklin, Benjamin (1895) [1757]. The autobiography of Benjamin Franklin. Philadelphia : Henry Altemus. "Note: Franklin's autobiography has been printed over the years by numerous publishers, and page numbers can differ."
- "The New-England Courant". Independence Hall Association.
- Isaacson, Walter (2003). Benjamin Franklin: An American Life. New York: Simon & Schuster. ISBN 9780743258074.
- Lee, James Melvin (1923). History of American journalism. Boston, New York, Houghton Mifflin Company.
- Lemay, J. A. Leo (2006). The life of Benjamin Franklin. University of Pennsylvania Press. ISBN 978-0-8122-38556.
- Miller, Perry (1956). The New-England courant; a selection of certain issues containing writings of Benjamin Franklyn or published by him during his brother's imprisonment. Boston American Academy of Arts and Sciences.
- Thomas, Isaiah (1874). The history of printing in America, with a biography of printers. Vol. I. New York, B. Franklin.
- Thomas, Isaiah (1874). The history of printing in America, with a biography of printers. Vol. II. New York, B. Franklin.
- Winsor, Justin, ed. (1881). The memorial history of Boston : including Suffolk County, Massachusetts. 1630-1880. Vol. II. Boston: James R. Osgood.
- Franklin, Benjamin (1722). "Silence Dogood essay 8". Massachusetts Historical Society.
