= Mary Morrell Folger =

Grandmother of Benjamin Franklin

- Born: Mary Morrell (Morrel/Morrill/Morrills/Morill); Circa 1620; England
- Died: 1704; British America
- Known for: Grandmother of Benjamin Franklin and being noted in Herman Melville's fictional Moby-Dick
- Spouse: Peter Folger
- Children: Nine, including Abiah Folger
- Relatives: Grandson, Founding Father Benjamin Franklin, Great-Grandson, Founder of Cornell University Ezra Cornell

Mary Folger (née Morrell (Morrel/Morrill/Morrills/Morill); c. 1620–1704) was the maternal grandmother of Benjamin Franklin, a Founding Father of the United States. In Herman Melville's 1851 novel Moby-Dick, she was cited as an ancestor of the Folger whalers.

== Personal life ==
Folger immigrated to Massachusetts Bay Colony from Norwich, England in 1635 with Rev. Hugh Peters and his family. She was an indentured servant, working for the family as a maid on the same ship as Peter Folger and his parents. Peter Folger paid Hugh Peters the sum of 20 pounds to pay off Mary's servitude, which he declared was the best appropriation of money he had ever made.

She married Peter Folger in 1644. They lived in Watertown, Massachusetts before moving in 1660 to Martha's Vineyard, where he was acquainted with the Mayhews. He was a strict teacher, surveyor, and translator for the Wampanoag people.

They had nine children, eight of whom were born on Martha's Vineyard. In 1663, they moved to Nantucket, where they were among the few people of European heritage. Their youngest daughter, Abiah (1667–1752) was born there. later marrying Boston candle-maker Josiah Franklin and having a son, Benjamin Franklin.

Her husband died in 1690, and she died in 1704.

== Legacy ==
Folger was referenced in defense of the whaling industry in Herman Melville's fictional Moby-Dick. In it, Melville sets up a series of objections to that industry, one of which is "No good blood in their veins?" The response is:

They have something better than royal blood there. The grandmother of Benjamin Franklin was Mary Morrel; afterwards, by marriage, Mary Folger, one of the old settlers of Nantucket, and the ancestress to a long line of Folgers and harpooneers—all kith and kin to noble Benjamin—this day darting the barbed iron from one side of the world to the other.

— Herman Melville, Moby-Dick
