= Jane Franklin Mecom =

18th-century American and sister of Benjamin Franklin

- Born: March 27, 1712; Boston, Massachusetts Bay, British America
- Died: May 7, 1794 (aged 82); Boston, Massachusetts, U.S.
- Spouse: Edward Mecom (m. 1727; died 1765)
- Children: 12
- Parent(s): Josiah Franklin; Abiah Folger
- Family: Benjamin Franklin (brother); James Franklin (brother)

Jane Franklin Mecom (March 27, 1712 – May 7, 1794) was the youngest sister of Benjamin Franklin and was considered one of his closest confidants. Mecom and Franklin corresponded for sixty-three years, throughout the course of Ben Franklin's life, and some of their letters survive.

== Early life and family ==
Mecom's father had seven children from a previous marriage. Mecom was the youngest of ten children to Josiah Franklin's second wife, Abiah Folger. Jane Franklin was born at Blue Ball house on Union Street in Boston, Massachusetts on March 27, 1712.

Mecom never attended school, as public schools in Boston did not enroll women. Though Mecom never attended school, she learned to read and write under the tutelage of Benjamin Franklin. This education under Benjamin Franklin continued until Mecom was 11 years old. In 1723, Benjamin ran away to become a printer in New York and escape his indenture to his brother, leaving his 11-year-old sister alone. Franklin first wrote a letter to Mecom in 1726, and their correspondence continued until Franklin's death in 1790.

At 15, she was married off, although the legal marrying age in Massachusetts was 16, and her brothers and most of her sisters had married by 24, none of them before 20. She was married to a nearly illiterate 22-year-old saddler, Edward Mecom, a poor Scottish immigrant whose swings of mental instability were inherited by at least two of his sons. Constantly in deep debt, he spent much of his marriage in debtors' prison, leaving his wife to be the family breadwinner. Mecom's historians agree that this likely was not a love match. Mark Van Doren was the first biographer of Jane Franklin and his Jane Mecom: Franklin's Favorite Sister (1950) draws on years of correspondence between Jane and Benjamin Franklin. Jill Lepore theorizes that the young girl could have had an affair and become pregnant out of wedlock from it, and the marriage was an attempt to save the family dignity. If there had been a child she miscarried it; her first son, Josiah Mecom, was born two years later and she named him for her father. He died at age 11 months.

Jane and Edward Mecom had twelve children: Josiah Mecom I, Edward "Neddy" Mecom, Benjamin "Benny" Mecom, Ebenezer Mecom, Sarah "Sally" Mecom, Peter Franklin Mecom, John Mecom, Josiah Mecom, Jane "Jenny" Mecom, James Mecom, Mary "Polly" Mecom, and Abiah Mecom.

One son, Benjamin, disappeared during the Battle of Trenton. Two of her sons struggled with mental illness. Mecom made efforts to keep her children out of debtors' prison, the almshouse, and asylums. Several of them succumbed to an illness now believed to be tuberculosis. Only one of Mecom's children outlived her, her daughter, Jane Collas. Her husband, Edward Mecom died in 1765 after 38 years of marriage, leaving no will, and leaving Mecom in debt.

== Life and work ==
To earn money, Mecom boiled soap and took in boarders. Mecom ran a boarding house for members of the House of Representatives in Boston in the 1750s which was likely where she began hearing about current political issues and forming opinions on them, which she more readily began to share in her correspondence with Benjamin Franklin. In November 1766, she and her daughters Jenny and Polly established a small shop to sell caps and bonnets that they created using materials sent from London by a friend of Benjamin Franklin. Her skills in needlework and her brother's fame kept her products circulating among wealthier people. The shop failed when colonists boycotted imported products due to the Townshend Act, a decision Benjamin Franklin could only encourage. In June 1768, she tried to open her business a second time and failed again.

By August 1768, Benjamin Franklin's political views had grown more radical in support of American politics and nonimportation, while Mecom still detested the aggression of both sides at the time. Although Mecom is not widely believed to have been supportive of the American cause until 1774, evidence from Franklin's replies to Mecom suggest that she was writing in favor of nonimportation and American patriotism by January 1769. In 1769, Mecom moved to Philadelphia and returned to Boston in 1770, missing much of the rioting that took place in the city and the Boston Massacre. When the British invaded Boston in 1775, Mecom fled to Rhode Island to live with Catherine Greene, wife of the governor of Rhode Island. She then moved to Philadelphia to live with Franklin, which marked the first time they had seen each other in 11 years. In 1777, she returned to live with the Greenes or her granddaughter, Jenny Flagg Greene until 1779 when she could safely return to Boston.

It was Mecom's homemade soaps that Franklin used to woo the French, presenting the image of a humbled, "homespun" American.

No letters passed between Franklin and Mecom between 1780 and 1782, but Franklin did secure an annuity for Mecom so that she would not have to worry about money.

== Writing and involvement in politics ==
Although Jane Mecom and Benjamin Franklin corresponded for six decades following his departure from their childhood home, letters written by Mecom before 1758 are lost. Prior to that date, the only record of her writing is a slim book that she made to chronicle her life. Mecom named her chronicle "Book of Ages."

Mecom's letters to Franklin from 1770 to 1774 are lost, but a letter from November 1774 shows Mecom's involvement in both Franklin's career and the political situation in America at the time. Her interests in politics had grown substantially in her later life. Her distaste for Britain grew substantially, as well, so much so that she considered removing the "crown" stamp from her soaps to replace them with the 13 stars. In the postwar period, Mecom's letters show her to have grown in commitment for the American cause.

== Later life ==
When Benjamin Franklin died in 1790 his will stipulated that Mecom should continue to live as she had since 1784, in her Unity Street house, which was owned by Franklin until she died. Franklin's memoirs were released after his death, containing no mention of Mecom. He also arranged for an allowance of 50 pounds to be given to her each year, a sizable sum at the time. Jane died four years later on May 7, 1794, at 83, survived by her only remaining child, Jane Mecom. The house was demolished in 1939 to make room for a memorial to Paul Revere. There is no knowledge of where she is buried.

She gave the majority of her papers to her granddaughter, Jenny Mecom. Jared Sparks collected and published the correspondence between Mecom and Franklin, although he heavily edited Mecom's letters to change her original spellings.

== Sources ==
- Benjamin Franklin and Catherine Ray Greene: Their Correspondence 1755–1790 (Philadelphia: American Philosophical Society, 1949. W. G. Roelker, editor.)
- Jeremy A. Stern, "Jane Franklin Mecom: A Boston Woman in Revolutionary Times," Early American Studies – Vol. 4, Number 1, Spring 2006, pp. 147–191, link to abstract
- Jill Lepore, "The Prodigal Daughter," The New Yorker, July 8, 2013, available online
