= Granary Burying Ground =

Burial site in Boston, Massachusetts

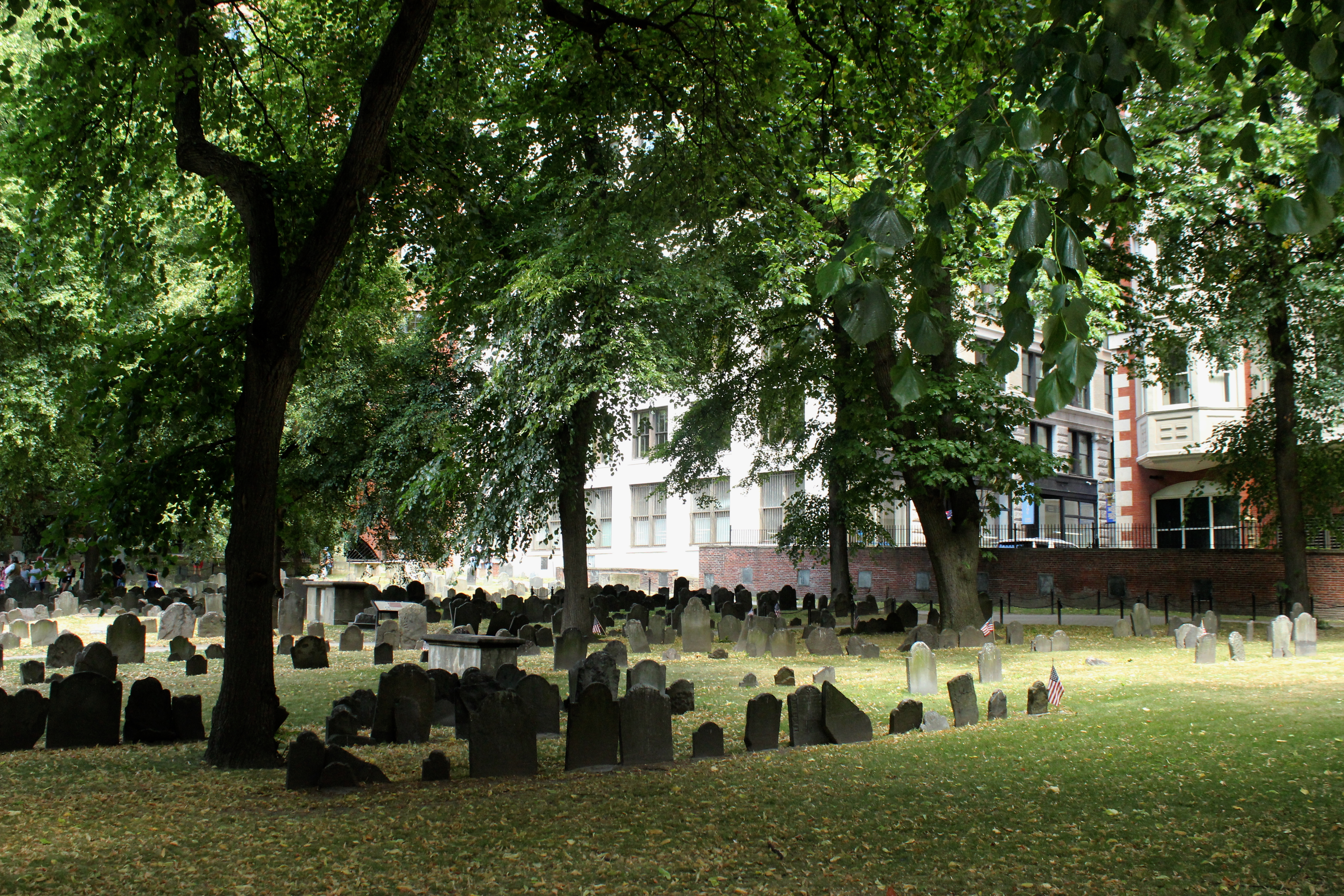
- Granary Burying Ground
- Interactive map of Granary Burying Ground

Details
- Established: 1660 (366 years ago)
- Location: Tremont Street and Bromfield Street, Boston, Massachusetts
- Country: United States
- Coordinates: 42°21′27″N 71°03′42″W
- Type: Historical
- Owned by: City of Boston
- No. of graves: 6,000+
- Website: Granary Burying Ground

The Granary Burying Ground in Massachusetts is the city of Boston's third-oldest cemetery, founded in 1660 and located on Tremont Street. It is the burial location of Revolutionary War-era patriots, including Paul Revere; Christopher Seider, who was the first American casualty of the American Revolution; the five victims of the Boston Massacre; and three signers of the Declaration of Independence: Samuel Adams, John Hancock, and Robert Treat Paine. The cemetery has 2,345 grave-markers, while historians estimate that as many as 5,000 people are buried there.

The cemetery is adjacent to Park Street Church, behind the Boston Athenæum and immediately across from Suffolk University Law School. It is a site on Boston's Freedom Trail. The cemetery's Egyptian revival gate and fence were designed by architect Isaiah Rogers (1800–1869), who designed an identical gate for Newport's Touro Cemetery.

== History ==
The Burying Ground was the third cemetery established in Boston and dates to 1660. The need for the site arose because the land set aside for Boston's first cemetery—King's Chapel Burying Ground, located a block east—was insufficient to meet Boston's growing population. The area was known as the South Burying Ground until 1737, at which point it took on the name of the granary building which stood on the site of the present-day Park Street Church. In May 1830, trees were planted in the area and an attempt was made to change the name to "Franklin Cemetery" to honor the family of Benjamin Franklin, but the effort failed.

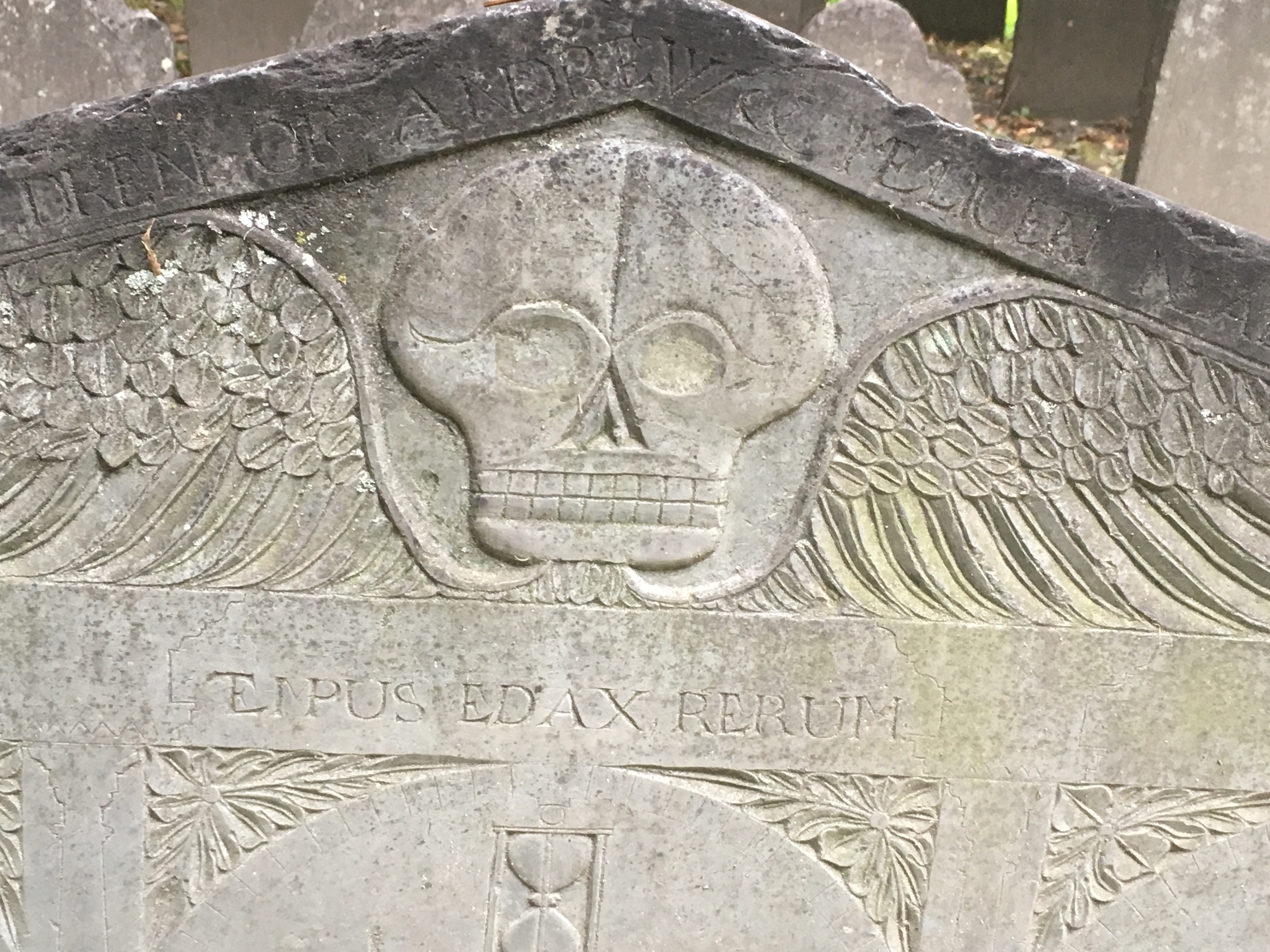
The headstone for Andrew Neil and family is dated 1666, making it the earliest dated marker in the graveyard.

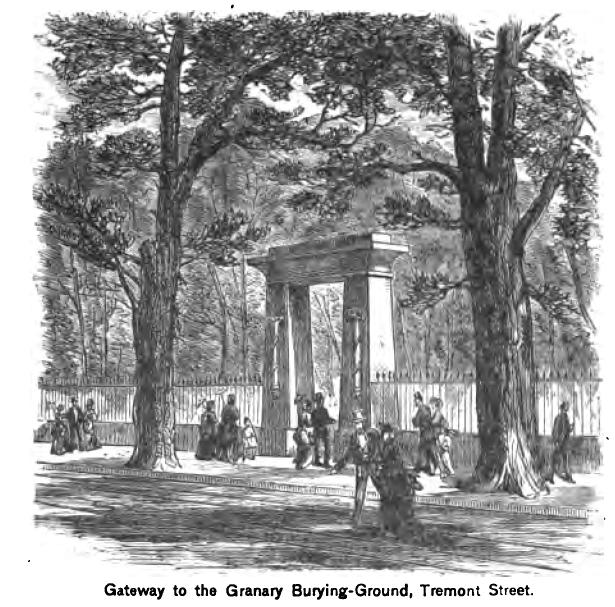
The entrance to the Granary Burying Ground as it appeared circa 1881 with the European Elms present

The Burying Ground was originally part of Boston Common, which then encompassed the entire block. The southwest portion of the block was taken for public buildings two years after the cemetery was established, which included the Granary and a house of correction. The north portion of the block was used for housing.

Tombs were initially placed near the back of the property. Puritan churches did not believe in religious icons or imagery, so the people of Boston used tombstones as an outlet for artistic expression of their beliefs about the afterlife. One of the most popular motifs was the "Soul Effigy," a skull or "death’s head" with a wing on each side, that represented the soul flying to heaven after death. On May 15, 1717, a vote was passed by the town to enlarge the Burying Ground, by taking part of the highway on the eastern side, now Tremont Street. The enlargement was carried out in 1720 when 15 tombs were created and assigned to a number of Boston families.

Eleven large European elms fronted it on Tremont Street. The elms were planted in 1762 by Major Adino Paddock and John Ballard and reached ten feet in circumference by 1856. The walk under the elms was known as "Paddock's Mall". The rest of the grounds were devoid of any trees. The first major improvement was undertaken in 1830, when a number of trees were planted around the grounds. In 1840, an iron fence was built on Tremont Street. The fence was designed by Boston architect Isaiah Rogers at a cost of $5,000, half paid by the city and half by public subscription. Rogers designed an identical Egyptian revival gateway for Newport's Touro Cemetery. In the mid-19th century, the ground's headstones were rearranged in neat rows to accommodate the use of early lawn mowers for maintenance.

In January 2009, a previously unknown crypt was discovered when a tourist on a self-guided tour of the cemetery fell through the ground into what appeared to be a stairway leading to a crypt. The stairway had been covered with a piece of slate, which gave way due to advanced age. The tourist was not hurt, nor did she come into contact with any human remains. The crypt is 8 by 12 feet and is structurally intact. It is possibly the resting place of Jonathan Armitage, a Boston selectman from 1732 to 1733.

In May 2011, Boston officials announced a $300,000 refurbishment project designed to repair and restore the historic site, including widening paths in the cemetery and providing new observation sites: $125,000 will be provided by the Freedom Trail Foundation and the city will pay the rest.

== Memorials and monuments ==
Prominently displayed in the Burying Ground is an obelisk erected in 1827 to the parents and relatives of Benjamin Franklin, who was born in Boston and is buried in Philadelphia. Franklin's father was Josiah Franklin, originally from Ecton, Northamptonshire, England. His mother was Abiah, who was born in Nantucket and was Josiah's second wife. Constructed of granite from the Bunker Hill Monument quarry, the obelisk was built to replace the original Franklin family gravestones which had been in poor condition. The new memorial was dedicated on 15 June 1827.

The second oldest memorial in the yard lies near the Franklin monument, memorializing John Wakefield, who died aged 52 in June 1667. The reason(s) for the seven-year gap between the establishment of the burying ground and the oldest memorial are unknown. The oldest stone is that of the Neal Children, carved by the 'Charlestown Carver', dating to 1666.

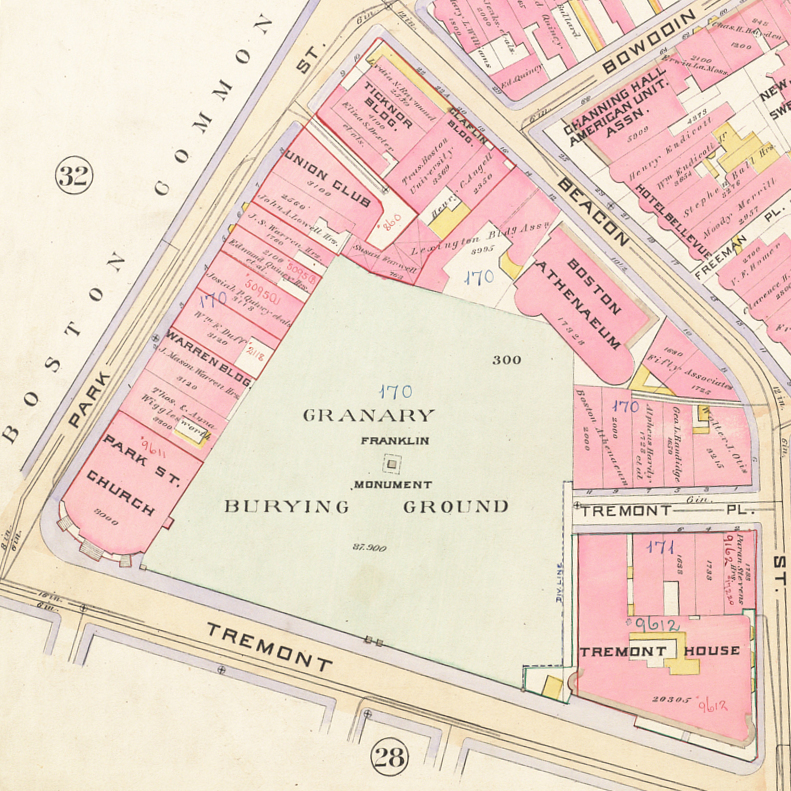
1888 map of the Granary Burying Ground from Atlas of the city of Boston

Interred near the Tremont Street entrance are the American casualties in the 1770 Boston Massacre. The grave markers were moved in the 1800s to be in straight lines, to conform to nineteenth century ideas of order, as well as to allow for more modern groundskeeping (i.e., the lawn mower).

== Burials ==
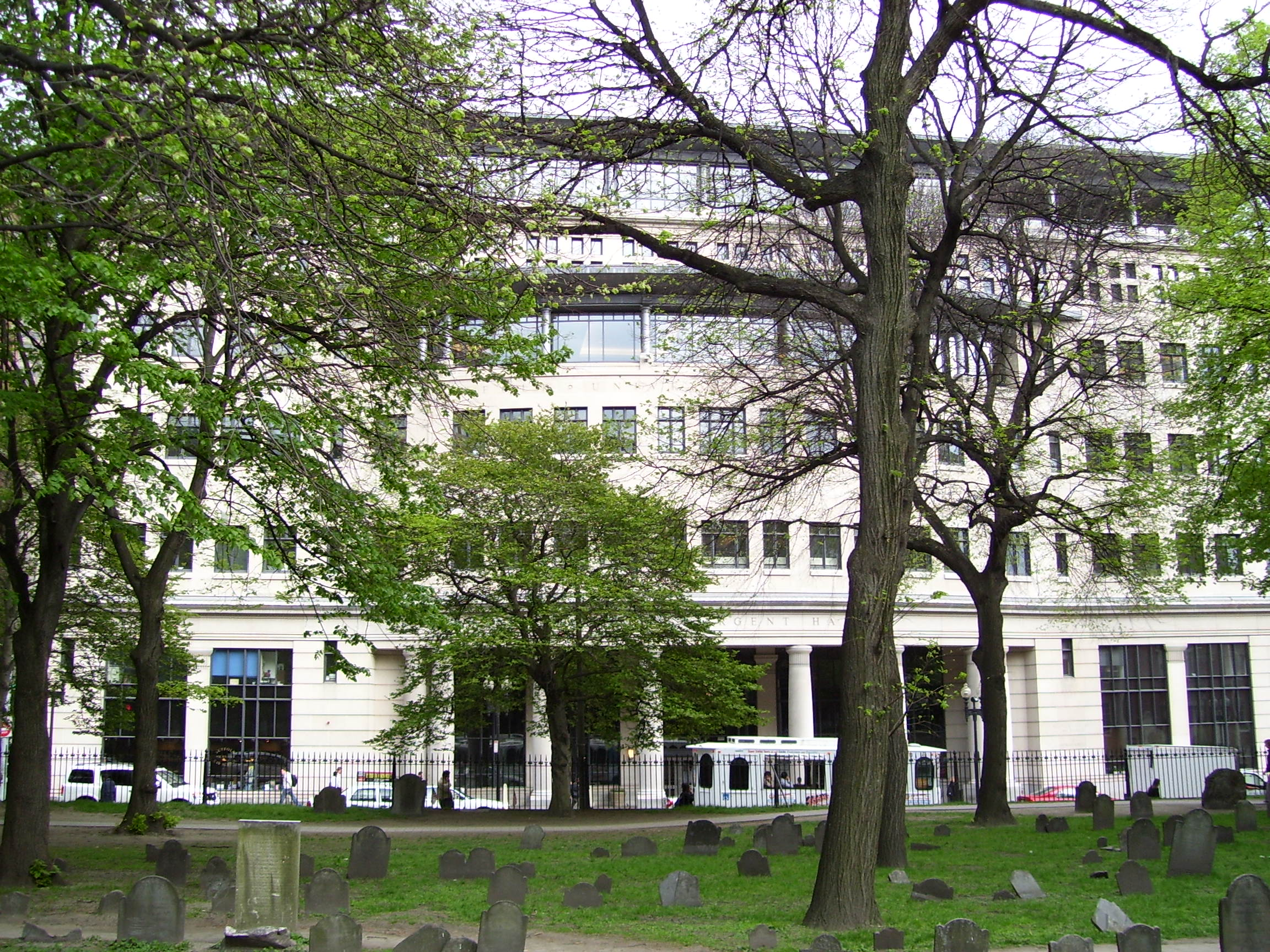
Granary Burying Ground with Suffolk Law School across the street, 2008

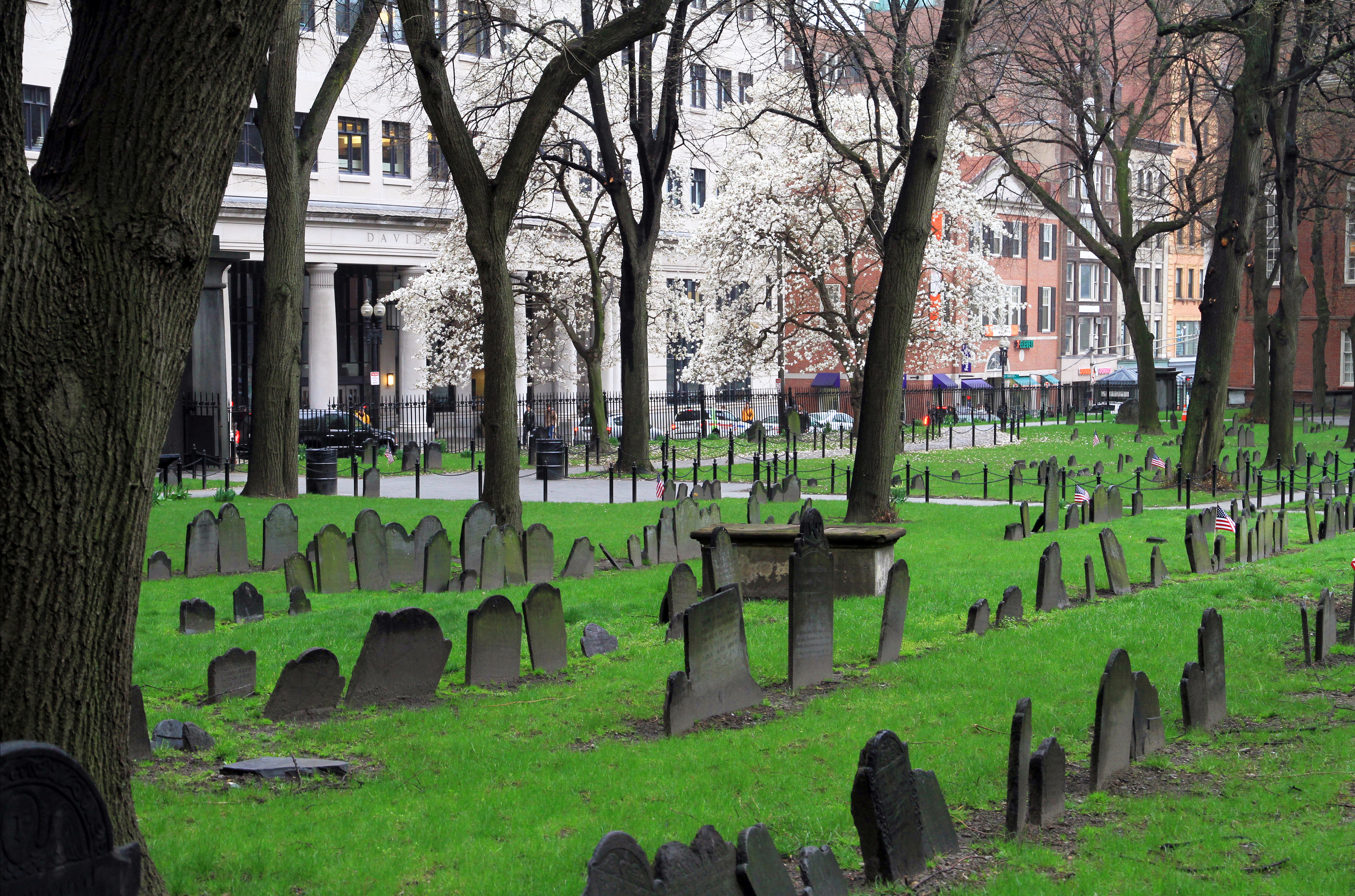
Granary Burying Ground

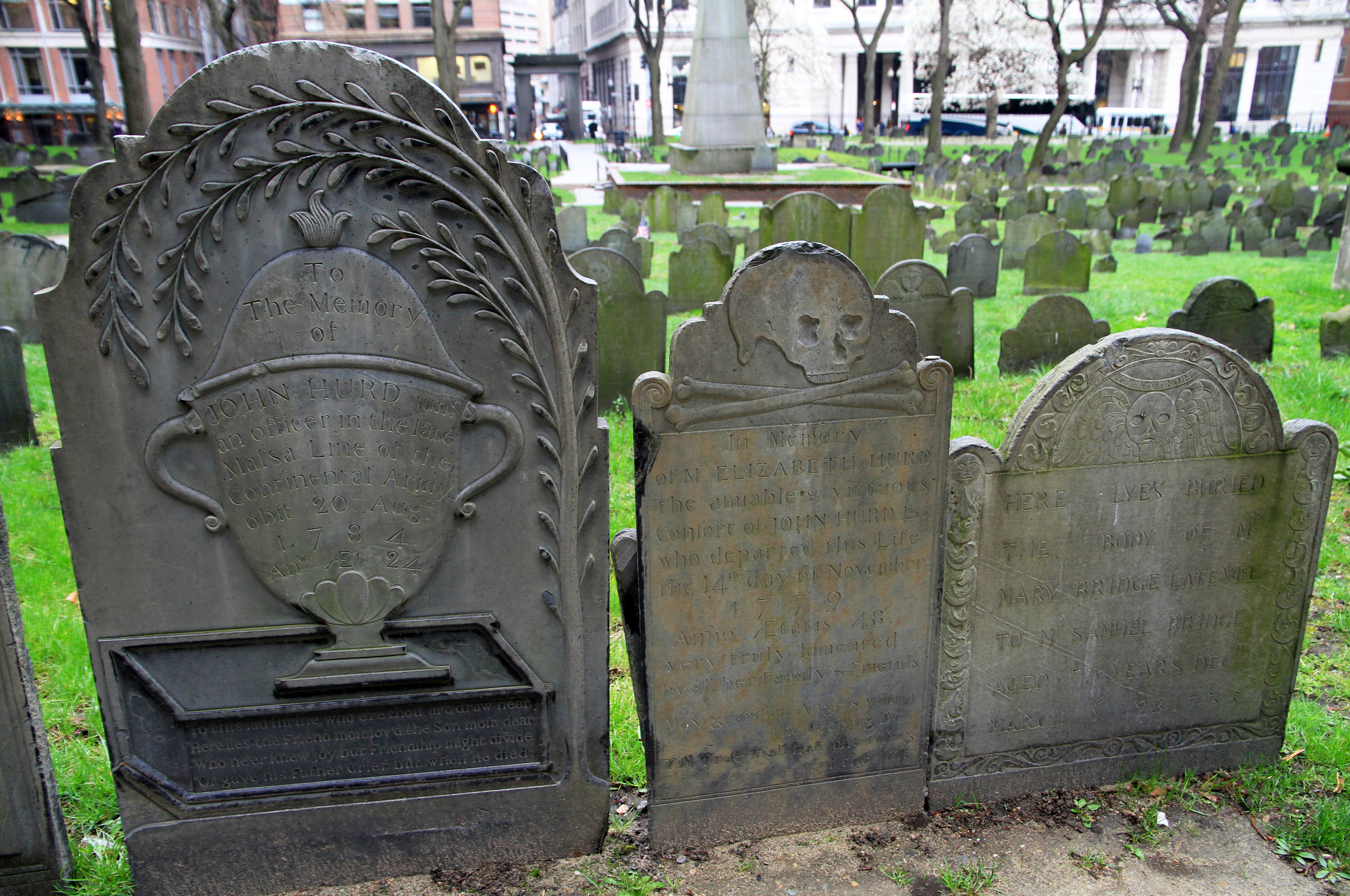
Gravestones in Granary Burying Ground

- Peter Boylston Adams (1738–1823), younger brother of second U.S. President John Adams and second cousin to Samuel Adams, he served as captain of the Braintree militia during the Revolutionary War. He was the older brother of Elihu Adams (1741–1775), who fought as a minuteman on the Concord Green in 1775. He died of dysentery while serving in the siege of Boston.
- Samuel Adams (1722–1803), statesman, signer of the Declaration of Independence, fourth governor of Massachusetts.
- Crispus Attucks (1723–1770), African-American victim of the Boston Massacre, in a common grave with the other four victims and Christopher Seider (sometimes Snider, 1758–1770), a boy killed eleven days before.
- James Bowdoin (1726–1790), prominent merchant, second governor of Massachusetts.
- Rev Mather Byles (1706–1788), prominent minister and loyalist in Tomb No. 2. Other members of his family buried here are daughters Mrs. Elizabeth [Byles] Brown; Miss Mary Byles; Miss Catherine Byles.
- John Endecott (c. 1588–1665), first governor of Massachusetts Bay Colony. His grave stone was destroyed and for many years it was thought – erroneously – that he was buried in the King’s Chapel Burying Ground. But evidence has proven conclusively that he was buried in tomb 189 of the Granary Burying Ground.
- Peter Faneuil (1700–1743), benefactor of Faneuil Hall.
- Josiah Franklin (1657–1745) and Abiah Folger (1667–1752), the parents of Benjamin Franklin, along with other members of the Franklin family. Franklin is buried at Christ Church Burial Ground in Philadelphia.
- Mary Goose (1665–1758), an unlikely claim familiar to locals as being the original Mother Goose. Some Mother Goose stories long predate the 17th century, the name Mother Goose was already familiar in France in 1650, and the first public appearance of Mother Goose stories in the New World was in 1786.
- Jeremiah Gridley (1702–1767), lawyer, defender of writs of assistance in 1761.
- John Hancock (1737–1793), statesman, signer of the Declaration of Independence, first governor of Massachusetts.
- John Hull, Judith Quincy Hull, Daniel Quincy; Hull-Quincy Tomb (Tomb 185).
- James Otis Jr. (1725–1783), lawyer, Revolutionary War Patriot.
- Robert Treat Paine (1731–1814), signer of the Declaration of Independence.
- Ebenezer Pemberton (1746–1835), American educator.
- John Phillips (1770–1823), first mayor of the city of Boston.
- Wendell Phillips (1811–1884), American abolitionist, advocate for Native Americans, orator, and attorney. Reburied at Milton Cemetery in 1886.
- Edward Rawson (1615–1693), first secretary of the Massachusetts Bay Colony (1650–1686).
- Paul Revere (1735–1818), silversmith, Revolutionary War Patriot.
- Samuel Sewall (1652–1730) Salem witch trials judge.
- John Smibert (1688–1751) Scottish-American artist.
- Cyprian Southack (1662–1745), cartographer and naval commander.
- Increase Sumner (1746–1799), Fifth Governor of Massachusetts.
- Nathan Webb, (1705–1772), pastored the first new Congregational Church in Massachusetts started during the Great Awakening period for over 41 years.
- The master of Phillis Wheatley (1753–1784), American slave and first African-American poet and first African-American woman to publish a book. The resting place of Wheatley is the Copp's Hill Burying Ground, in the North End of Boston.
- Benjamin Woodbridge (1708–1728), victim of the first duel fought in Boston.

== Gallery ==
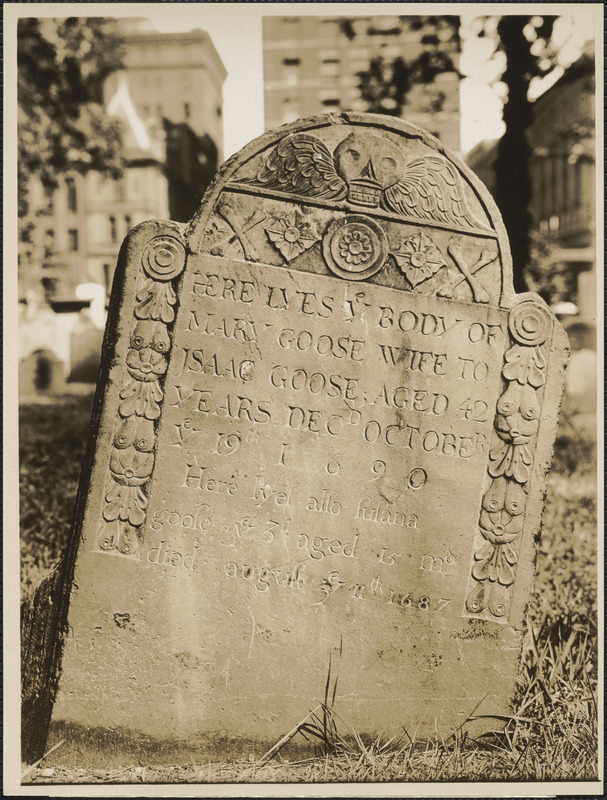
"Mother Goose", Granary Burying Ground, Boston, Mass., ca. 1920–1960.

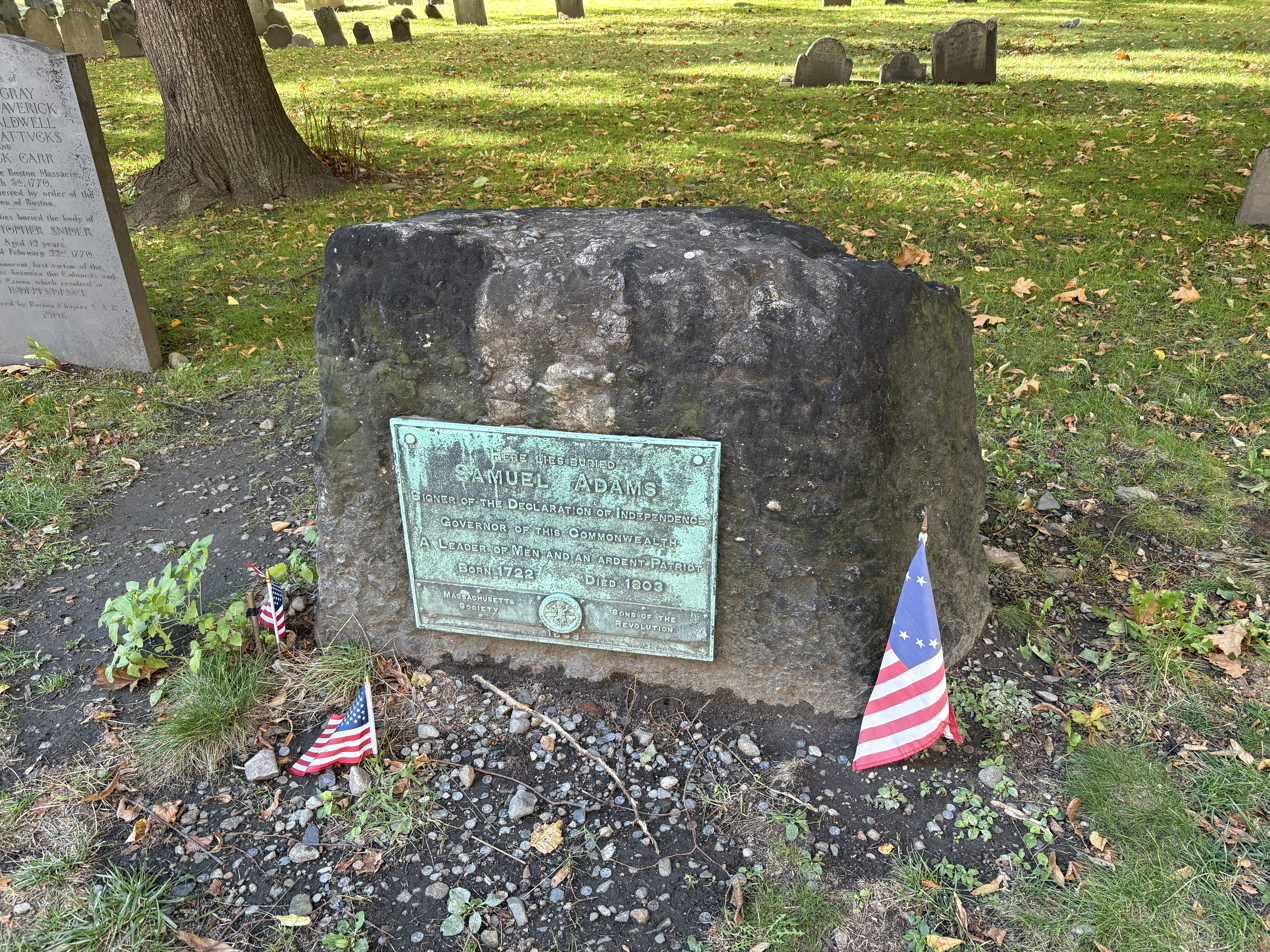
The grave of Samuel Adams.

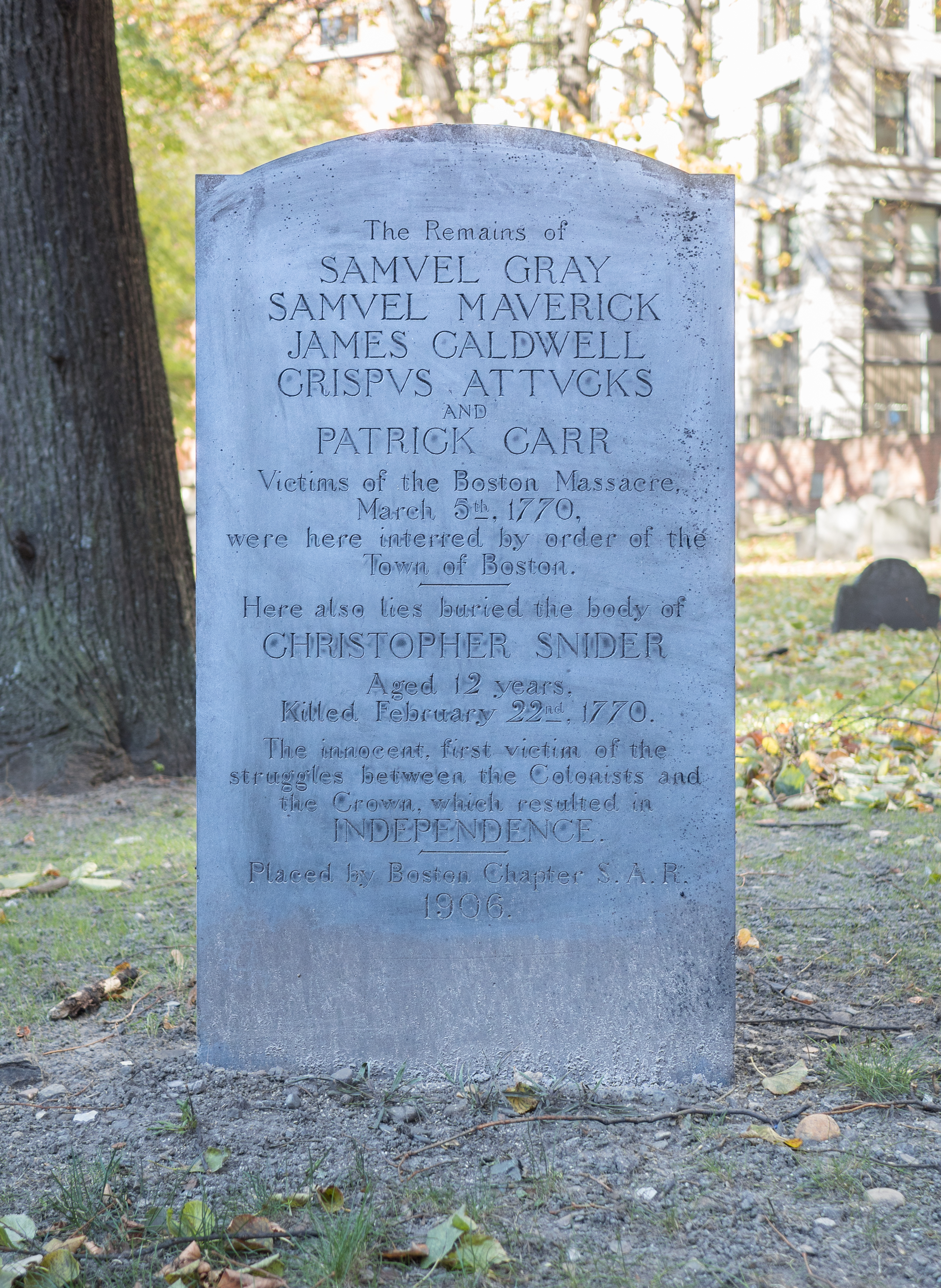
Grave of Crispus Attucks, Christopher Seider, and other victims of the Boston Massacre.

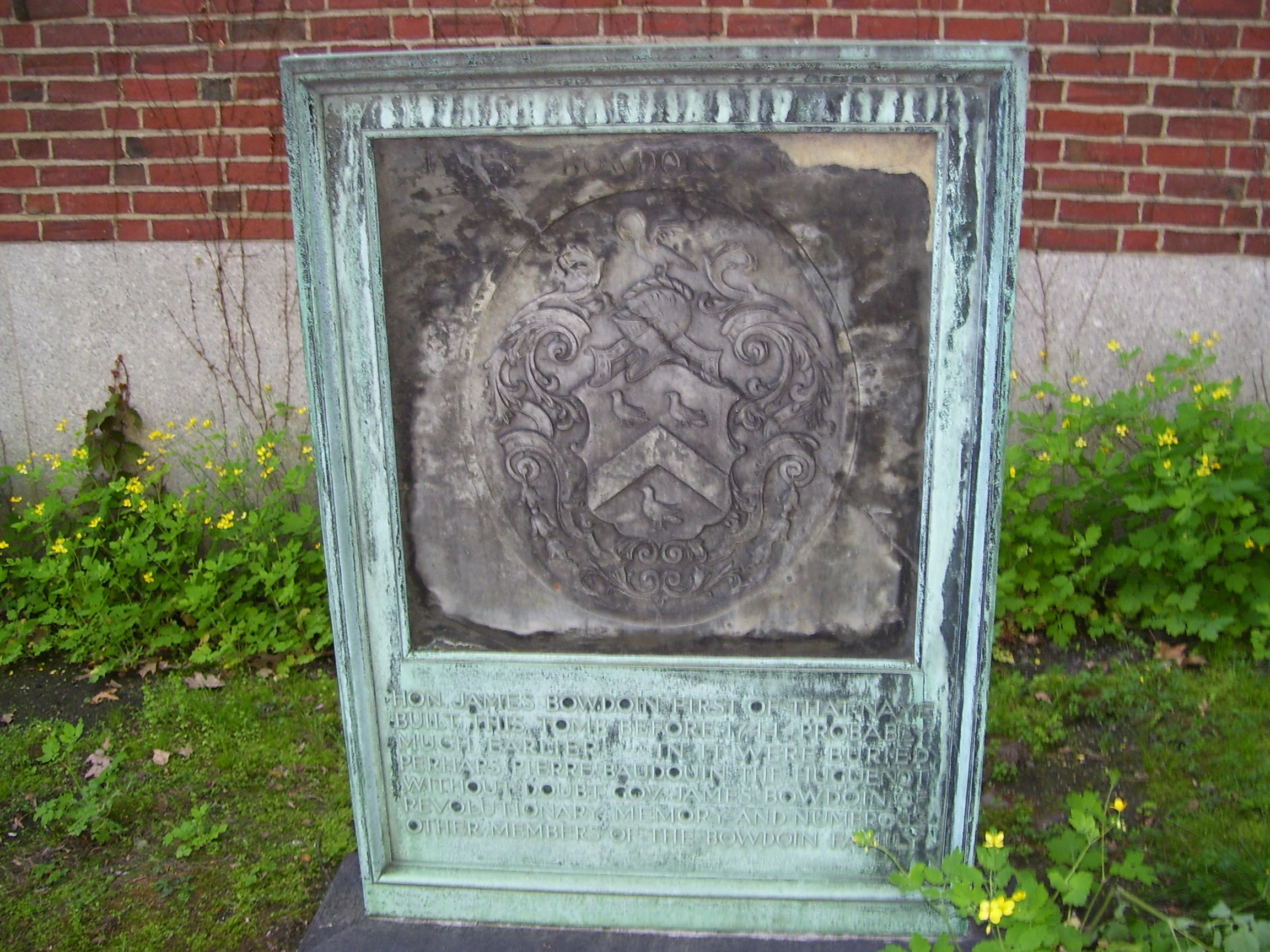
James Bowdoin's tomb

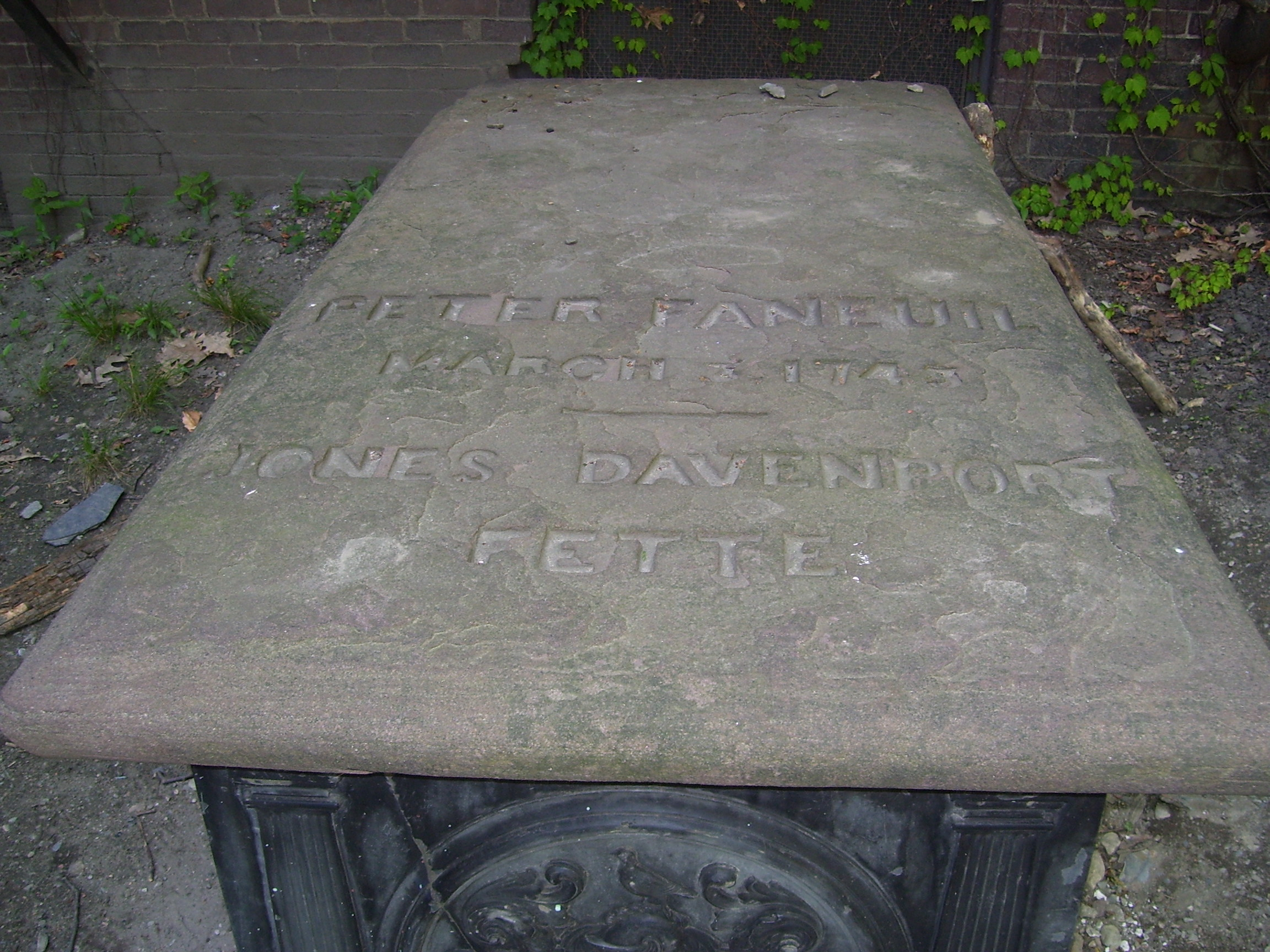
Peter Faneuil's tomb

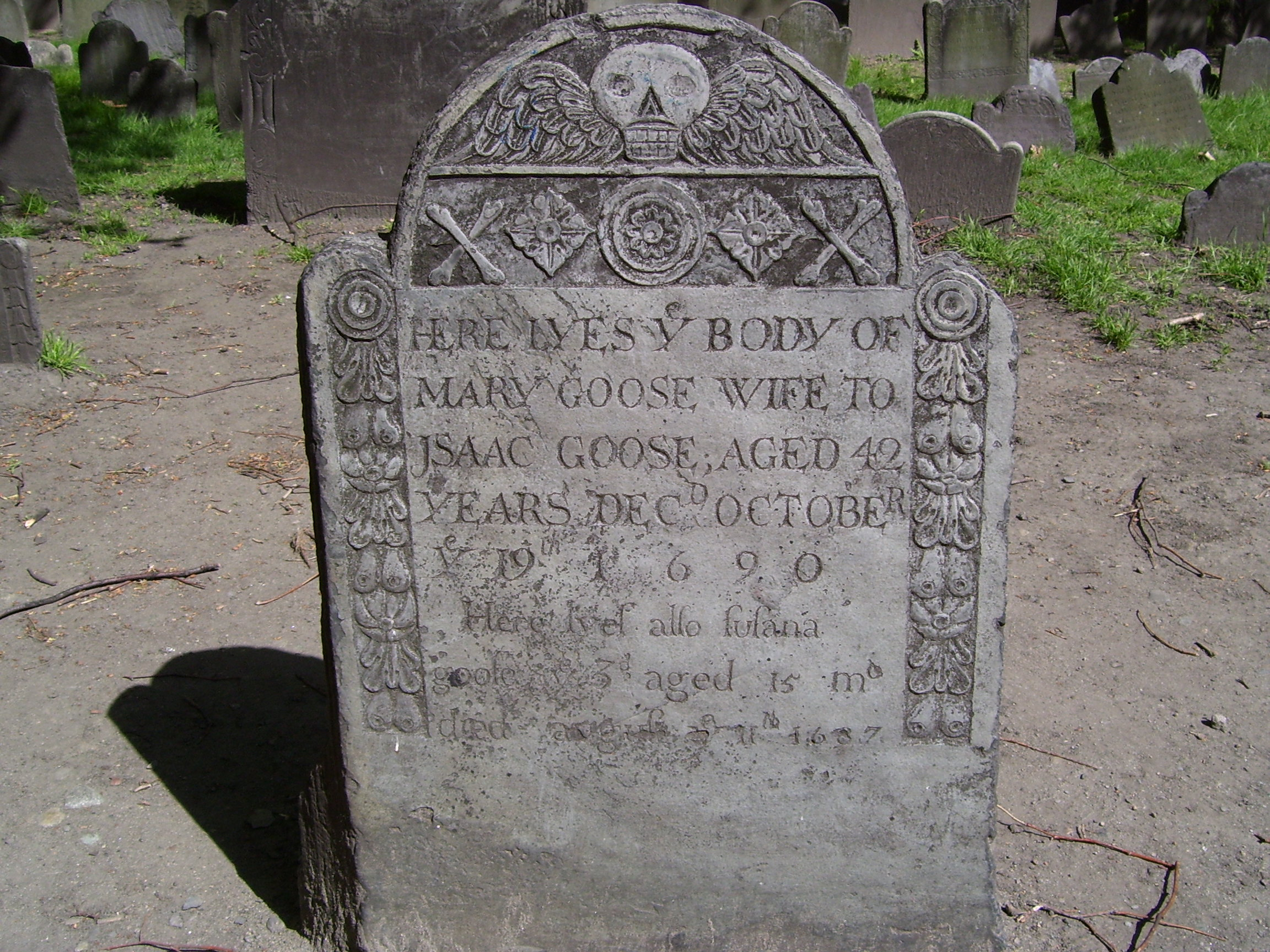
Mary Goose's grave

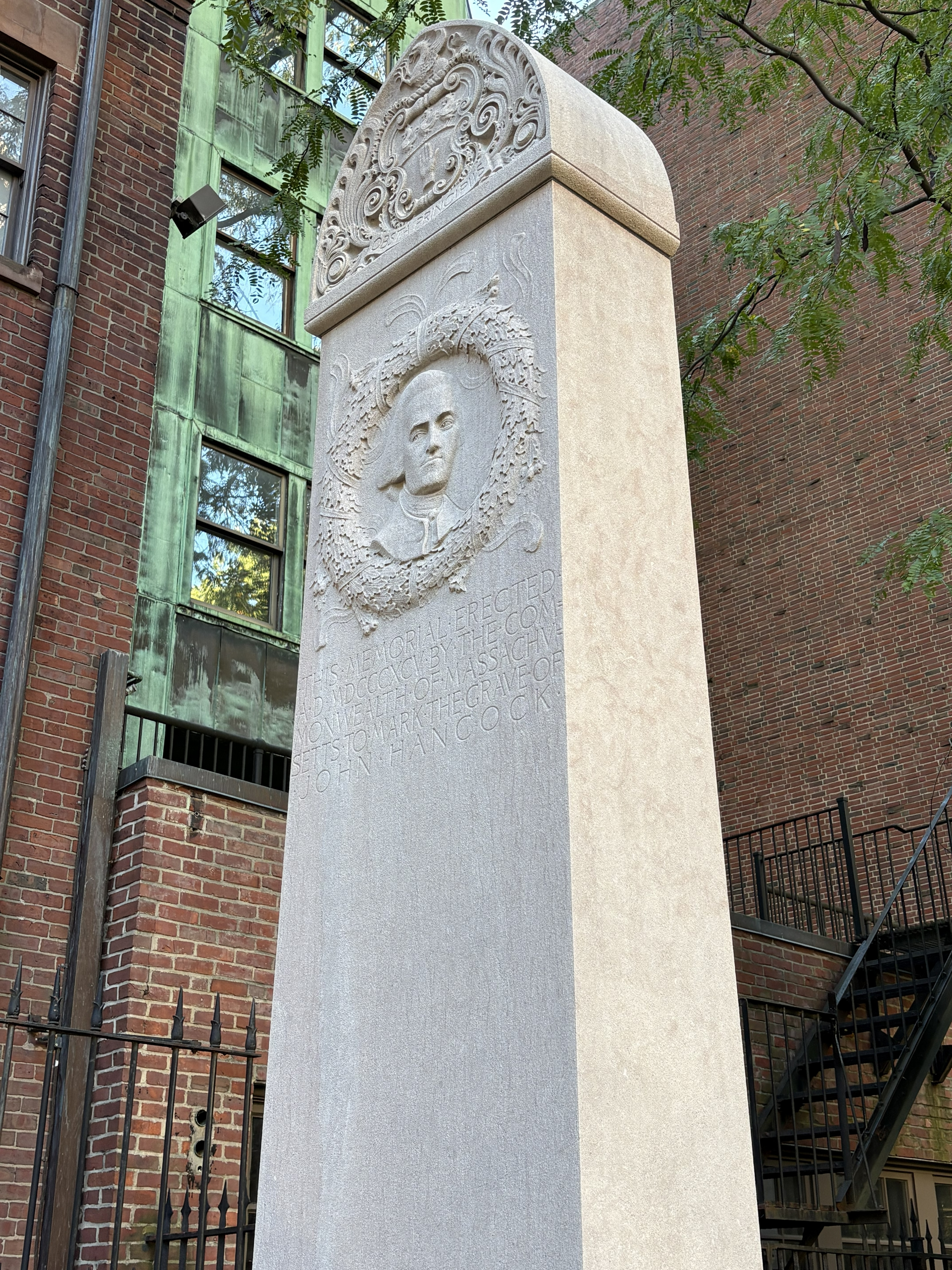
John Hancock memorial

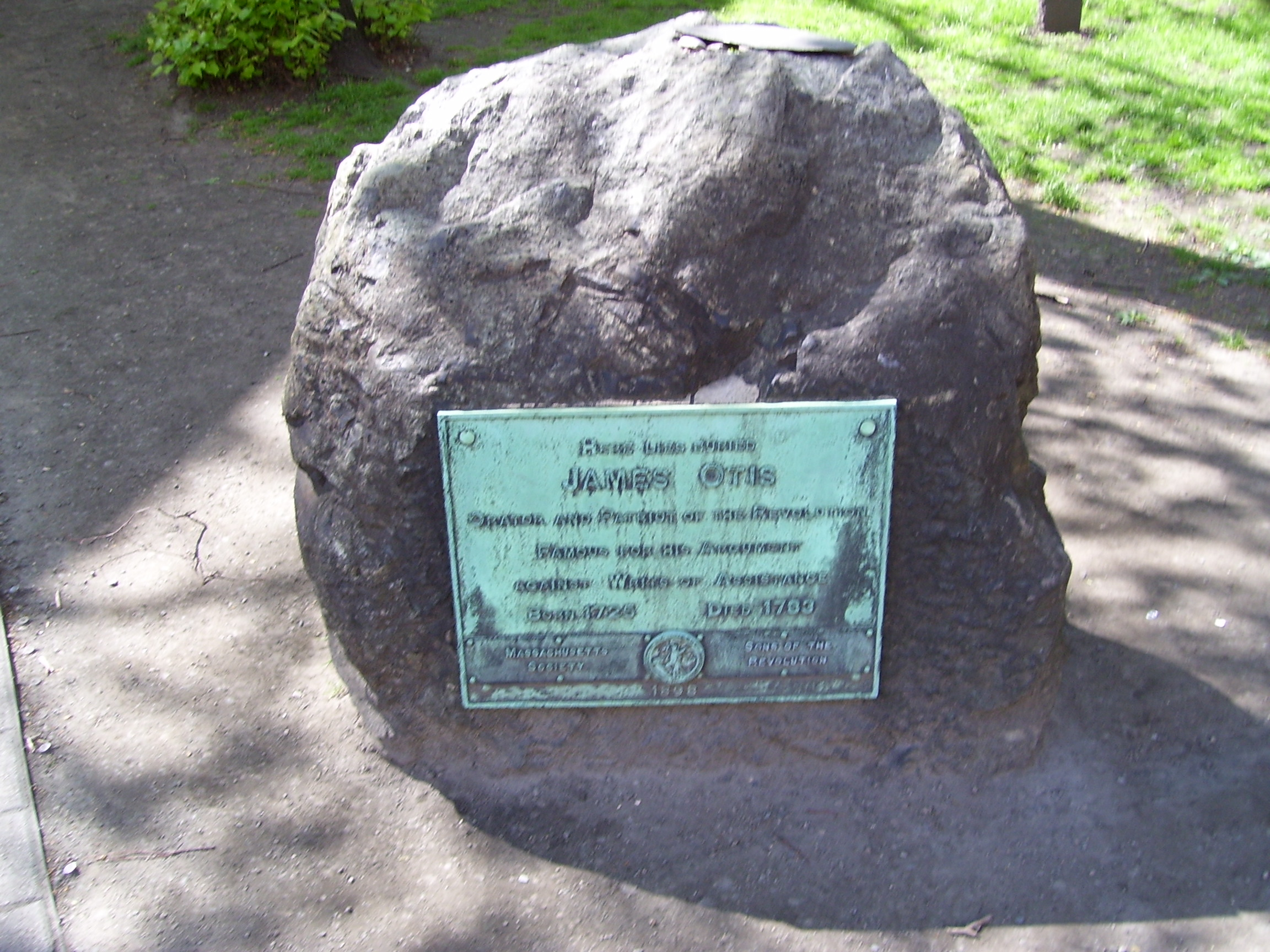
James Otis' grave

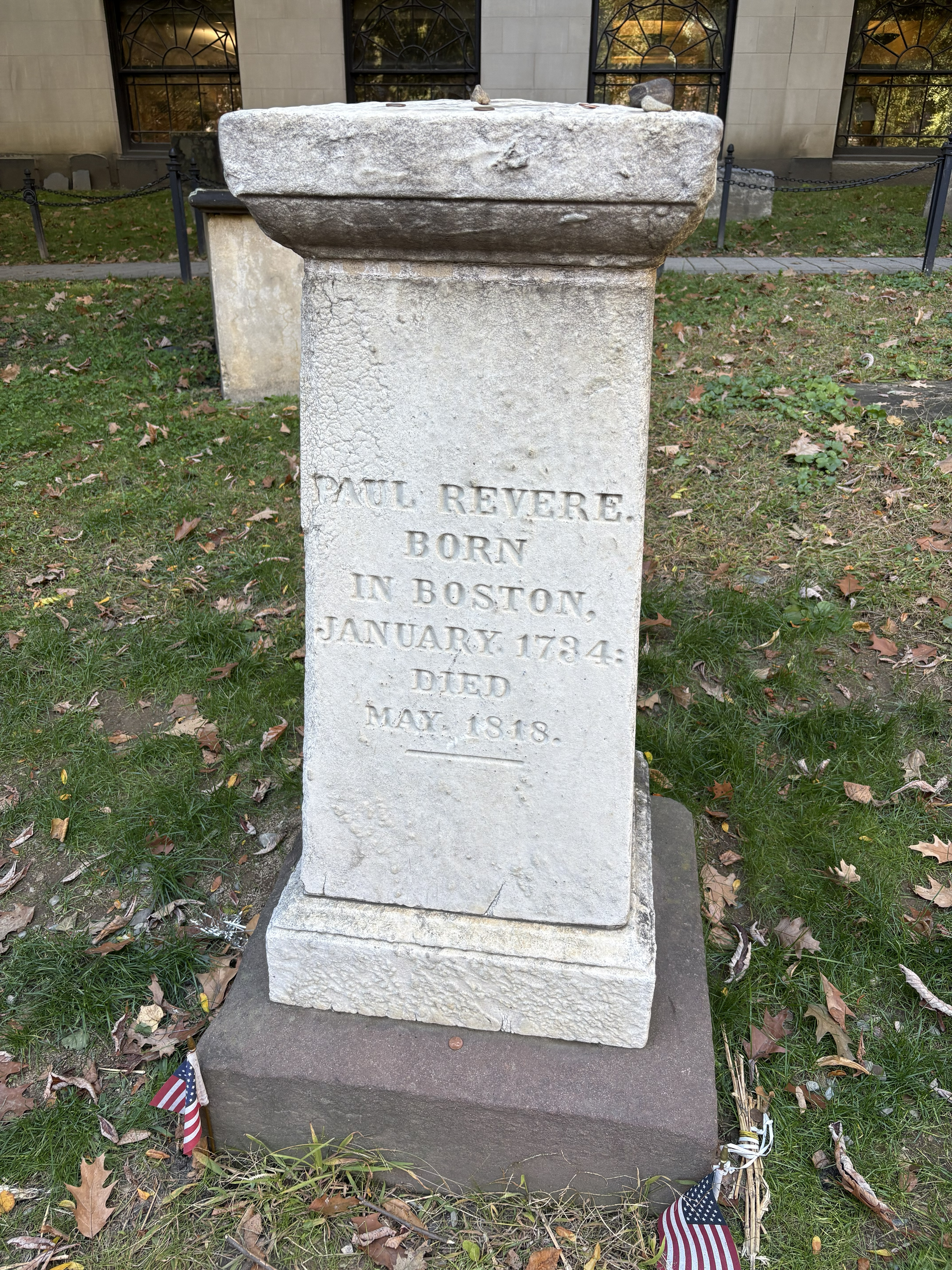
Paul Revere memorial

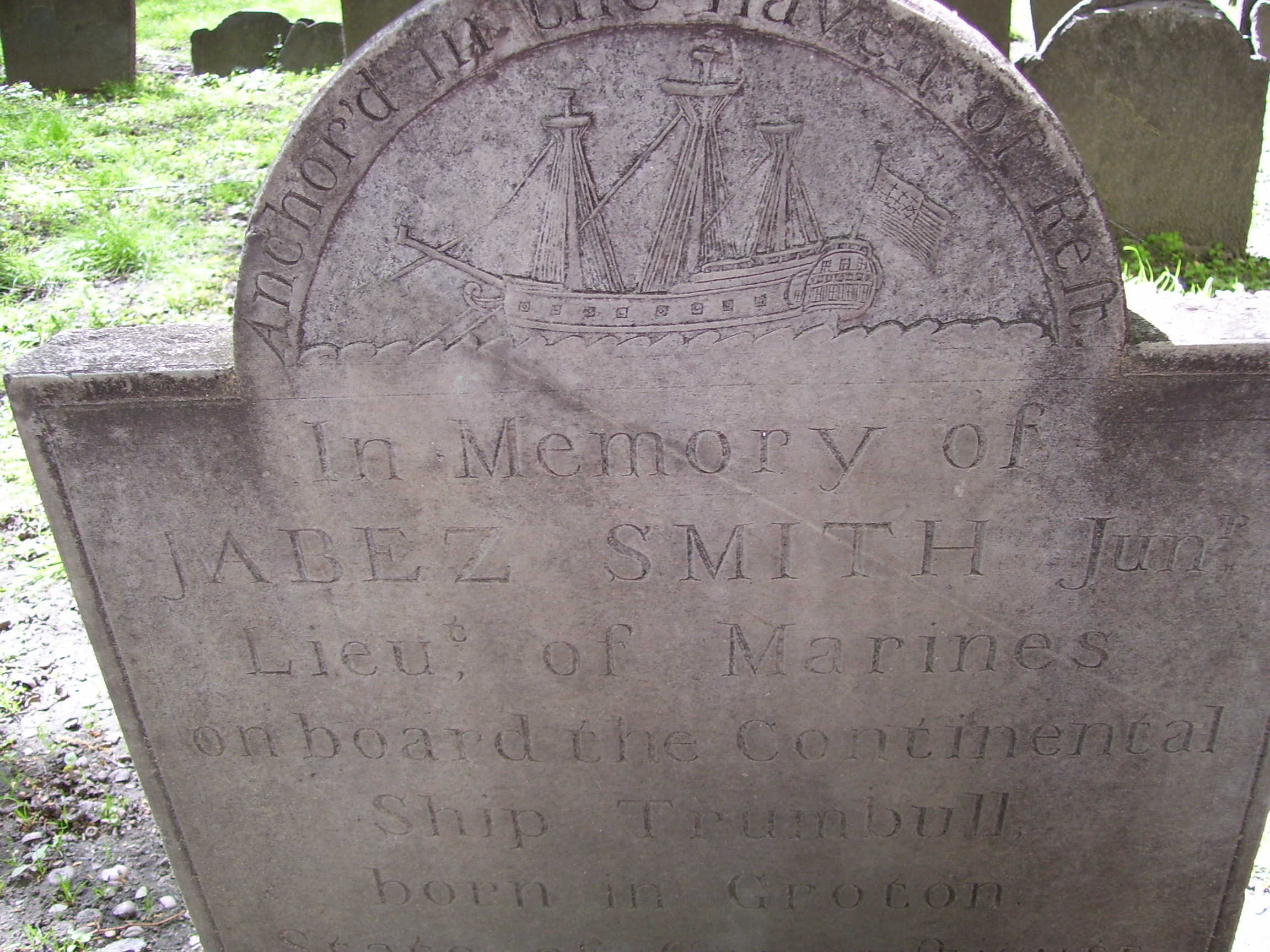
USS Trumbull (1776) depicted on the 1780 grave of Lt. Jabez Smith, killed aboard the ship.

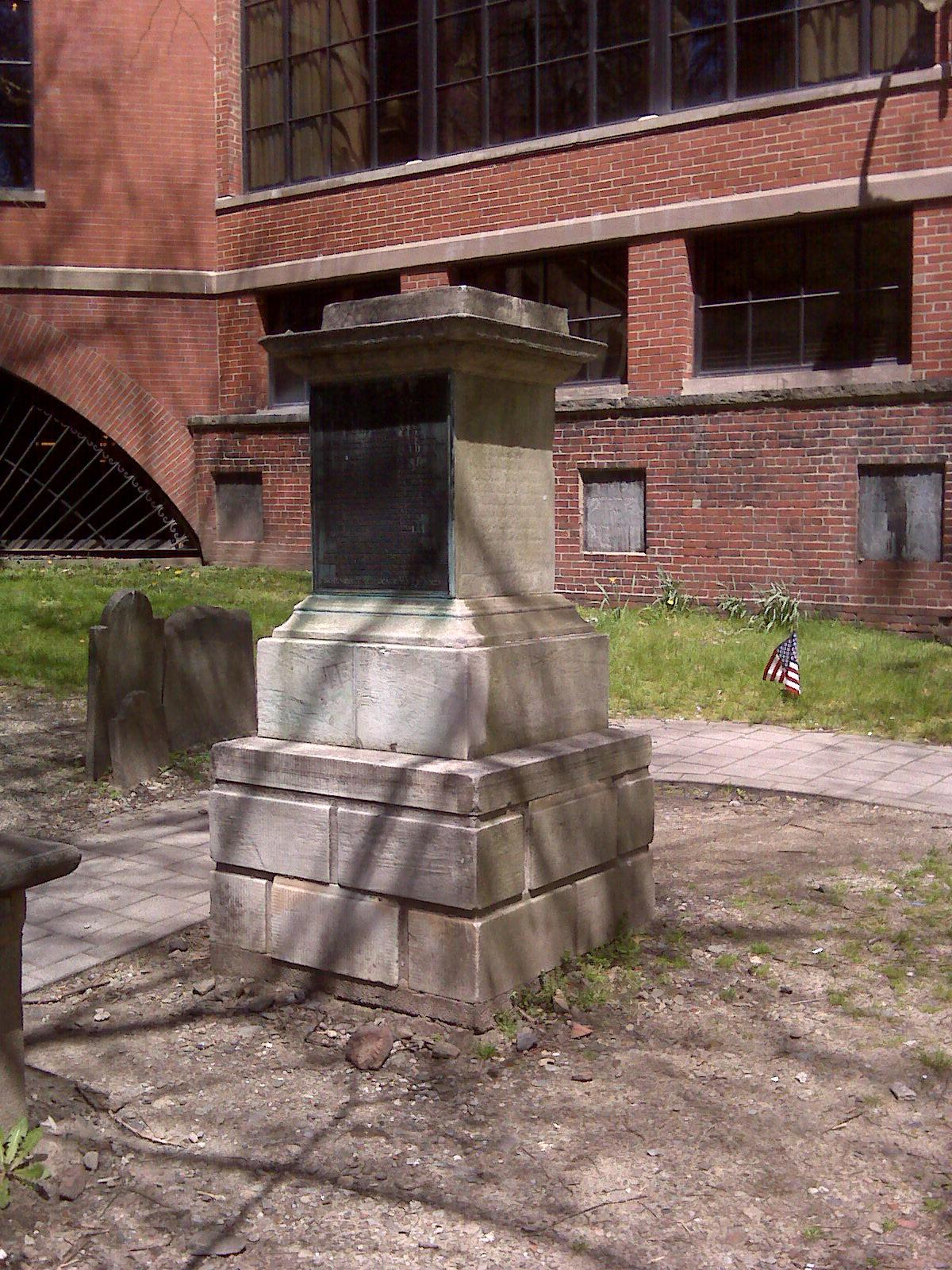
Grave of Increase Sumner, fifth Governor of Massachusetts.

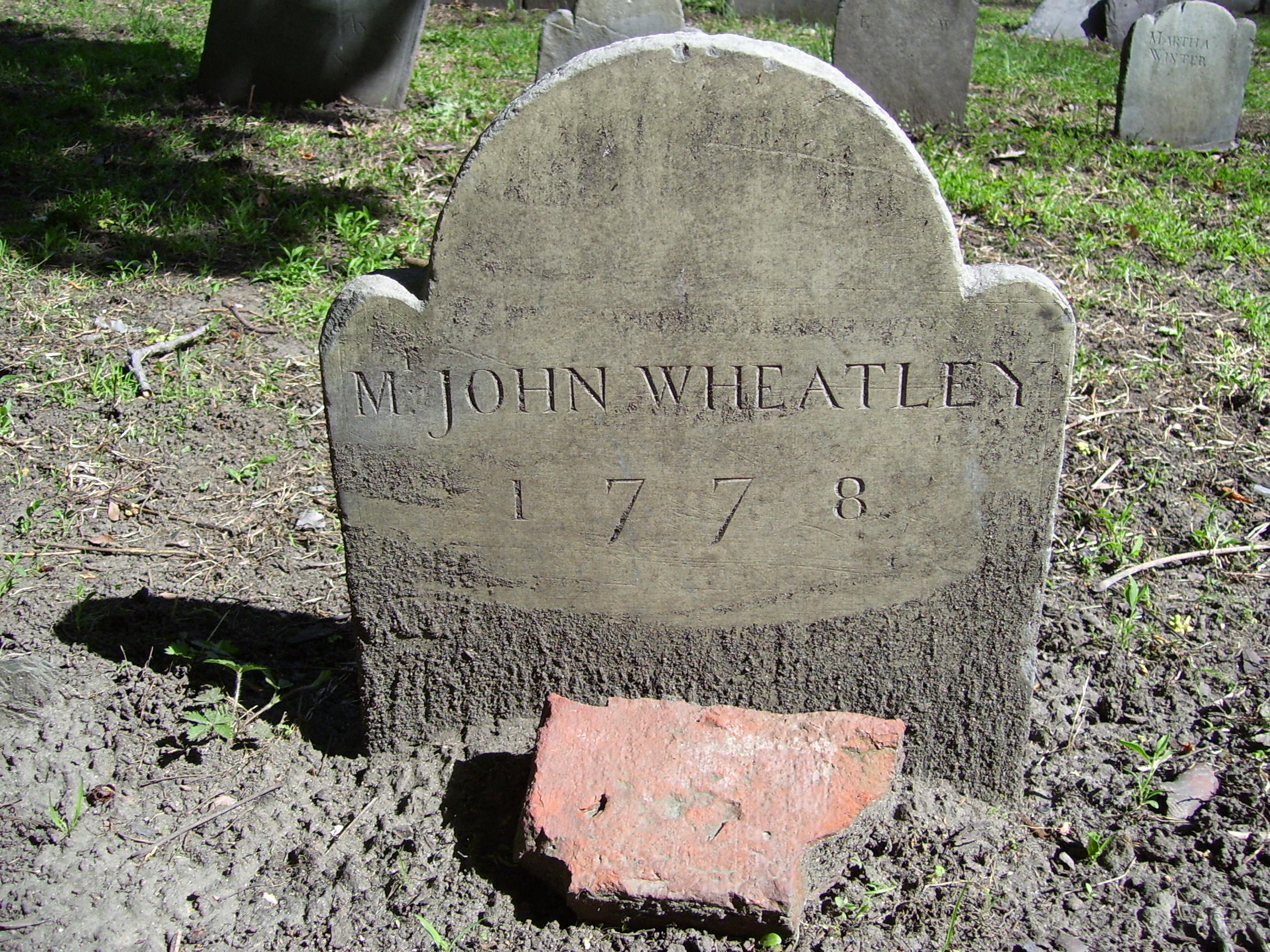
Grave of John Wheatley, owner of Phillis Wheatley.

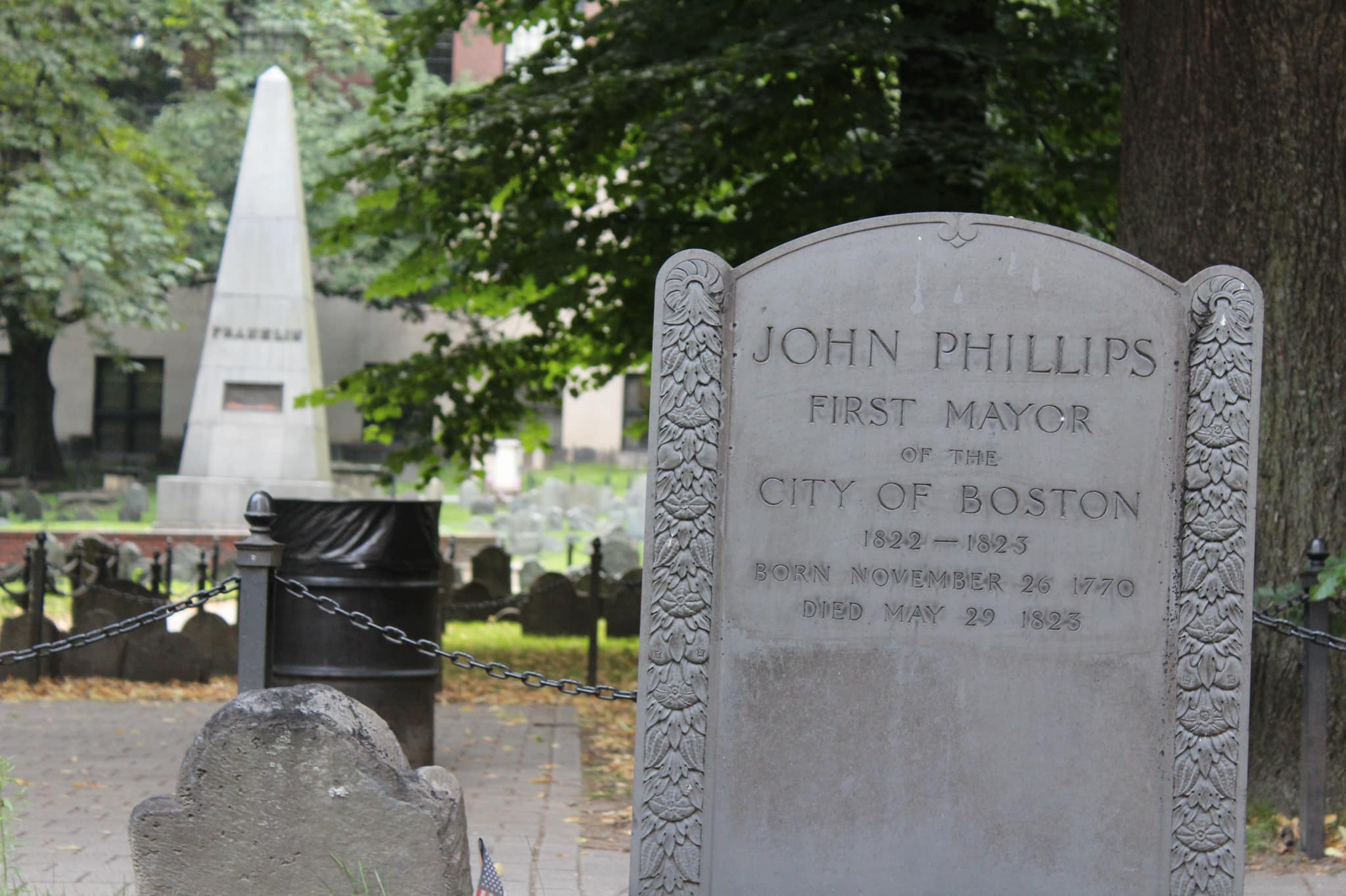
Grave of Boston's first mayor, John Phillips.

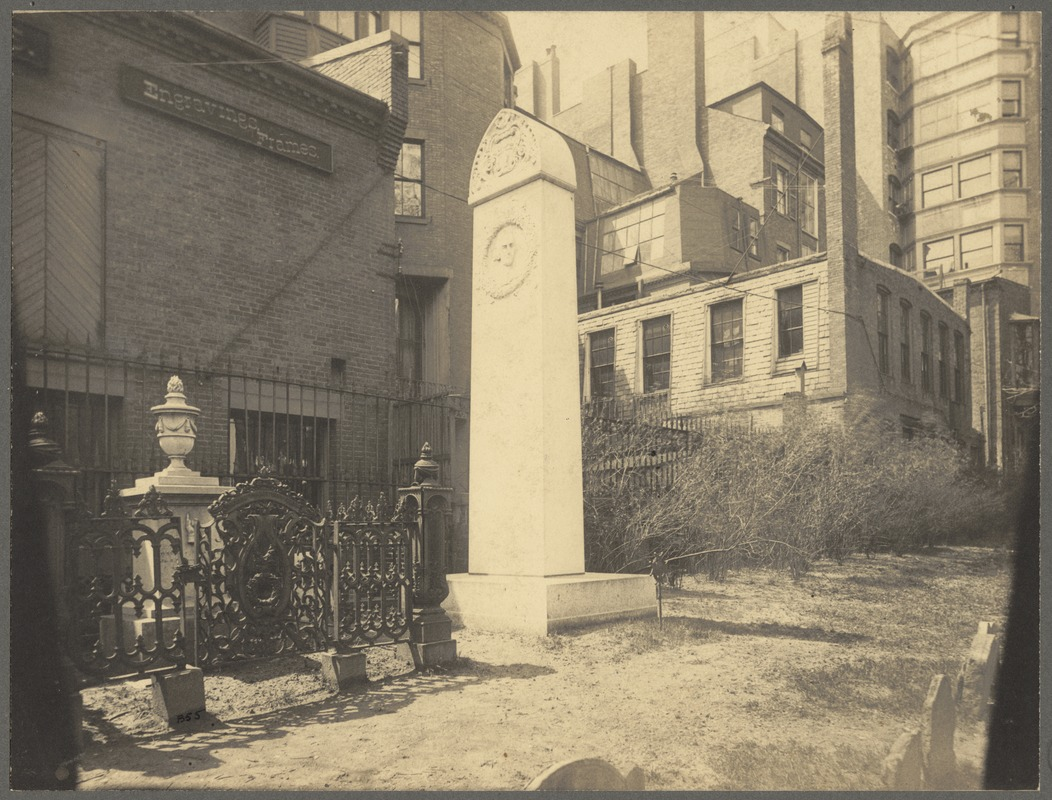
Old Granary Burying Ground showing Hancock monument, ca. 1898. Boston Pictorial Archive, Boston Public Library.

== See also ==
- Central Burying Ground, Boston
- Copp's Hill Burying Ground

== General sources ==
- Shurtleff, Nathaniel Bradstreet (1871). "Chapter XIV: Granary Burying-Ground". A Topographical and Historical Description of Boston. Boston: Boston City Council. pp. 210–226.

Preceded by Park Street Church	Locations along Boston's Freedom Trail; Granary Burying Ground	Succeeded by King's Chapel
