= Abiah Folger =

Mother of Benjamin Franklin

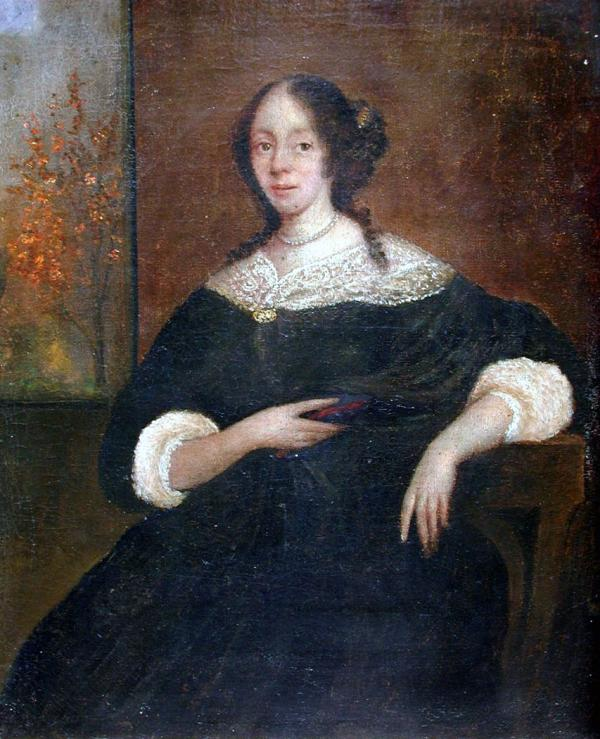
- Portrait, c. 1707
- Born: August 15, 1667; Nantucket, Massachusetts Bay Colony, English America
- Died: May 18, 1752 (aged 84); Boston, Province of Massachusetts Bay, British America
- Resting place: Granary Burying Ground
- Known for: Mother of Benjamin Franklin
- Spouse: Josiah Franklin
- Children: 10 children, including Benjamin, James, and Jane

Abiah Folger Franklin (August 15, 1667 – May 18, 1752) was the mother of Benjamin Franklin, a Founding Father of the United States.

== Biography ==
Abiah Folger was born on Madaket Road in Nantucket, Massachusetts, on August 15, 1667, to Peter Folger, a miller and schoolteacher, and his wife, Mary Morrell Folger, a former indentured servant. Her father, Peter Folger, was descended from reformist Flemish Protestants who had fled to England in the sixteenth century and been among the first to flee to Massachusetts for religious freedom in 1635, when King Charles I of England began persecuting Puritans. Later, Peter became a convert to Baptist Christianity, and Abiah was raised as a Baptist. Abiah was the youngest of Peter and Mary Folger's ten children.

At age 21 and unmarried, Abiah moved from Nantucket to Boston to live with an older sister and her husband, who were members of the Puritan South Church. Folger married Boston candle-maker and widower Josiah Franklin and they had 10 children. She raised her children with the Presbyterian religious tradition. Abiah and Josiah's children included John (born 1690), Peter (1692), Mary (1694), James (1696), Sarah (1699), Ebenezer (1701), a son who died young (1703), Benjamin (1706), Lydia (1708), and Jane (1712).

Abiah was an early supporter of her son Benjamin's career but not actively involved in politics. She disapproved of her son's membership in Freemasonry. Benjamin Franklin described his mother as “a discreet and virtuous woman” with “an excellent constitution."

== Influence on Benjamin ==
Historian Nick Bunker has described Abiah's influence on her son Benjamin. Bunker reports that "it was his mother who educated his feelings. By the time [Benjamin] was born, Abiah Franklin had raised so many children that she knew what she was doing when she had another... we cannot give a full account of the way she raised the boy, but we can at least be confident of this. It appears she did everything a parent should, giving him the right combination of attachment and liberty, now and then a touch of discipline, but mostly the time and the space for him to play creatively," and that "this is more or less what Franklin said himself, on the few occasions when he is known to have shared any secrets of their relationship."

In his later years, Franklin gave two accounts of his childhood: a very brief account in his autobiography and a less famous but richer account to a French medical student, Pierre-Jean-Georges Cabanis, whom he had befriended in 1779. Apparently Franklin "trusted the young French biologist [and] bared his soul to Cabanis, as he did to almost no one else. After their meetings in Paris, the Frenchman came away convinced that Abiah was the principal source of the virtues that her son displayed," writing, "It seems that his mother was a woman full of wisdom." One story told to Cabanis, Bunker reports, summed up her qualities especially well: As a child of about six years, Benjamin had been supplied by his parents with quite a few pennies for his visit to a fair in Boston. There, he handed over all his coins to buy a whistle that made a wonderful noise. Arriving home, Benjamin ran about the house blowing the whistle, and

His brothers and sisters laughed at the little boy when he told them how much he had given for his new toy. Benjamin burst into tears. [But] Mrs. Franklin gently pointed out that if he had been more careful and paid a fair price, he would have had money to spare for a drum, or a little cart to pull along. Benjamin... stood there in deep thought. "My friend," said Abiah, "when you buy a whistle, you should always know what it's going to cost. Here's my advice: every time you really want a thing, say to yourself first of all: how much is the whistle worth?" Franklin told Cabanis that he never forgot his mother's wise maxim. At moments of passion — or "violent désir," as the Frenchman put it... — Franklin would pause, and ask himself what price he might have to pay for the loss of self-control.

== Portrait in Benjamin's autobiography ==
The description of Abiah in Benjamin Franklin's Autobiography is very brief — only two sentences — and has been the focus of recent scholarship. Matthew Garrett wrote that "the Autobiography is perhaps the finest example within the modern narrative tradition of a text that habitually compresses major characters - those, that is, who play integral and significant roles within the plot - into minor players. Throughout the Autobiography, Franklin produces this narrative in order to produce himself.... But even by the standards Franklin sets in the rest of the Autobiography, his mother's diminution within the narrative discourse is extreme." He concludes that "Abiah's depiction corresponds to a repertoire of socially normative behavior, the nurturing role of mothers, that cannot be assimilated to Benjamin Franklin's representation of individual incentive in nearly every other sentence of his narrative.... she countenances no excuses for the narrative into which her two sentences arrive like a message from another world."

== Relations ==
Folger's sister Bethshua Folger Pope was an active and theatric participant in the events surrounding the Salem witch trials. Bethshua suffered "hysterical blindness" and convulsions, and in the middle of one trial, she threw a shoe at an accused person's head. Her accusations contributed to the death sentence of at least one convicted witch, Martha Corey. As a result, some popular dramatizations of the Salem trials have included Abiah as a character.

== Legacy ==
In 1898, the Daughters of the American Revolution established the Abiah Folger Franklin Chapter in Nantucket.

There is a monument with flowers growing in it to honor Folger on the right side of Madaket Road at the site of the Folger Farm, now owned by the Nantucket Historical Association.

== Media portrayals ==
A fictionalized version of Abiah appeared in the fourth episode of Voyagers!, titled "Agents of Satan," where the central characters prevented her from being hanged during the Salem witch trials.

Abiah was portrayed in a 2018 episode of the TV series Timeless. The episode was titled "The Salem Witch Hunt."
