= James Franklin (printer) =

American colonial author, printer, newspaper publisher, and almanac publisher

- Born: February 4, 1697; Boston, Province of Massachusetts Bay, English America
- Died: February 4, 1735 (aged 38); Newport, Colony of Rhode Island, British America
- Other name: "Poor Robin"
- Occupation: Newspaper/Almanac Printer/Publisher
- Notable credit(s): Publisher, New England Courant, one of the oldest and the first truly independent American newspaper
- Spouse: Ann Smith Franklin
- Children: 5
- Parents: Josiah Franklin (father); Abiah Folger (mother)

James Franklin (February 4, 1697 – February 4, 1735) was an early American printer, publisher and author of newspapers and almanacs in the American colonies. He published the New England Courant, one of the oldest and the first truly independent American newspapers, and the short-lived Rhode Island Gazette.

== Early years ==
Born in Boston, Province of Massachusetts Bay, in 1697, James was an older brother of Benjamin Franklin and the son of Josiah Franklin, a chandler and businessman from Ecton, Northamptonshire, England, and Abiah Folger, who came from a family of Nantucket Puritans. In addition to James, their children included: John (1690–1756), Peter (1692–1766), Mary (1694–ca. 1730), Sarah (1699–1731), Ebenezer (1701–1702), Thomas (1703–1706), Benjamin (1706–1790), Lydia (1708–1758), and Jane (1712–1794). James had seven other siblings from his father's earlier marriage.

James married Ann Smith, who came from a Puritan family, in 1723, on his 26th birthday. The wedding, in Boston, was performed by the Rev. John Webb of the New North Church. James Franklin was married to Ann Franklin and together that had a son, James Franklin Jr. who took over his father's newspaper, The Rhode-Island Gazette when his father died.

== Career ==
James Franklin learned the printer's trade in England, thereafter returning to the American colonies in March 1717, bringing with him his own printing Ramage press and printer's type. to start in the printing trade, and younger brother, Benjamin, became indentured to him.

Soon he began publishing in 1719 while working for The Boston Gazette. After being replaced by Samuel Kneeland as its printer he established The New-England Courant in Boston in 1721 with wife, Ann, and brother, Benjamin, working alongside him. While at the Courant, James gathered a group, referred to by some as "The Hell-Fire Club", for assistance. In response, Thomas Walter, a Boston preacher, countered by writing a scathing piece entitled, "The Anti- Courant". James, however, saw this as an opportunity to further promote his newspaper and published Walter's editorial piece, with a note that his Courant would ascribe to a neutral editorial policy.

Franklin, by means of his New-England Courant, boldly criticized Boston's religious orthodoxy on two fronts. First, he introduced the fashions of English literary journalism, commonly referred to as "yellow journalism", to American journalism. To this end he printed humorous and provocative essays with the intention of reforming the towns social mannerisms. This marked the first time Boston was subjected to a competing moral voice that challenged that of the pulpit. Among them was the publication of essays by "Silence Dogood", which, unbeknownst to James, were actually authored by his younger brother, Benjamin Franklin. Secondly, he openly criticized what was assumed to be the dangerous procedure of smallpox inoculation, while some prominent ministers, like Cotton Mather, supported the measure, while most of the citizenry of Boston were fearful of the practice. As such the Courant was considered very controversial, and James was imprisoned for four weeks in 1722 for writing "scandalous libel". The paper was suppressed in 1727 and James and Ann left Boston in the same year.

At the invitation of James's brother, John, a tallow chandler, James and Ann moved to Newport. Here, they had five children, including Mary, Elizabeth, and James Jr. Here, too, James and Ann established the first printing press in the colony of Rhode Island.

Starting in 1727, James printed and published eight editions of the Rhode-Island Almanack, sometimes under the pseudonym "Poor Robin". They were printed in James' shop near the town schoolhouse, or at his printing-house on Tillinghast's Wharf, near the Union-Flag Tavern. With the assistance of Thomas Fleet, the almanacs were sold as far away as Pudding-Lane in Boston.

On September 27, 1732, James published the first issue of the Rhode Island Gazette, 12 inches (30 cm) by 8.5 inches (22 cm) in size. Its run lasted only until May 24, 1733, and its issues were irregular.

== Later years ==
James was ill while living in Newport, but before his death, his brother Benjamin Franklin came for a visit. When Benjamin left for Philadelphia, he had with him his nephew, James Jr., and provided him with a printing apprenticeship thereafter. After a long illness, James died in Newport in 1735, on his 38th birthday and 12th wedding anniversary. James Franklin was buried in the Newport Common Burying Ground and Island Cemetery. He was survived by Ann, leaving her with four young children to support alone, one child having preceded James in death.

Ann continued to operate the printing business until her death in 1763, publishing under the imprint of "The Widow Franklin", and producing books, almanacs, pamphlets, and legal announcements.

== See also ==
- Early American publishers and printers
- List of early American publishers and printers
- Museum of Newport History, where Franklin's printing press is on display

== Bibliography ==
- Fireoved, Joseph (Winter 1985). "Nathaniel Gardner and the "New-England Courant"". Early American Literature. 20 (3). University of North Carolina Press: 214–235. JSTOR 25055558.
- Field, Edward (1902). State of Rhode Island and Providence Plantations at the End of the Century: A History. Mason Pub. Co. pp. 564. "James Franklin brother John."
- Isaacson, Walter (2003). Benjamin Franklin: An American Life. New York: Simon & Schuster. ISBN 978-0-7432-5807-4.
- Mays, Dorothy A. (2004). Women in Early America: Struggle, Survival, and Freedom in a New World. Santa Barbara, Calif: ABC-CLIO. ISBN 1-85109-429-6.
- Wroth, Lawrence C. (1938). The Colonial Printer. The Southworth-Anthoensen press. p. 22.
- Franklin, James (1911). The Rhode-Island Almanack for the year, 1728. Being the first ever printed in that colony ... reproduced in exact facsimile ... with a brief account of James Franklin the printer ... Providence, R.I.: John Carter Brown library. p. 6. OCLC 68137848. Google link
- "The Story of the New-England Courant Apprenticeship". ushistory.org. Archived from the original on 2008-12-05.

=== Further reading ===
Newspapers

- —, & Franklin, B. (1721). The New-England Courant. Boston [Mass.]: J. Franklin. OCLC 2264838
- (1732). The Rhode-Island gazette. Newport, R.I.: James Franklin. OCLC 2267192

Almanacs

- (1727). The Rhode-Island Almanack. For the year, 1728. Being bissextile, or leap-year. Carefully fitted, and exact- [sic] calculated to the meridian of Newport on Rhode-Island; whose latitude north is 41 gr. 30 m. longitude from London 72 grs. But may without sensible error, serve all parts of New-England. Being the first ever published for that meridian. OCLC 70091122
- —, & Fleet, T. (1728). The Rhode-Island almanack, for the year, 1729.: ... Carefully fitted, and exactly calculated to the meridian of Newport on Rhode Island; whose latitude north is 41 gr. 30 m. longitude from London, 72 grs. But may without sensible error serve all parts of New-England.
- (1729). The Rhode-Island almanack, for the year, 1730. Being the second year after leap year. Carefully fitted, and exactly calculated to the meridian of Newport on Rhode-Island, whose latitude north is 41 gr. 30 m. longitude from London, 72 grs. But may without sensible error serve all parts of New-England. OCLC 62819621
- (1730). A Perpetual almanack: Shewing, the prime, epact, cycle of the sun, dominical letter, moon's age, high water, day of the month, day of the week, what days of the month all the Sundays, Mondays, Tuesdays, Wednesdays, &c. in any month of any year, fall on, leap year, moon's southing, sun rise, sun set, length of day, length of night, moveable and fixed feasts of the Church of England, and remarkable days for ever, &c. OCLC 62872886
- (1731). The Rhode-Island almanack, for the year, 1732.: ... Fitted to the meridian of Newport, on Rhode-Island, whose latitude north is 41 gr. 30 m. longitude from London, 72 grs. OCLC 207876015
- —, & Fleet, T. (1732). The Rhode-Island almanack for the year, 1733.: ... Fitted to the meridian of Newport, on Rhode-Island, whose latitude north is 41 gr. 30 m. longitude from London, 72 grs. OCLC 207876063
- —, & Fleet, T. (1733). The Rhode-Island almanack for the year, 1734.: ... Fitted to the meridian of Newport, on Rhode-Island, whose latitude north is 41 gr. 30 m. longitude from London, 72 grs. Newport [R.I.]: OCLC 207876120
- (1734). The Rhode Island almanack for the year, 1735. ... Fitted to the meridian of Newport, on Rhode-Island, whose latitude north is 41 gr. 30 m. longitude from London, 72 grs. Newport [R.I.]: Printed and sold by J. Franklin, at his printing-house under the town school-house. Sold also by T. Fleet, at the Heart and Crown in Cornhill, Boston. OCLC 62819625

Printed by James Franklin in Newport, for the colony of Rhode Island, and sold at his shop near the town schoolhouse

- (1730). Acts and laws, of His Majesty's Colony of Rhode-Island, and Providence-Plantations, in America. OCLC 5808746
- (1730). The charter granted by His Majesty King Charles the Second, to the Colony of Rhode Island, and Providence-Plantations, in America. OCLC 191270379
- (1731). Laws, made and pass'd by the General Assembly of His Majesty's colony of Rhode-Island and Providence Plantations, in New-England,: Held at Newport, on the first Wednesday of May, 1730. OCLC 191270407

Other works

- (1718). Divine examples of God's severe judgments upon Sabbath breakers, in their unlawful sports, Collected out of several divine subjects, viz. Mr. H.B. Mr. Beard, and the Practice of Piety: a fit monument for our present times, etc. Boston in New-England: Re-printed and sold in Newbury-Street [by Bartholomew Green?]. OCLC 4795117
- (1722). Hoop-petticoats arraigned and condemned by the light of nature, and law of God. Boston: Printed and sold by James Franklin, in Queen-street. OCLC 7198819
- (1726). The life and death of Old Father Janus, the vile author of the late wicked Courant A satyr. Boston: Printed and sold by J. Franklin in Union-Street. OCLC 55831518
