= Peter Folger (Nantucket settler) =

Colonial Era American poet

- Born: England
- Died: 1690; Nantucket, Massachusetts, English America
- Resting place: Founders Burial Ground, Nantucket; 41.286°N 70.133°W
- Occupations: Poet and interpreter
- Notable work: A Looking Glass for the Times
- Spouse: Mary Morrell Folger
- Parent(s): John Folger Jr. Meribah Gibbs
- Relatives: Benjamin Franklin (grandson); Ezra Cornell (great-grandson); J. A. Folger (descendant)

Peter Folger or Foulger (died 1690) was a poet and an interpreter of the American Indian language for the first settlers of Nantucket. He was instrumental in the colonization of Nantucket Island in the Massachusetts colony. He was the maternal grandfather of Benjamin Franklin.

== Life ==
Peter Folger was born in England, the son of John Folger Jr. and Meribah Gibbs. He left Norwich, Norfolk, England for America in 1635, settling initially in Watertown, Massachusetts, and later moving to Martha's Vineyard, where he worked as a teacher and surveyor. His father, John, a widower, came to the colonies in 1636 and ultimately settled in Martha's Vineyard.

In 1644, he married Mary Morrell, whom he met on the voyage from England. Morrell was an indentured servant and Folger bought her freedom from Hugh Peters for £20. They had nine children by 1669, the last of whom, Abiah Folger, married Josiah Franklin, and was the mother of Benjamin Franklin.

At the Vineyard, Folger supported himself by teaching school and surveying land. He was hired by Governor Thomas Mayhew and his son Thomas Mayhew Jr. to convert the Native American population to Christianity, during which time he learned to speak the native language. He was a Baptist in faith, and as such was told not to visit with the Puritans on the mainland. Rev. Experience Mayhew, in a letter to John Gardner, Esquire, dated 1694, states that when Thomas Mayhew Jr. left for England in 1657, he left the care of his church and mission to Peter Folger.

From time to time between 1659 and 1662, Folger journeyed to Nantucket in order to survey it for the proprietors. He was an interpreter for Tristram Coffin. In 1663 Folger moved to Nantucket full-time, having been granted a half a share of land by the proprietors, where he was a surveyor, an Indian interpreter, and clerk in the courts. He did, however, participate in an insurrection of the "half share men" against the larger land owners of the island, and was jailed for a period.

Folger died at Nantucket, Massachusetts, in 1690 and is buried in the Founders Burial Ground. His wife Mary Morrill Folger lived until 1704 and is also buried in the Founders Burial Ground.

== Works ==
- A Looking Glass for the Times, or the Former Spirit of New England Revived in this Generation (1675)
- A Denunciation of War

== Sources ==
- The New England Historical and Genealogical Register, Volume 16. By New England Historic Genealogical Society
- American Marriages Before 1699 [database on-line]. Provo, UT, US: Ancestry.com Operations Inc, 1997. Original data: Clemens, William Montgomery. American Marriage Records Before 1699. Pompton Lakes, NJ, US: Biblio Co., 1926.
