= Shakespeare's Head (Providence, Rhode Island) =

Historic building in Providence, Rhode Island

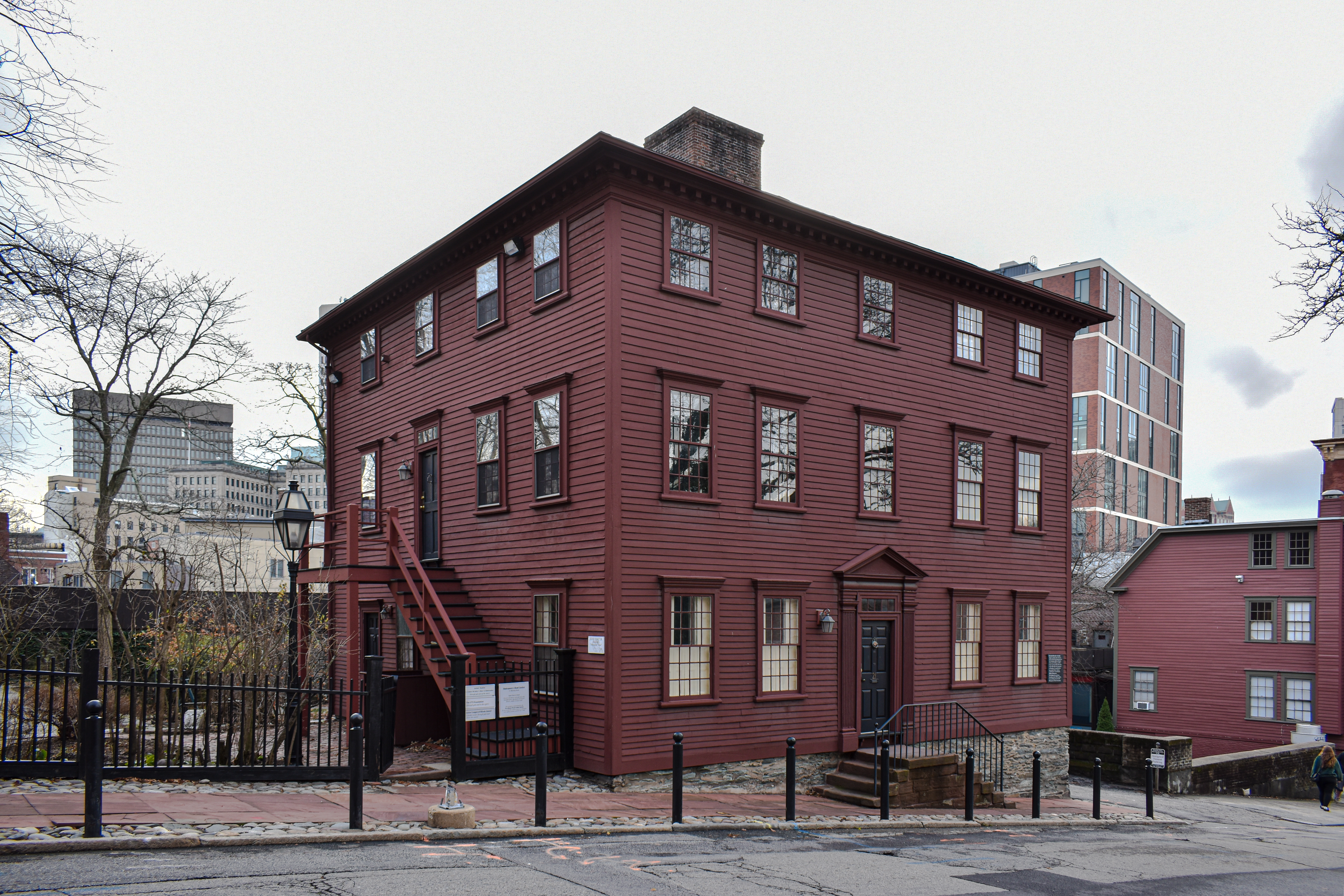
- 21 Meeting Street in 2020
- Alternative names: John Carter House; Primus House (since 2025)

General information
- Architectural style: Georgian
- Location: 21 Meeting Street, Providence, Rhode Island, USA
- Coordinates: 41.828562°N 71.408871°W
- Current tenants: Center for Reflective History
- Completed: 1772

Technical details
- Structural system: Timber frame on a fieldstone basement
- Floor count: 3 plus basement

Website
- Civis Foundation project page

Shakespeare's Head, also known as the John Carter House and, since 2025, Primus House, is a three-story timber-frame building at 21 Meeting Street in the College Hill Historic District of Providence, Rhode Island. Built in 1772 by printer John Carter, it served as his home, a bookstore, a post office, and the printing office of The Providence Gazette. The building takes its name from a sign depicting William Shakespeare that formerly stood outside the building.

Threatened with demolition in 1937, the building was acquired in 1938 by the newly formed Shakespeare's Head Association. The Providence Preservation Society (PPS), a longtime member of the association, became its owner in 2015. In 2025 PPS sold the building for use by the Center for Reflective History, a nonprofit supported by the Civis Foundation. Renamed Primus House, it will serve as the Center's headquarters.

== Building ==
=== Location ===
Shakespeare's Head stands on a sloping parcel on the south side of Meeting Street within the College Hill neighborhood, approximately 150 feet (46 m) east of North Main Street. The property lies within two overlapping historic designations: the College Hill Historic District, a local municipal district overseen by the Providence Historic District Commission, and the College Hill National Historic Landmark District, listed on the National Register of Historic Places.

=== Architecture ===
Front (Meeting Street) elevation, measured drawing, HABS, 1962

According to a 1962 Historic American Buildings Survey (HABS), Shakespeare's Head is a three-story Georgian-style timber-frame dwelling built around a large central brick chimney—an unusually tall structure for 1770s Providence, where two-story houses were typical. It includes a fieldstone basement, which originally housed the printing press. The building measures about 37 feet 3 inches (11.35 m) by 35 feet 3 inches (10.74 m), giving it a calculated footprint of 1,313 square feet (122.0 m^{2}) per floor.

The building has three entryways: a front door facing Meeting Street, and two entrances on the east side—one on the ground floor, historically used by visitors to the printing office, post office, and bookshop, and one reached by a stairway to the second floor. The paneled front door, topped with a small window, is framed by fluted Doric pilasters and a pediment, with double brownstone steps rising from the Meeting Street sidewalk. Windows are double-hung, with restored sash containing eight or twelve panes of glass.

Each floor contains a front stair hall and three principal rooms arranged around the chimney. The main staircase curves in a U-shape with a molded handrail, turned balusters, and newels. Interior finishes include wide board floors, plaster walls, some paneled wainscoting, and paneled doors.

The original grounds included a barn at the southwest corner of the lot, an adjacent cobblestone courtyard, and terraced garden beds extending up the eastern slope, later restored as an 18th-century style formal garden.

Measured floor plans, HABS, 1962

Basement

1st floor

2nd floor

3rd floor

=== Identity and naming ===
- John Carter House – Named for the printer John Carter, who built the house in 1772 and lived there until his death in 1814.
- Shakespeare's Head – Named for a carved sign of William Shakespeare that identified the press and bookshop, first used by William Goddard in 1763 and recreated by Carter at this building in 1772; it was reportedly lost in a storm in 1815.
- Primus House – This name was adopted in 2025 when the property was purchased for operation by the Center for Reflective History with the support of the Civis Foundation. It acknowledges Primus, an enslaved man who worked at the house.

== History ==
=== Narragansett homeland ===
The site of Shakespeare's Head lies within Moshassuck, part of the traditional homeland of the Narragansett people. It sits on the neck of land bounded by the Seekonk River to the east and by the Moshassuck River, the Great Salt Cove (now filled in), and the Providence River to the west.

In 1636, Roger Williams founded Providence on land acquired through negotiations with the Narragansett sachems Canonicus and Miantonomi. The town's original home lots were laid out as long, narrow parcels, each roughly 100 to 135 feet (30 to 41 m) wide and 4 to 6 acres (1.6 to 2.4 ha) in area, running east from the waterfront up the slope of present-day College Hill.

Before European settlement, the Narragansett and neighboring Indigenous nations traveled the area on a network of established trails, some of which later became early Providence property boundaries and roads. A National Park Service study identifies two such routes near Shakespeare's Head: the Pawtucket Trail (later Towne Street, King Street, now North Main Street) and the Wampanoag Trail (later Gaol or Jail Lane, now Meeting Street).

=== Coles and Pray land ownership (1638–1707) ===
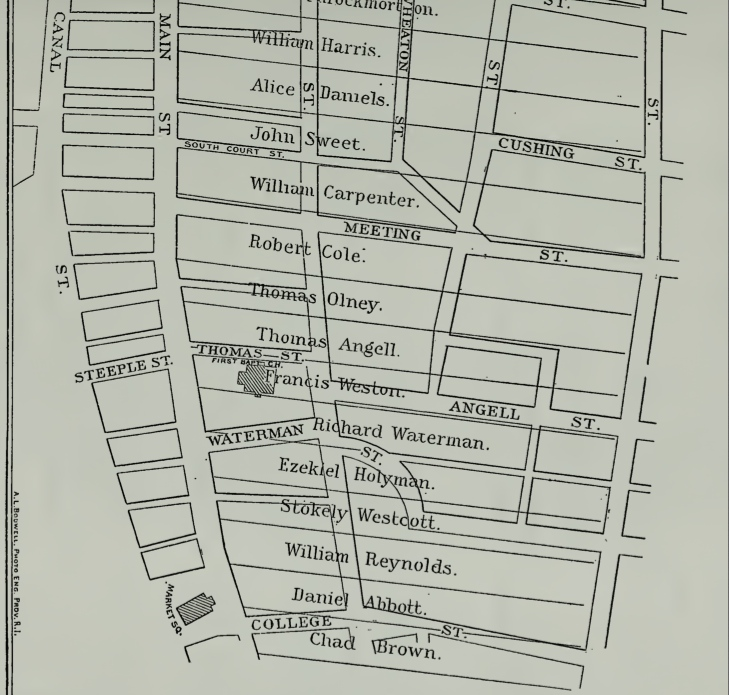
Providence home lots showing Robert Coles's lot

The site of Shakespeare’s Head occupies the western portion of one of Providence’s original home lots, laid out along what is now Meeting Street and extending eastward from Towne Street toward present‑day Hope Street. The parcel was granted to Robert Coles (c. 1598–1655), a founding proprietor, who with his wife Mary Hawxhurst (c. 1602–1656) built their first homestead on the lot. Coles later co‑authored the 1640 Providence Combination, a civil compact that superseded the town’s 1637 agreement and helped establish the community’s early governmental framework.

In 1653, Coles sold the home lot to tavern keeper Richard Pray (c. 1630 – 1693) and his wife, Mary Pray (c. 1630 – c. 1686). The deed described the property as lying "betwixt the house lot of Thomas Olney on the south and the highway whereon the Pound standeth [now Meeting Street] on the north." During King Philip's War, Mary Pray provided written military intelligence to colonial leaders and afterward—living separately from her husband—operated a licensed tavern on Towne Street that also hosted the town's meetings. (Note: According to Dorr, Mary Pray's tavern stood approximately at what is now the intersection of North Main and Steeple streets.)

In 1686, following Mary Pray's deathbed request, Richard Pray deeded the house and lot to their son, William Pray (c. 1655 – after 1705). Over the next two decades the lot was divided among three families. The western part, which included the future site of Shakespeare's Head, was acquired by merchant Gideon Crawford Sr. (1651–1707); (Note: No deed for this sale was recorded, but it is described in the 1716 division of Crawford's land between his sons, in which John Crawford (1693–1719) received "that part of the house lott which their father purchased of William Pray".) the middle section was acquired by merchant Gabriel Bernon; (Note: Two of Bernon's daughters married into another branch of the Crawford family—Susanna to Joseph Crawford and Mary to Gideon Crawford—so Crawford names appear in the middle section as well. The third daughter, Eve Bernon, sold her share, 190 feet (58 m) along the lane to John Crawford in 1767. These shares are separate from the western Crawford land on which Shakespeare's Head stands.) and the eastern section was sold to Thomas Olney Jr. (1632–1722), a longtime town clerk and pastor of the First Baptist Church.

=== Crawford land ownership (1707–1769) ===
The western portion of the old Coles and Pray lot passed from John Crawford Sr. (1693–1719) to his son, Captain John Crawford Jr. (1718–1746), a Providence mariner who was lost at sea on a voyage to the West Indies in December 1746. He left a pregnant widow, Abijah (Bowen) Crawford (1720–1774), and two young daughters, Anne (born 1742), who later married the merchant John Updike, and Amey (born 1744); a third daughter, Huldah, was born in 1747. Crawford's land on Gaol Lane was divided among the three. Anne's share lay at the western end, near Towne Street. Amey received a lot running 200 feet (61 m) along the south side of Gaol Lane west from the "back street," now Benefit Street. Huldah, who married Benjamin Stelle, received the land just east of Benefit Street, extending to the Bernon family's middle section.

=== Carter ownership (1769–1906) ===
Advertisement in the Providence Gazette (June 26, 1773), promoting Carter's business at Shakespeare's Head on Meeting Street.

In August 1767, the printer John Carter (1745–1814), who had trained under Benjamin Franklin in Philadelphia, came to Providence to assist Sarah Updike Goddard at the printing office of The Providence Gazette, which her son William Goddard had established in 1762 as Providence's first press. After Goddard retired to Philadelphia, Carter acquired the newspaper on November 12, 1768, along with its printing office on King Street.

Carter house (left) and Updike house (right), c. 1911

Through his friendship with John Updike, Carter met Amey Crawford, whom he married on May 14, 1769. On December 8, 1769, the Carters mortgaged Amey's lot to Updike for £111 1s 7d, reportedly to help finance a new house on the site. (Note: The deed took the usual colonial form of a mortgage: a conveyance to Updike that would "cease determine and be wholly void" once the debt was repaid.) In 1772 Carter built the three-story frame house at 21 Meeting Street to serve as his family residence, bookstore, post office, and printing office. The Gazette was first printed at the new address on December 5, 1772. Updike discharged the mortgage on February 28, 1774.

John and Amey Carter raised their children in the house; of twelve children recorded in Carter's family Bible, nine survived into adulthood. There were three enslaved individuals associated with the household: Ingow and her daughter Fanny, who performed domestic labor until Carter manumitted both in 1789, with Fanny remaining indentured until age 18; and Primus, who worked there in 1777 in an unspecified role.

In November 1793 Carter entered a partnership with William Wilkinson and moved the printing office and bookshop to the Abbott Still House on Market Square, at the foot of College Street, where the partners printed the Gazette. He retained the Meeting Street property as his family home. Carter and Wilkinson operated jointly until 1799, after which Carter continued as sole proprietor and editor until February 1814.

The Carters' youngest daughter, Elizabeth Ann Danforth (1790–1876), was the last of the family to live in the house. After the death of her husband, Walter R. Danforth, a former mayor of Providence, in 1861, she moved in with her brother Crawford Carter and lived there until her death in 1876. From the 1850s until the early 1920s the building also served as a boarding house for up to 25 tenants, mostly working-class laborers.

=== Railroad ownership (1906–1937) ===
In 1906, the Carter heirs sold the property to Stephen O. Metcalf, who later that year conveyed it to the New York, New Haven and Hartford Railroad Company during construction of the East Side Railroad Tunnel and viaduct. The railroad retained ownership for nearly two decades, and the building—left unmaintained—experienced significant structural deterioration.

In 1925, the railroad sold the property to James M. Stockard, who rented rooms in the building, including spaces used as artist studios. By the early 1930s, the building stood vacant, and in April 1937 it was condemned by Providence's building inspector and slated for demolition.

=== Shakespeare's Head Association (1937–2015) ===
After the building was condemned, local preservationists formed the Shakespeare's Head Association (SHA) to prevent its demolition. SHA acquired the property in January 1938 and undertook basic restoration and stabilization work.

Beginning in the 1940s, the building was used by a range of civic organizations, including youth groups and professional associations. By the early 1980s, SHA faced financial challenges, and in 1985 the association restructured ownership with the Providence Preservation Society (PPS) and the Junior League of Rhode Island.

=== Preservation Society ownership and sale (2015–present) ===
PPS became the sole member of SHA in 2013 after the Junior League withdrew. SHA formally dissolved and PPS assumed full ownership of the property in 2015.

In 2025, the property was sold by PPS for operation by the Center for Reflective History, a nonprofit established that year with support from the Civis Foundation to research and interpret the building's social history. (Note: The deed conveying the property in May 2025 names the buyer as Meeting 21 Realty LLC, a Rhode Island limited liability company organized the day before closing. Press accounts describe the purchaser variously as the Civis Foundation, which funded the purchase, and as the Center for Reflective History, which will occupy and operate the building.)

== Sources ==
- Austin, John Osborne (1887). The Genealogical Dictionary of Rhode Island: Comprising Three Generations of Settlers Who Came Before 1690. Albany, N.Y.: J. Munsell's Sons.
- Auwaerter, John E.; Cowperthwaite, Karen (2010). Cultural Landscape Report for Roger Williams National Memorial (PDF) (Report). Boston, Mass.: National Park Service, Olmsted Center for Landscape Preservation.
- Bartlett, John Russell, ed. (1856). Records of the Colony of Rhode Island and Providence Plantations in New England (PDF). Vol. 1. Providence: A. Crawford Greene and Brother.
- Bicknell, Thomas Williams (1920). The History of the State of Rhode Island and Providence Plantations. Vol. 4. New York: The American Historical Society.
- Cady, John Hutchins (1949). The Story of Shakespeare's Head (PDF) (Report). Rhode Island Historical Society.
- Cady, John Hutchins (1957). The Civic and Architectural Development of Providence, 1636–1950. Providence: The Book Shop.
- Carpenter, Daniel Hoogland (1901). History and Genealogy of the Carpenter Family in America, from the Settlement at Providence, R.I., 1637–1901 (PDF). Jamaica, N.Y.: The Marion Press.
- Cowperthwaite, Wheeler (June 28, 2025). "POETIC JUSTICE - Shakespeare's Head building to get new life focusing on ties to slavery". The Providence Journal. p. A1.
- Providence Record Commissioners (1892–1915). The Early Records of the Town of Providence. Vol. I–XXI. Providence: Snow & Farnham.
- Dorr, Henry C. (1882). The Planting and Growth of Providence: Illustrated in the Gradual Accumulation of the Materials for Domestic Comfort, the Means of Internal Communication, and the Development of Local Industries. Rhode Island Historical Tracts. Vol. 15. Providence, R.I.: Sidney S. Rider. OCLC 1050816903 – via Internet Archive.
- Eberle, Edward J. (2004). "Another of Roger Williams's Gifts: Women's Right to Liberty of Conscience: Joshua Verin v. Providence Plantations". Roger Williams University Law Review. 9 (2): 399–424.
- Gavin, Christopher (June 17, 2025). "Details of a 250-year-old R.I. home's ties to slavery were uncovered last year. Now its future lies in its past". The Boston Globe.
- Greene, Welcome Arnold (1886). The Providence Plantations for Two Hundred and Fifty Years. J. A. & R. A. Reid.
- Greene, Welcome A. (1890). "The History of a Ferry". Narragansett Historical Register. 8 (3): 274–301.
- Harris, Marilyn (March 3, 2022). "Sarah Updike Goddard: Colonial Woman of the Press". Cocumscussoc Review. Smith's Castle.
- Historic American Buildings Survey (1962). John Carter House, "Shakespeare's Head" (PDF) (HABS Data Pages). Washington, D.C.: National Park Service. HABS RI-1.
- Hopkins, Charles Wyman (1886). The Home Lots of the Early Settlers of the Providence Plantations. Providence, R.I.
- Kimball, Gertrude Selwyn (1912). Providence in Colonial Times. Boston: Houghton Mifflin.
- Massachusetts Historical Society (1871). Collections of the Massachusetts Historical Society. 5th Series. Vol. 1. Boston: Massachusetts Historical Society.
- McCorison, Marcus A. (October 1971). "The Wages of John Carter's Journeyman Printers, 1771–1779". Proceedings of the American Antiquarian Society. 81 (2): 273–303.
- National Society of Daughters of Founders and Patriots of America (1919). Lineage Book of the National Society of Daughters of Founders and Patriots of America. Vol. 7. Washington, D.C.: National Society of Daughters of Founders and Patriots of America.
- Perry, Amos (1897). "Providence Gazette: Its Publication, Publishers, Publication Offices, and Editors". Publications of the Rhode Island Historical Society. 5 (3). Providence, RI: Rhode Island Historical Society: 196–200.
- City of Providence (1895). Financial Report of the City of Providence, Rhode Island. Vol. 48. Providence, R.I.: City Auditor's Office.
- City of Providence. Land Evidence Records (Record of Deeds). Providence, R.I.: City of Providence Archives.
- "Quit Claim Deed: Providence Preservation Society to Meeting 21 Realty LLC". Land Evidence Records. City of Providence Office of the Recorder of Deeds. May 29, 2025. Doc. No. 2025391951, Book 14428, p. 274.
- "Providence Preservation Society Announces Sale of Historic Shakespeare's Head Property to the Center for Reflective History" (Press release). Providence Preservation Society. May 29, 2025.
- Providence Preservation Society (1962). Mary A. Gowdey Industrial and Architectural Survey: 21 Meeting Street, "Shakespeare's Head" (PDF) (Property Research File). Providence, RI: Providence Preservation Society.
- Providence Preservation Society (June 5, 2025). "An Incomplete Timeline of Shakespeare's Head". ppsri.org.
- "Signs Old and New: Age of Picture, Age of Gilt, Now an Age of Something Else". The Providence Sunday Journal. October 29, 1893. p. 10.
- Providence Typographical Union No. 33 (1907). Printers and Printing in Providence, 1762–1907. Providence, R.I.: Providence Printing Company.
- Root, James Pierce (1890). Steere Genealogy: A Record of the Descendants of John Steere, who Settled in Providence, Rhode Island, about the Year 1660, with Some Account of the Steeres of England. Cambridge, Mass.: Printed at the Riverside Press.
- Sanderson, Edward F.; Morgan, Keith N. (January 26, 1976). College Hill Historic District (National Register of Historic Places Inventory–Nomination Form). Rhode Island Historical Preservation Commission. NRHP reference no. 70000019.
- Stachiw, Myron; Gibson, Susan G.; Cole, Stephen; Thorbahn, Peter; Wood, Cynthia (1979). Archeological Resource Study: Roger Williams National Memorial, Rhode Island (Cultural Resources Management Study No. 1). Boston, MA: Division of Cultural Resources, North Atlantic Regional Office, National Park Service.
- Wheeler, Jacob (October 11, 2024). "Shakespeare's Head building for sale after research into slave history". The Providence Journal.
- Woods, John Carter Brown (1918). John Carter of Providence, Rhode Island: July 21, 1745–August 19, 1814, and His Descendants. Providence: Rhode Island Historical Society.
- Wroth, Lawrence C. (October 1941). "The First Press in Providence: A Study in Social Development" (PDF). Proceedings of the American Antiquarian Society. 51 (2): 351–383.
