= List of early American publishers and printers =

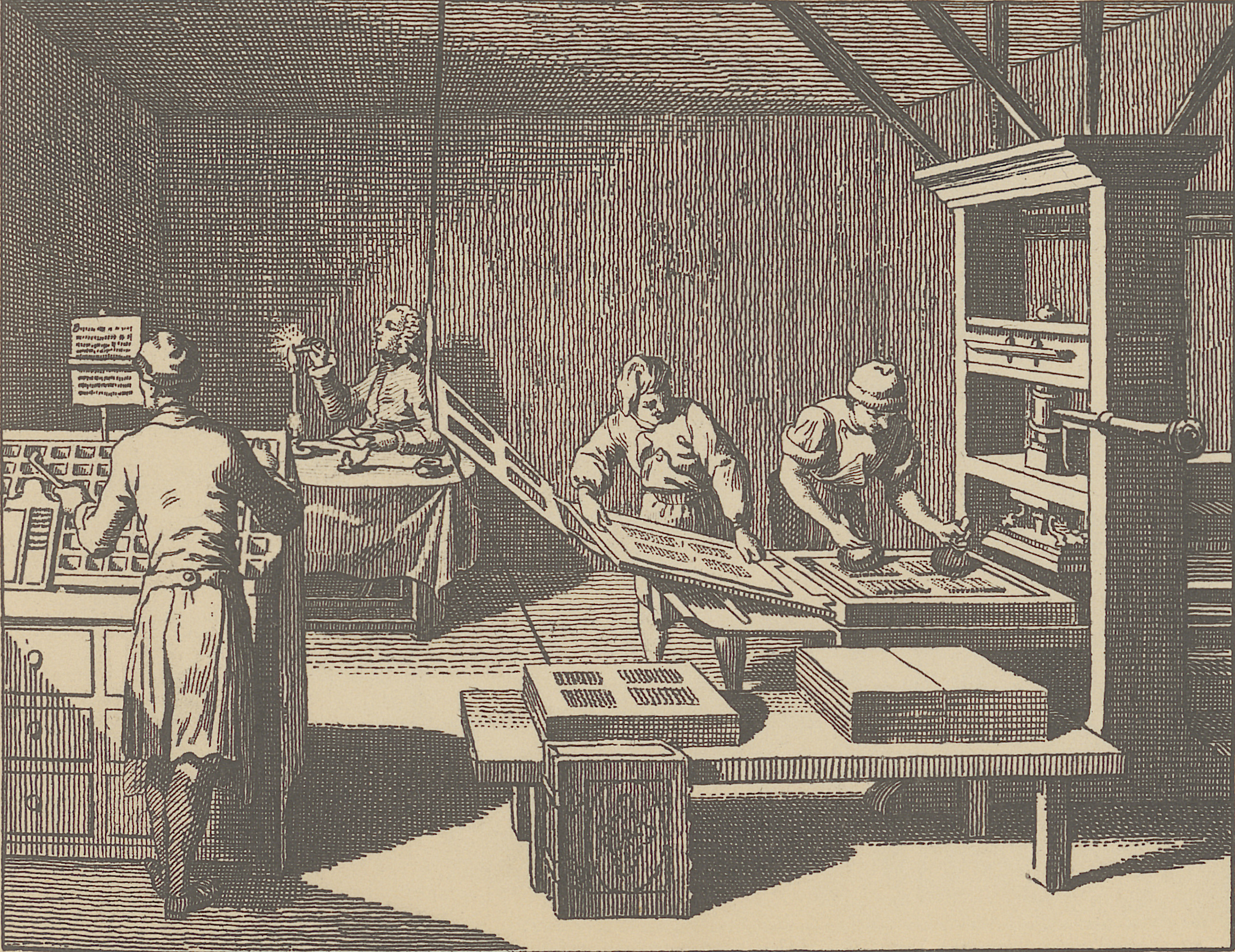
A typical printing press of the 18th century

List of early American publishers and printers is a stand alone list of Wikipedia articles about publishers and printers in colonial and early America, intended as a quick reference, with basic descriptions taken from the ledes of the respective articles.

- Jane Aitken 1764–1832
  Printer, publisher, bookbinder, and bookseller in Philadelphia; Sister of Robert Aitken, who continued his business when he died. Printed and bound dozens of books for the Athenaeum of Philadelphia and about 400 volumes for the American Philosophical Society

- Robert Aitken (publisher) 1734–1802
  Philadelphia printer and the first to publish an English language Bible in the U.S.

- Benjamin Franklin Bache 1769–1798
  Journalist, printer and publisher. Founded the Philadelphia Aurora, a newspaper that supported Jeffersonian philosophy, known for its attacks on Federalist leaders, including George Washington. Known for polarizing the press, prompting the Alien and Sedition Acts

- Francis Bailey (publisher) 1744—1817
  Revolutionary War printer, publisher and journalist in Pennsylvania from 1771 to 1807. First printer to publicly refer to George Washington as the "Father of his country"; First to print the Articles of Confederation.

- Andrew Barclay (bookbinder) 1737-1823
  Bookbinder in Boston and New York during the American Revolution; Loyalist

- Robert Bell (publisher) 1725-1784
  Printing Thomas Paine's celebrated work, Common Sense

- Andrew Bradford 1686–1742
  Printer in colonial Philadelphia. He published the first newspaper in Philadelphia, The American Weekly Mercury,

- William Bradford (printer, born 1663) 1660–1752
  English printer and publisher in colonial British America, known as founder of the press in the middle colonies

- William Bradford (printer, born 1719) 1719–1791
  Publisher of The Pennsylvania Journal, Grandson of the printer William Bradford

- John Campbell (editor) — 1653–1728
  Newspaper editor in Boston; founded the first regularly published newspaper in the British colonies in America, The Boston News-Letter

- Mathew Carey 1760–1839
  Irish-born American publisher and economist from Philadelphia, founder of The Pennsylvania Herald, with the help of Benjamin Franklin and Lafayette

- Francis Childs (printer) 1763–1830
  publisher and printer of The New York Daily Advertiser; printer for the newly established United States government in 1783

- John Carter (printer) 1745-1814
  Printer and publisher; Published The Providence Gazette with William Goddard in Rhode Island; Apprentice of Benjamin Franklin

- Isaac Collins (printer) 1746–1817
  Printer, publisher; published New Jersey Gazette and New Jersey Almanac; Noted for his famous 1791 bible; politically active during American Revolution; printed continental currency

- John Day (printer) 1522–1584
  English Protestant printer; Specialized in printing and distributing Protestant literature

- James Davis (printer) 1721–1785
  First printer and postmaster of North Carolina. Founder and printer of the North-Carolina Gazette

- Stephen Daye 1594–1668
  Indentured immigrant from England to British colony of Massachusetts; Printed for Elizabeth Glover's press, the first in the British colonies

- Gregory Dexter — (1610–1700)
  Printer, Baptist minister, early President of the combined towns of Providence and Warwick in the Colony of Rhode Island.

- Thomas Dobson (printer) 1751–1823
  Master printer; Famous for publishing the earliest American version of the Encyclopedia Britannica; First in the U.S. to publish a complete Hebrew Bible

- John Dunlap 1747–1812
  Irish printer, printed the first copies of the United States Declaration of Independence

- Benjamin Edes 1732–1803
  Journalist newspaper publisher and advocate of the American Revolution. Publisher of the Boston Gazette along with John Gill. Also published The Boston Gazette and Country Journal

- John Fenno 1751–1798
  Federalist Party editor; Founder of Gazette of the United States which played a major role in shaping party politics in the United States in the 1790s.

- Thomas Fleet (printer) (1685-1758)
  Booksellers, printer; established the Boston Evening Post

- Peter Fleet
  Woodcut artist and typesetter in 18th-century Boston, enslaved by Thomas Fleet (printer)

- John Foster (printer) 1648–1681
  Printmaker; credited with producing the first woodcut image and the first woodcut map in British colonial America and the official seals of the Massachusetts Bay Colony

- Daniel Fowle (printer) 1715–1787
  Arrested in Massachusetts for seditious printing; Founder of the New Hampshire Gazette

- Benjamin Franklin 1705–1790
  World famous American founding father, postmaster, printer, inventor and scientist

- James Franklin (printer) 1697–1735
  Colonial author, printer, newspaper publisher, and almanac publisher. Published the New England Courant, one of the oldest independent American newspapers; Older brother of Benjamin Franklin

- Hugh Gaine 1726–1807
  Irish printer, bookseller, and newspaper publisher; Publisher of The New York Mercury

- John Gill (printer) 1732-1785
  Printer in Boston, Massachusetts; Gill issued The Boston Gazette newspaper with Benjamin Edes; He later published The Continental Journal

- Elizabeth Glover 1602-1643
  Proprietor of the first printing press in the British colonies and publisher of the first book in the British colonies

- Sarah Updike Goddard 1701–1770
  printer, co-founder publisher of The Providence Gazette; Mother of William Goddard and Mary Katherine Goddard, also noted colonial printers

- Daniel Henchman (publisher) 1689-1761
  Boston's largest book seller and publisher before the American revolution. Built the first papermill in New England. Published the first Bible printed in the English language to appear in the American colonies.

- Mary Katherine Goddard 1738–1816
  Publisher and postmaster of Baltimore Post Office; Older sister of William Goddard

- William Goddard (publisher) 1740–1817
  Patriot, publisher, printer and postal inspector; Worked closely with Benjamin Franklin in establishing colonial postal system

- Bartholomew Green Sr. (printer) 1666–1732
  Printer and later the publisher of The Boston News-Letter

- Samuel Green (printer) 1614–1702
  American printer, progenitor of the Green family of printers; one of the first American printers in Cambridge

- Jonas Green early 1700s–1767
  Newspaper publisher together with wife Anne Catherine Hoof Green in Colonial Maryland; Strong opponent of The Stamp Act

- David Hall (printer) 1714–1772
  Printer, business partner of Benjamin Franklin in Philadelphia. Eventually took over Franklin's printing business in Pennsylvania and The Pennsylvania Gazette

- Samuel Hall (printer) 1740-1807
  Editor and founder of The Essex Gazette, the first newspaper to appear in Salem Massachusetts in 1768.

- Benjamin Harris (publisher) 1673-1716
  English publisher, involved in the Popish Plot in England; Moved to New England as an early journalist; Published the New England Primer, the first textbook in British America, and edited the first multi-page newspaper there, Publick Occurrences Both Forreign and Domestick

- Nicholas Hasselbach (printer) — (1749-1769)
  Printer and paper mill owner who lived in Philadelphia and then Baltimore. First printer to set up a printing press in Baltimore.

- Anthony Haswell (printer) 1756–1816
  English immigrant to New England; Newspaper, almanac, and book publisher; Postmaster General of Vermont; Jeffersonian printer imprisoned under the Sedition Act of 1798

- John Holt (publisher) 1721–1784
  Newspaper publisher, printer, postmaster, mayor of Williamsburg, Virginia; Helped publish the Connecticut Gazette, The New York Gazette, and The New-York Journal; Worked with Benjamin Franklin, Samuel Adams and The Sons of Liberty; Published articles against the Stamp Act of 1765

- James Humphreys (printer) 1748–1810
  Printer, publisher, politician in Nova Scotia and Pennsylvania; Printing apprentice of William Bradford

- William Hunter (publisher) early 1700s–1761
  Newspaper publisher, book publisher, and official government printer for the colony of Virginia

- Samuel Keimer 1689–1742
  English printer and emigrant; Original founder of The Pennsylvania Gazette who sold it to Benjamin Franklin in 1729

- Samuel Kneeland (printer) 1696-1769
  Printer and publisher of The Boston Gazette

- Samuel Loudon (1727-1813) Founder and printer of The New-York Packet and The American Advertiser; Postmaster in Fishkill, New York, during the American Revolutionary War

- Hugh Meredith 1697–1749
  Farmer and printer; Briefly had a partnership with Benjamin Franklin as publishers of The Pennsylvania Gazette

- John Henry Miller 1702-1782
  Was employed by Benjamin Franklin and William Bradford to superintend their German printing as a translator of German into English.; Published the Gazette of Lancaster, Pennsylvania, in 1752, and from 1762 to 1779 Der Wöchentliche Philadelphische Staatsbote

- James Parker (publisher) 1714–1770
  Printer, publisher, apprentice of Benjamin Franklin who later appointed him Postmaster of the colonies; Set up first print shop in New Jersey; Was a printer for Yale College, and general manager of the first public library in New York City

- William Parks (publisher) 1699–1750
  Printer, journalist in England and Colonial America; First printer in Maryland officially authorized printer for the colonial government; Published first newspaper in Southern American colonies, The Maryland Gazette

- Richard Pierce (publisher) ?-1691
  Publisher who printed Publick Occurrences Both Forreign and Domestick for Benjamin Harris, generally considered the first newspaper printed in America

- Alexander Purdie (publisher) 1743–1779
  Printer, publisher, in colonial Williamsburg, Virginia; Printed the laws and legislative journals for the colonial government of Virginia

- Clementina Rind 1740–1774
  First female newspaper printer and publisher in Virginia, who took over The Virginia Gazette, founded by husband, William, upon his death; Published Thomas Jefferson's tract A Summary View of the Rights of British America

- James Rivington 1724–1802
  Published a Loyalist newspaper called Rivington's Gazette

- Joseph Royle (publisher) 1732–1766
  Newspaper publisher and printer for the colony of Virginia; Apprentice of William Hunter

- Benjamin Russell (journalist) 1761–1845
  Established the Columbian Centinel and was one of the founding members of the American Antiquarian Society

- Solomon Southwick (1773–1839)
  Printer and publisher, publisher of Newport Mercury; principal organizer of the Anti-Masonic Party.

- Christopher Sower (elder) 1693–1758
  First German-language printer and publisher in North America;

- Christopher Sower (younger) 1721–1784
  clergyman and printer; Son of Christopher Sower, elder

- Christopher Sower III 1754–1799
  Printer and publisher in Pennsylvania; Loyalist during the American Revolution; Son of Christopher Sower (younger)

- William Strahan (publisher) 1715–1785
  Printer, publisher, and politician who sat in the House of Commons between from 1774 to 1784; Friend of Benjamin Franklin

- Isaiah Thomas (publisher) 1749–1831
  Newspaper publisher and author. Performed first public reading of the Declaration of Independence in Worcester, Massachusetts; Reported first account of the Battles of Lexington and Concord; Founder of the American Antiquarian Society

- Louis Timothee 1699–1738
  Printer colonial Pennsylvania and South Carolina; Worked for Benjamin Franklin, publishing newspapers, including The Pennsylvania Gazette, The South Carolina Gazette; Served as a part-time librarian in 1732 for the Library Company of Philadelphia

- Ann Timothy 1727–1792
  Newspaper publisher from South Carolina; Became the official printer for the state of South Carolina

- Elizabeth Timothy 1700–1757
  Printer, newspaper publisher in colony of South Carolina who worked for Benjamin Franklin; First female in America to become a newspaper publisher

- Peter Timothy 1724–1782
  Printer and politician. Immigrated to the American colonies with his parents and worked for Benjamin Franklin

- Benjamin Towne mid 1700s–1793
  Published The Pennsylvania Evening Post; published the first daily newspaper in the U.S.; First to publish the United States Declaration of Independence in a newspaper

- William Williams (printer and publisher) (1787-1850
  Printer and publisher of several newspapers in Utica, New York. An elder of the first Presbyterian Church in Utica.

- John Peter Zenger 1697–1746
  Famous for the 1733 landmark case where he was accused of printing libelous material about William Cosby, the colonial governor in New York; Andrew Hamilton and William Smith, Sr. successfully defended him in New York, maintaining that telling the truth was a legitimate defense in libel cases.
