= The Constitutional Courant =

Colonial American newspaper

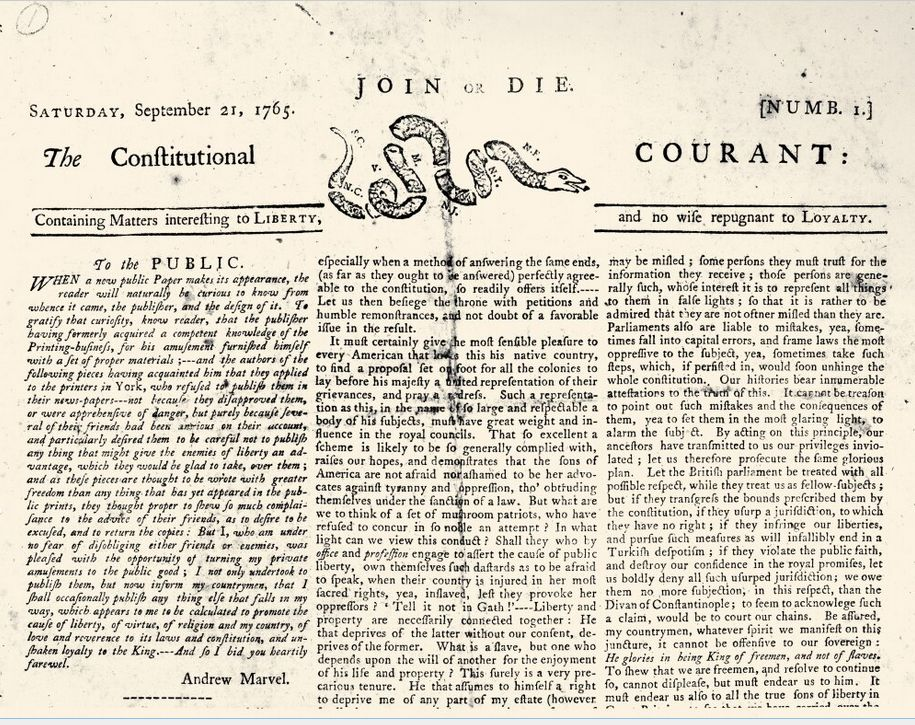
The Constitutional Courant September 21, 1765

The Constitutional Courant was a single issue colonial American-newspaper published in response to the Stamp Act 1765. It was printed by William Goddard under an assumed name of Andrew Marvel. The newspaper vociferously attacked the Stamp Act in strong language, which caught the attention of colonial printers and royal colonial officials alike. The Courant and its general message proved popular and the newspaper was soon reprinted in other major towns and distributed elsewhere among the colonies.

The Courant, which had a publication date of September 21, 1765, prominently reprinted Benjamin Franklin's 1754 Join or Die editorial cartoon.

== History ==
In 1765 the British Parliament passed the Stamp Act to help pay the debts it incurred during the Seven Years' War, which imposed a tax on an assortment of paper documents, including newspapers, contracts, deeds, wills and other such legal documents. The new tax was widely received with strong disapproval, especially by printers and newspaper publishers, many of whom suspended printing of their newspapers in protest.

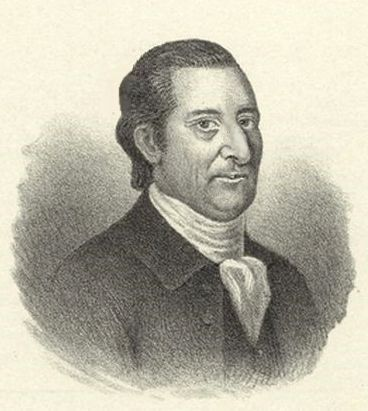
William Goddard

In response to the Stamp Act the Courant was privately printed by William Goddard in Woodbridge, New Jersey on the press of James Parker, a printer with whom Goddard once served as an apprentice under. Goddard had previously approached John Holt as a prospective printer, but Holt declined Goddard's request. The Courant caught the notice of both patriots and the British colonial government. (Note: Goddard would later go on to establish The Pennsylvania Chronicle and Universal Advertiser.)

The heading of The Constitutional Courant was inscribed with an imprint which read, "Printed by Andrew Marvel, at the Sign of the Bribe refused, on Constitution-Hill, North America." In the center of the title was the now famous image of a snake, cut into parts, which represented the dis-unified colonies, with the motto, "Join or die". Below the title heading, was an address to the public from the fictitious printer and publisher, Andrew Marvel. The first printing of this paper was published without a date, but was printed on Saturday, September 21, 1765, some two months before the Stamp Act was to take effect. For its motto, the words "Containing matters interesting to Liberty, and nowise repugnant to Loyalty." were imprinted just below its heading. The Courant presented an assortment of articles of a highly inflammatory nature deriding the new tax, which aptly reflected the growing resentment among the colonists.

The Constitutional Courant was the first newspaper to appear in New Jersey. While the Courant circulated in other colonies due to its popular sentiments, its demand proved so great that it was also reprinted in Boston and Philadelphia, joining other newspapers which were already vehemently criticizing the Stamp Act. Sales of the Courant saw unusually high numbers. The newspaper was secretly sent to New York and hawked on the streets by newsboys hired for that purpose, while it was also distributed along all the post-roads by colonial riders. In New York, however, which was a largely loyalist town, the articles in the Courant strongly criticizing the Stamp Act were considered too extreme by most newspapers and subsequently the newspaper saw little distribution there.

The appearance of the Courant in New York was taken notice by the colonial government there and was the cause of much excitement. A council was called, and held at the fort in that city, but the identity of the author and printer could not be determined, and no action could be taken. One of the council members demanded of one of the hawkers, named Lawrence Sweeney, "where that incendiary paper was printed?" Sweeney was already prepared for such an encounter and was instructed to answer " At Peter Hassenclever's iron-works, please your honor." Peter Hassenclever was a wealthy German, well renown as the owner of huge iron works in New Jersey. Later other publications of a like kind frequently appeared with an imprint that read, "Printed at Peter Hassenclever's iron-works." Only one issue of The Constitutional Courant was published, as continued publication of the Courant, however, was never intended. (Note: Afterward, other publications of this issue often appeared with the inscription — " Printed at Peter Hassenclever's iron works.")

== See also ==
- Early American publishers and printers
- List of early American publishers and printers
- History of American newspapers
- Newspapers of colonial America
- List of newspapers in New Jersey

== Bibliography ==
- Ashley, Perry J. (1985). American newspaper journalists, 1690-1872. Detroit, MI : Gale Research Company. ISBN 978-0-8103-17215.
- Buckingham, Joseph Tinker (1850). Specimens of newspaper literature : with personal memoirs, anecdotes, and reminiscences. Vol. II. Boston : Charles C. Little and James Brown.
- Dyer, Alan (1982). A biography of James Parker, colonial printer. Troy, N.Y. : Whitston Pubublishing Company. ISBN 9780878752027.
- Hudson, Frederic (1873). Journalism in the United States, from 1690 to 1872. New York, Harper & Brothers.
- Lee, James Melvin (1923). History of American journalism. Boston, New York, Houghton Mifflin Company. ( Alternative publication )
- Morgan, Edmund S.; Morgan, Helen M. (1963). 'The Stamp Act Crisis: Prologue to Revolution. Chapel Hill, Published for the Institute of Early American History and Culture at Williamsburg, Va. by the University of North Carolina Press.
- Schlesinger, Arthur M. (March 1935). "The Colonial Newspapers and the Stamp Act". The New England Quarterly. 8 (1). The New England Quarterly, Inc.: 63–83. doi:10.2307/359430. JSTOR 359430.
- Thomas, Isaiah (1874). The history of printing in America, with a biography of printers. Vol. II. New York, B. Franklin.
