= John Carter (printer) =

American printer and publisher (1745–1814)

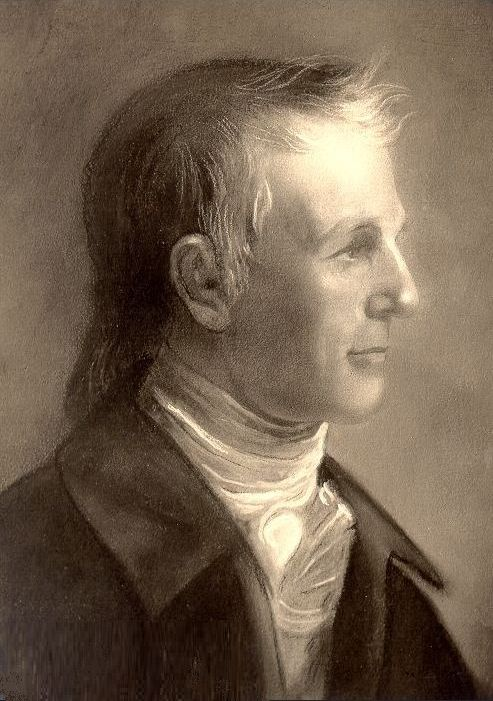
- Painting of Carter, by Samuel Brown c. 1800
- Born: July 21, 1745; Philadelphia, Pennsylvania Colony, British America
- Died: August 19, 1814 (aged 69); Providence, Rhode Island, US
- Occupations: Printer; publisher; postmaster
- Spouse: Almey Crawford (m. 1769)
- Children: 4
- Relatives: John Carter Brown (grandson)

John Carter (July 21, 1745 – August 19, 1814) was an early American printer, newspaper publisher, and postmaster of Providence, Rhode Island. Carter entered the printing profession as an apprentice of Benjamin Franklin while living in Philadelphia. After he entered into a partnership and ran The Providence Gazette, which he eventually purchased and ran on his own up until the year of his death.

During the Gaspee Affair Carter played an active role in reporting the subsequent arrests and other developments in his newspaper, for which he himself was arrested, for libel. During his career as a vigilant printer Carter became one of the leading publishers and printers in the country.

== Family and early life ==
John Carter was born to a prominent family in Philadelphia. He moved to Providence and after a few years there he married Amey Crawford, the second daughter of Captain John and Abijah (Bowen) Crawford on May 14, 1769.

John Carter was the youngest of a line of men sharing the same name. John Carter's father was named John Carter, and John Carter (the youngest)'s grandfather too was named John Carter. John Carter the elder was an early settler in Norfolk, Virginia. His son, born in 1713, married Elizabeth Spriggs on July 3 1734 in Christ Church, Philadelphia.

Written in Carter's family Bible in his hand writing, Carter entered the following account:

John Carter and Amey Crawford, (2nd Daughter of Capt. John Crawford of Providence) were married on Sunday morning, May 14, 1769, at 8 o'clock, by the Reverend, learned and pious John Graves, Missionary from the Society in England for propagating the Gospel.

Their marriage produced three daughters and a son: Ann, Rebecca, Elizabeth and Benjamin B. Carter (1771–1835). Ann married Nicholas Brown Jr., Rebecca married Amos Throop Jenckes and, Elizabeth Ann, married Walter Raleigh Danforth. Benjamin spent the greater part of his life in the shipping business. He graduated from Brown University (1789) and the Pennsylvania Medical College and practiced medicine for a short while.

The John Carter Brown Library is named after Carter's grandson, John Carter Brown, the son of his daughter, Ann Carter, who married Nicholas Brown. In 1918 Carter's great, great grandson, John Carter Brown Woods, wrote and published a short biography about Carter's family and career.

== Career ==
Carter began his career as a printing apprentice of Benjamin Franklin, of Franklin & Hall in Philadelphia. In September 1767, shortly after completing his apprenticeship with Franklin, he went to Providence, Rhode Island, and became a journeyman in the printing office of William Goddard, who commenced business in Providence in 1762. Goddard started The Providence Gazette but in little time became discouraged and gave up his business in Providence and removed to New York, leaving the management of his newspaper to his mother, Sarah Updike Goddard, a lady with a great aptitude for the business. For two years she managed the Gazette with great efficiency, while Carter kept the operation supplied and running smoothly, subsequently becoming a business partner with Mrs. Goddard on September 19. On November 12, 1768, she sold the paper to Carter, then age 23, who became sole proprietor of the paper and kept it in operation until February 19, 1814. In the various issues of The Providence Gazette Carter expressed his patriotic sentiments and advocated the cause of his country, through the entire era of the American Revolution.

In 1772 in Providence Carter operated the Post Office from his print shop at a home he built, now known as Shakespeare's Head, at 21 Meeting Street. Carter was also a partner in Carter and Wilkinson the only publishing house in Rhode Island at the time. That year Carter was appointed by Benjamin Franklin as the second postmaster of Providence, Rhode Island. He held that position until 1792.

In 1774, Carter had an apprentice Daniel Bowen.

G. Thomas Tanselle, in his essay, "Some Statistics of American Printing 1764–1783", places Carter near the top of a list outlining printing production in the colonies, placing Carter at seventh in printing production for the country, and producing a fifth, (43%) of Rhode Island's printing output.

Carter was a member of the Committee of Correspondence during the American Revolution and is said to have discharged the duties of his position with distinction.

=== Gaspee Affair ===
Carter played an active role in the Gaspee Affair through his newspaper, The Providence Gazette, reporting the legal proceedings and other events during its aftermath. In 1772, HMS Gaspee, a schooner commanded by William Dudingston, in Narragansett Bay, was stationed there enforcing the Navigation Acts, involving what was regarded by the British Crown as illicit trading when it ran aground in shallow water while pursuing the packet ship Hannah. The British became increasingly aggressive in their searches, boardings, and seizures, and even went so far as to stopping merchants on shore and searching through their wares. Angered by what was regarded as yet another British intrusion, a group of Rhode Islanders boarded the ship at midnight on June 9, 1772, and set it ablaze. The incident was soon scantly reported by newspapers, however, Carter in The Providence Gazette on June 13 published accounts that condemned the scheme of transporting suspects 3009 miles back to England. Another article of December 19, 1772 stated: "The idea of seizing a number of persons, under the points of bayonets, and transporting them three thousand miles for trial ... is shocking to humanity, repugnant to every dictate of reason, liberty, and justice." The commission of inquiry continued in its efforts during the first half of 1773, while the newspapers kept a vigilant watch on its developments. After John Cole, a member of the Assembly's committee of correspondence, unwillingly testified at the tribunal The Providence Gazette castigated him for betraying "the faith and confidence reposed in him by his country." Outraged at the public accusation Cole resorted to legal action, and, like many colonial printers before him, Carter was arrested for libel. The grand jury at the Inferior Court of Common Pleas of Providence County, however, refused to indict Carter. Carter, in his defense exclaimed "This very extraordinary attempt to destroy the liberty of the press did not fail to alarm the friends of freedom ..."

== Final days ==
After the war Carter and William Wilkinson, of Thompson, Connecticut, opened the first bookstore in Providence, in a building at the comer of Market Square and Canal Street which after Carter's death, Wilkinson retained until 1817, carrying on the business as a book binder, bookseller and printer. Carter died in Providence, August 19, 1814, at the age of 69.

== See also ==
- Early American publishers and printers
- List of early American publishers and printers
- Bibliography of early American publishers and printers

== Bibliography ==
- The Biographical cyclopedia of representative men of Rhode Island. National biographical publishing co. 1881.
- Bartlett, John Russell (1861). A history of the destruction of His Britannic Majesty's schooner Gaspee in Narragansett Bay, on the 10th June, 1772. Providence, A. C. Greene, printer to the state. (Online version)
- Bicknell, Thomas Williams (1920). The history of the state of Rhode Island and Providence Plantations. Vol. II. New York, The American Historical Society.
- Bailyn, Bernard; Hench, John B., eds. (1981) [1980]. The Press & the American Revolution. Boston: Northeastern University Press (Originally published: Worcester, Mass.: American Antiquarian Society). ISBN 978-0-9303-50307. (Google book)
- Carroll, William; Meegan, William J.; Palmer, William.; Horton, John J.; Sullivan, George B. (1907). Printers and printing in Providence, 1762–1907. Providence, R.I.Providence Printing Co.
- Schlesinger, Arthur M. (1958). Prelude To Independence The Newspaper War On Britain 1764 1776. Alfred A.Knopf.
- Thomas, Isaiah (1874). The history of printing in America, with a biography of printers. Vol. I. New York, B. Franklin.
- "Carter-Danforth Papers". Rhode Island Historical Society. 1999 [1991].
- Woods, John Carter Brown (1918). John Carter of Providence Rhode Island. Rhode Island Historical Society.
- Wroth, Lawrence C. (1938). The Colonial Printer. Portland, Me., The Southworth-Anthoensen press.
- "John Carter, Printer and Postmaster, Providence, RI".
