= William Goddard (publisher) =

American patriot and printer (1740–1817)

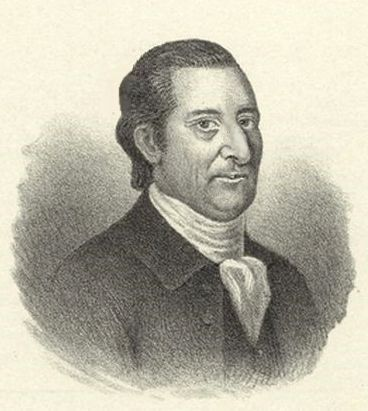
- Goddard c. 1780—1785
- Born: October 10, 1740; New London, Connecticut, British America
- Died: October 23, 1817 (aged 77); Providence, Rhode Island, U.S.
- Resting place: North Burial Ground
- Known for: Colonial publisher, printer, postmaster, postal inspector

William Goddard (October 10, 1740 – December 23, 1817) was an early American patriot, publisher, printer and postal inspector. Born in New London, Connecticut, Goddard lived through the American Revolution and American Revolutionary War, during which he opposed British rule of the colonies through his actions and publications. He was a major figure in the development of the colonial postal system, which became the U.S. Post Office after the American Revolution.

Goddard served as an apprentice printer under James Parker. In 1762, he became an early American publisher who later established four newspapers during the American colonial period, including the Pennsylvania Chronicle, Pennsylvania Gazette, and The Constitutional Courant,, which frequently gave voice to the various patriotic causes. As a printer and publisher Goddard was highly critical of the Stamp Act in 1765 and joined the Sons of Liberty to that end. For a short time he was also a postmaster of Providence, Rhode Island. Goddard's newspaper partnership with Benjamin Franklin in Philadelphia later played an important role in the development of a new postal system in the soon to be united colonies. Through his association with Franklin, who was then serving as postmaster of British North America in Philadelphia, Goddard played a major role in the introduction of new postal routes, reforms and other improvements to the colonial postal system, efforts which are often only attributed to Franklin.

== Early life ==
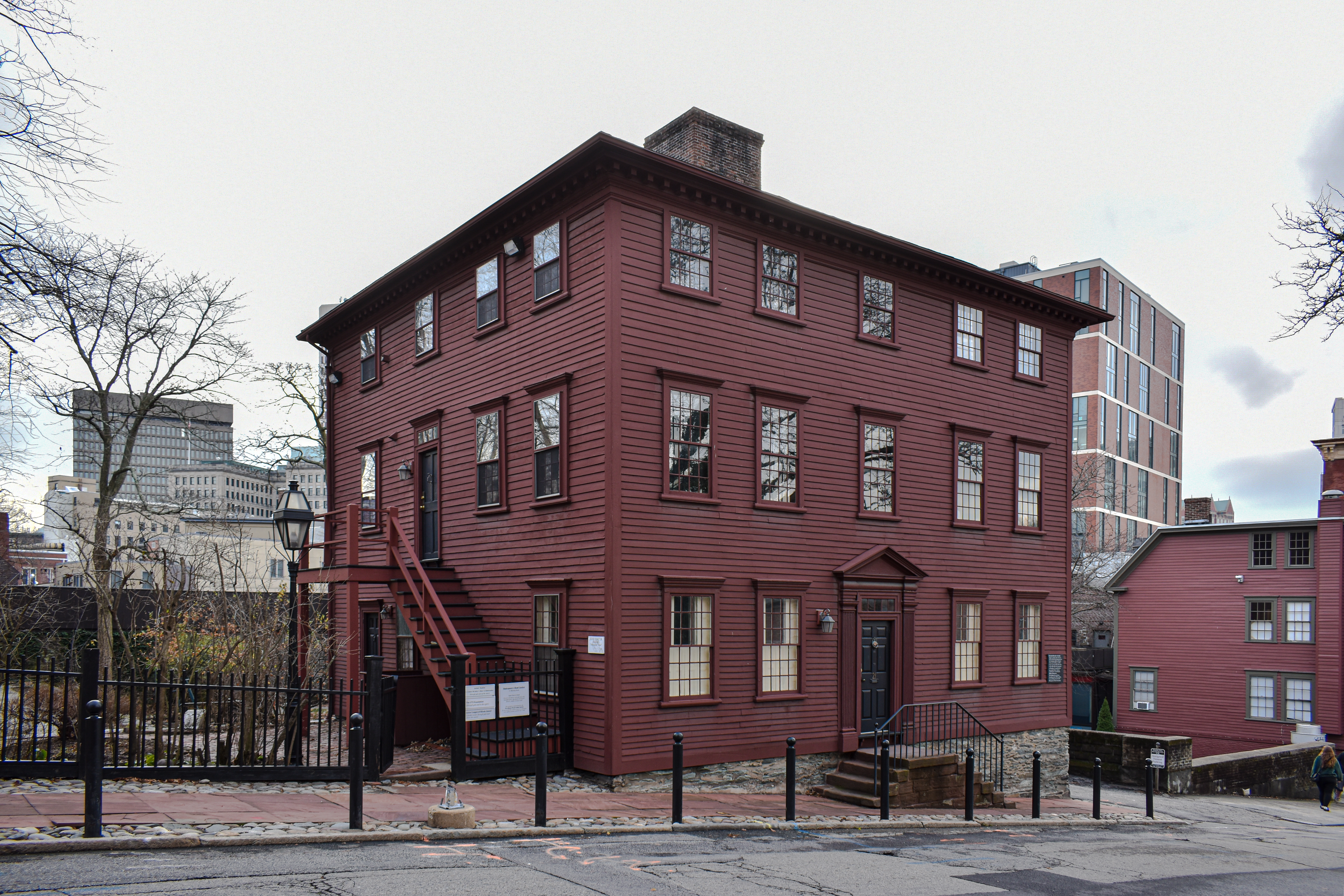
John Carter, friend and colleague of Goddard, printed The Providence Gazette in the basement of his home in Providence, Rhode Island

Goddard was born to a well-to-do family on October 10, 1740, in New London, Connecticut. He was the son of William Giles Goddard, a wealthy doctor and the postmaster of New London, and was himself once postmaster of Providence for two years. His mother was Sarah Updike Goddard, the daughter of Lodowick Updike, whose English and Dutch ancestors were among the first settlers of Rhode Island, and who was also well educated and later ran the family printing business.

Goddard had an older sister, Mary Katherine, who was involved with the family business because she was inspired by her father to become a printer. William served as an apprentice printer for six years under James Parker starting in 1755 and worked in his New Haven, Connecticut, print shop. A few months after his arrival, he was given an assignment to travel through Connecticut to determine what it would cost to set up post offices for the colonial forces during the French and Indian Wars.

Goddard later worked in Parker's printing house in New York City in 1758, where he functioned as a journeyman. Samuel Farley arrived from Bristol, England, in 1760, and the following year established the New-York American Chronicle, a newspaper for which Goddard and Charles Crouch became his journeymen in his print shop. Then, in 1762, a fire gutted Farley's print shop, destroying most of his supplies, ending his newspaper.

Goddard's father died in 1762 and soon after his mother moved the family to Providence, Rhode Island. Goddard opened his first printing office in Providence in July with a £300 loan from his mother, becoming the first printer of the city. With the help of his mother and sister, he started The Providence Gazette and Country Journal, with the first issue being printed on October 20, 1762. He competed for Rhode Island's business with Franklin's press already established in Newport. This was the only newspaper printed in Providence before 1775. Goddard was the publisher and editor of Providence's first newspaper and his friend John Carter was the printer.

As a newspaper printer and publisher, Goddard subscribed to the ideal of a free and open press. However, his commitment to the ideal was tempered; he maintained that a free and open press "does not consist in publishing all the trash which every rancorous, illiberal, anonymous scribbler" submitted to a newspaper, and that any such freedom had to be employed with a measure of discernment and a responsibility to the truth.

== Career ==
Goddard quit the family's printing company in Rhode Island because he was not making the income that he expected. He suspended the newspaper with issue number 134 on May 11, 1765, and left his mother in charge of the business. He found a job with the New York City publisher John Holt and became a silent partner with him. After a couple of months, he returned to Providence and published on August 24, 1765, an issue of the Gazette about the controversy of the Stamp Act of 1765. The newspaper was on the verge of going out of business, until Goddard published number 135 on August 9, 1766. At that time the newspaper was published under the name of "Sarah Goddard & Company," and the Stamp Act had been repealed. Later, Goddard then sent Samuel Inslee to assist his mother in the family business, but he retired with the issue printed on September 19, 1767. His friend John Carter, who had just left Franklin's print shop in Philadelphia, became a partner with the Goddard's family business. Carter assisted in printing the weekly newspaper until, he purchased the business from them in November 1768. He became the successor of Goddard's Providence Gazette newspaper and started publishing it alone, beginning with issue of November 12, 1768. Goddard's mother died on January 5, 1770.

In 1765 Benjamin Franklin was in London as an agent for Pennsylvania. When he opposed the enactment of the Stamp Act in 1765, knowing beforehand, however, that passage of the controversial bill was inevitable, he acquiesced, while actually working for its repeal and appealing to colonial sentiment. In the meantime the people of Pennsylvania suspected Franklin of supporting the Act. To counter the criticism aimed at Franklin over his apparent involvement in the passage of the Stamp Act William Goddard reprinted almost the entire collection of Franklin essays from London papers in the Pennsylvania Chronicle which summarized Franklin's involvement and underlying opposition to the passage of this act. The role Goddard and Franklin played through the Pennsylvania Chronicle in relation to the Stamp Act marked a significant change in Pennsylvania colonial history and its politics, as the passage of the act effected a division in the Quaker Party which had always prevailed in the Pennsylvania Assembly. (Note: Various Quaker party leaders preferred to acquiesce passively to the Stamp Act, while the Proprietary Party, allied with Franklin stood firmly against it.)

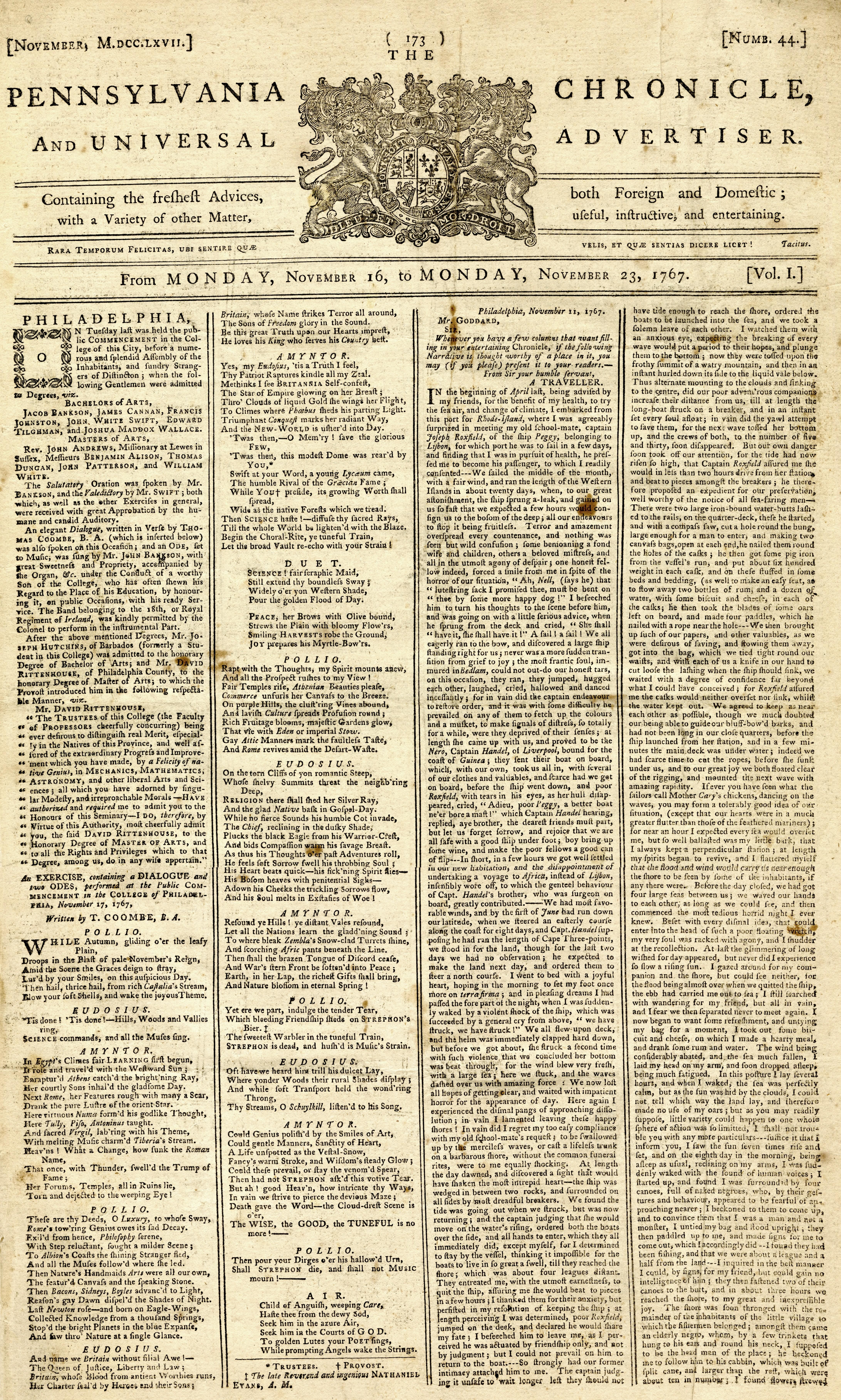
Pennsylvania Chronicle and Universal Advertiser, November 23, 1767, issue

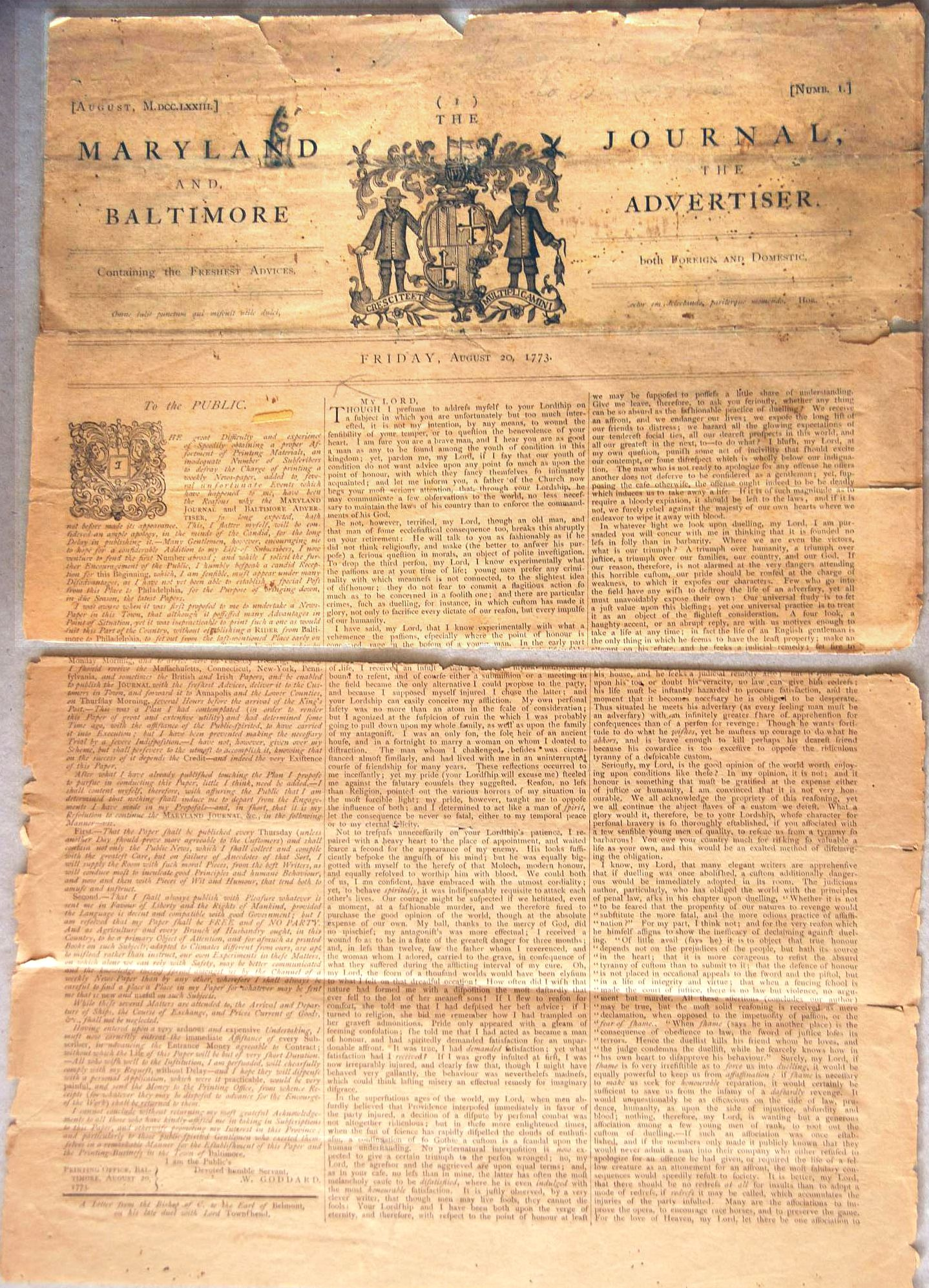
The Maryland Journal and Baltimore Advertiser, February 15, 1785, issue

Goddard meanwhile had joined the Sons of Liberty. Goddard was an anti-imperialist and a defender of the freedom of the press. He fought both the Loyalists and the Patriot to maintain freedom of the press and freedom of expression. Just before the Stamp Act of 1765 was to take effect in November, Goddard founded The Constitutional Courant which openly criticized the act in strong language. Under the assumed name of Andrew Marvel, Goddard secretly had the newspaper printed at Woodbridge, New Jersey, in the shop of James Parker, which was released on September 21, 1765. Its release caused much alarm and controversy resulting in extensive discussion and deliberations when it was sold on the streets of New York City. It consisted primarily of two essays that bitterly condemned the stamp tax. Goddard opened a print shop in June 1766 in Philadelphia in partnership with Joseph Galloway and Thomas Wharton and rented one of Franklin's old print presses. Galloway was the speaker of the Pennsylvania Assembly and promised Goddard the government's printing jobs, and Wharton was a successful merchant.

Goddard purchased the first printing press made in the American colonies in 1769 from Isaac Doolittle after the latter successfully manufactured the large iron screw required in the pressing mechanism of the printing press. This marked the beginning of printing press manufacturing in America.

Goddard established as the mouthpiece of the Anti-Proprietary party the Pennsylvania Chronicle and Universal Advertiser on January 26, 1767. He founded the Pennsylvania Chronicle to rival David Hall's Pennsylvania Gazette (Note: Hall was a printer and business partner with Benjamin Franklin with the Pennsylvania Gazette.) and William Bradford's Pennsylvania Journal, who became silent partners with Goddard. During this time Goddard had employed Isaac Collins in his print shop. (Note: Collins would later go on to establish The New- Jersey Gazette in 1777, New Jersey's first newspaper.) The Galloway and Wharton partnership soon dissolved over disagreements about debts, and Goddard continued the newspaper alone until the last issue, number 368 on February 8, 1774. Goddard published a seventy-two-page pamphlet The Partnership in 1770, accusing his partners Galloway and Wharton, two of the city's most creditable citizens, of attempting to destroy his business. In retaliation, Galloway and Wharton had Goddard imprisoned for debt in September 1771, having to serve three weeks.

Goddard's Philadelphia business was floundering, so he decided to start over again. He bought the printing equipment and type from the widow of Nicholas Hasselbach, Baltimore's first printer, who had unexpectedly died a few years before. (Note: Hasselach, returning to Germany on a business venture in the winter months of 1769–1770, was lost at sea.) He then established Baltimore's first newspapers the Maryland Journal and Baltimore Advertiser, with the first issue on August 20, 1773. The newspapers were printed with the type obtained from Hasselbach. He informed his readers that he would publish all kinds of material of intelligence, foreign or domestic, that would be of interest to the Publick, like notices of the departure of ships, current prices of goods, the course of exchange, accidents, deaths, and events of every kind. Goddard wanted to devote more time to the development of the colonial postal system, so he turned over the management of the Journal to his sister. It was published under her name Mary Katherine Goddard, starting on May 10, 1775. It later became a semi-weekly on March 14, 1783. Goddard would again take over the publication of the newspaper on January 2, 1784.

Goddard's association with Benjamin Franklin in Philadelphia would play an important role in the development of the Continental Congress postal system in the soon to be united colonies. Franklin was postmaster of Philadelphia from 1759 to 1775, when he was dismissed by the British Crown for exposing the letters of Massachusetts Governor Thomas Hutchinson. Goddard's postal system ideas and concepts replaced the existing British postal system and helped Franklin to introduce many of the reforms and improvements needed in the colonial postal system currently in use. Goddard was given the post of surveyor in the system, and his sister was named postmistress of Baltimore, making her the first woman appointed to a federal office of the United States.

In 1778, paper became very scarce because of the American Revolutionary War, prompting Goddard to establish a paper factory near Baltimore, making his own paper for the Maryland Journal. While Goddard was working for the post office, his sister Mary, in his absence, managed and edited the Maryland Journal single handedly. In its issue of May 5, 1778, appears the following notice: "Rags for the paper-mill near this town are much wanted, and the highest price will be given for them by the printer", and again "Cash will be given in exchange for rags at this office."

Mary was joined sometime after mid-1778 at the Maryland Journal by Eleazer Oswald, a former American artillery officer. Oswald printed criticisms of George Washington by the disgraced general Charles Lee and this led to public demonstrations against him. While publishing the Pennsylvania Chronicle, Goddard sold paper to the New York printer John Holt. On June 8, 1779, Colonel Eleazer Oswald, considered a distinguished officer in the Colonial army, formed a business connection with Goddard at Baltimore. He ended his activities as a printer by an almost twenty-year stay in Baltimore. Oswald left the Journal and moved to Philadelphia in 1782.

Goddard helped set up the first press in Alexandria, Virginia, as a silent partner. His newspapers, like many others, printed advertisements for slave sales, brokered through printing offices. As revolutionary sentiments grew and the revolution with Britain drew closer, Goddard's mother and sister took over operations at the Gazette for him, when he devoted his time and money in other business matters with Franklin and merchants.

=== The Constitutional Post ===
Franklin had made significant contributions to the postal system in the colonies while serving as the postmaster of Philadelphia from 1737 to 1753, and as joint postmaster general of the colonies from 1753 to 1774. Because of Franklin's rebellious political stances, he was dismissed from the postal service in 1774, which brought about a flurry of protests from the Americans. Among the most outspoken was Goddard, who established his Constitutional Post to give the colonists sympathetic to the revolutionary cause a private communication network free from British eyes. Officials of the British postal system at the time began opening private correspondence mail for investigating. They also were interfering with the delivery of newspapers, which was the main means of getting news to the colonies. Goddard's newspapers became a sympathizer to the Patriot cause, and the British hindered the delivery of them, even banning altogether the delivery of some. Because of this, Goddard decided to design a new post delivery system for them. He started with his first post office delivery point at the London Coffee House in Philadelphia, a meeting place for merchants which became the center of much of the political life of the city prior to and during the revolution. Goddard established another in Baltimore. Because of war time activity with few people sending mail, and mail thieves taking advantage of the instability of the war, Goddard's experiment with the new postal route proved unsuccessful.

He first made known his post office project in the Maryland Journal and Baltimore Advertiser on July 2, 1774. He brought into existence 28 other post offices in several colonies. The colonies paid a subscription to Goddard for the service which was further improved with the net revenues. This became the foundation for the United States Post Office Department. A side benefit of Goddard's ideas ultimately lead to the United States Postal Inspection Service.

Goddard had hired his own post riders and created a postal system that came to be known as The Constitutional Post, which would provide mail service to the colonies between New York and Philadelphia. Goddard established a system of postal routes and post offices, which presence and use brought about the discontinuance of the British postal system. Known as Goddard's Post Offices, it was a private enterprise and competed with the British postal system. Goddard stressed the idea that the various Constitutional Post Offices should be under the jurisdiction of a central government. (Note: For an outline of the eight proposed reforms proposed by Goddard see Huebner, 1906, Our Postal System) He ran the new mail service as a private concern. It was so efficient that the Continental Congress, on May 29, 1775, took the first step and appointed a committee headed by Franklin and worked out its organization as an independent postal establishment. It was named The Constitutional Post. On July 26, 1775, Congress officially developed the new nation's first postal system. Goddard's oversight and organization at that time was operating from New Hampshire to Georgia. Congress, needing to deal with other urgent matters, delayed Goddard's proposed plan until after the Battles of Lexington and Concord in the Spring of 1775.

Goddard's Constitutional Post plan was ultimately implemented, assuring communication between the colonies and keeping them informed of various events during the conflict with Britain. Distrustful of the Crown, the colonial populace was turning to and using the postal system now provided by Goddard. Ultimately, Goddard and his revolutionary post was so successful that it finally forced the Crown post out of business in the American colonies by Christmas Day 1775, when the king's last postrider delivered mail. Goddard's Constitutional Post proved to be a success and by 1775, his post system was flourishing with 30 post offices delivering mail between Portsmouth, New Hampshire, and Colonial Williamsburg. Goddard's plan for a colonial post office would be one that was established and maintained by popular subscription and would be managed and controlled by a private committee that would be elected annually by the subscribers. The committee would appoint postmasters, determine postal routes, hire post-riders and fix the rates of postage. In what was to Goddard an unexpected turn of events, when the Continental Congress authorized a post office run by the government, it passed over Goddard and instead named Benjamin Franklin as the first American Postmaster General.

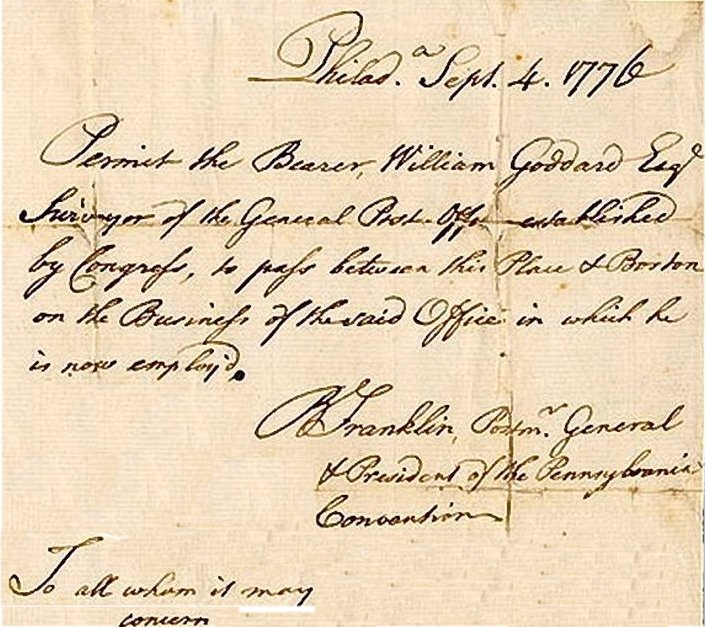
Pass by Postmaster General Benjamin Franklin appointed Goddard as Surveyor of the Post, giving him the authority to travel as needed to investigate and inspect postal routes and to ensure mail delivery.

Recognition of Goddard's role in the development and implementation of the U. S. Post Office has been largely ignored by many historians until recently. Goddard, a one time apprentice of Franklin and who was naturally influenced by his years of experience with the colonial postal system, still felt that he was the general creator of the postal system then in use in the colonies. Goddard was a candidate for the position of postmaster-general, but instead Franklin was chosen. He then sought the secretaryship but was passed over when Franklin selected his son-in-law Richard Bache. Franklin, however, recognized and appreciated Goddard's many efforts in organizing the colonial post-office system and appointed him as Surveyor of the Posts. There has always been an American postal system in place ever since the establishment of Goddard's post offices in 1774.

Goddard was disappointed when Franklin was given the position of Postmaster-General by the Continental Congress. However, he conceded to Franklin, who was 36 years his senior and had many years of experience as postmaster, and reluctantly agreed to serve instead as Riding Surveyor for the new U.S. Post Office. Franklin drew up a pass that allowed Goddard to travel at his discretion in his new position. Franklin authored and signed the pass and presented it to Goddard. When the newly created American government under the U.S. Constitution began, the American postal system had about seventy-five post offices and 1,875 miles of post roads to serve a total colonial population of three million people. Franklin served as postmaster for one year at which time the Postmaster's position was given to Bache. Deeply disappointed at being passed over again, Goddard resigned. Franklin would later leave the Bonds he had on the Goddards to Bache in his last will and testament of 1788. Franklin died on the evening of April 17, 1790, at the age of 84.

Feeling uninspired over his appointment to Surveyor of the Posts, Goddard, in a letter to Congress, dated June 21, 1776, had recited his services in the establishment of the Constitutional Post Office and reminded the delegates that they had given the Postmaster General no authority to reimburse him and his friends for their outlay of money in "establishing Postmasters, hiring Riders...", and establishing post offices throughout the colonies. Wanting to serve his country at the onset of war, and needing the opportunity to replenish his financial situation, he asked the Congress for an appointment as a lieutenant colonel. The Congress passed on his letter to the Board of War. The Board subsequently referred Goddard's appeal to General Washington, who, on July 29, 1776, in a letter to Congress, expressed the belief that the induction of Mr. Goddard "into the Army as Lieutt. Colo, would be attended with endless confusion." Thereafter no more was heard from Goddard about his military aspirations.

=== American Revolution ===
In 1774, in response to the Boston Tea Party, the British Parliament passed what was referred to by the colonists as the Intolerable Acts. A bill known as the Boston Port Bill was presented at the House of Commons on March 14, 1774. The intrusive bill passed both houses of Parliament with little opposition and was signed by the King a couple of weeks later.

Among other measures the Intolerable Acts closed the port of Boston and radically altered the government of the Massachusetts Bay Colony. Many colonists viewed the acts as an arbitrary violation of their rights, and in response they organized the First Continental Congress on September 5, 1774, at Carpenters' Hall in Philadelphia to establish a representative political body to oppose such laws. When the Boston riots erupted in September 1774 over the Coercive Acts, the colonies had lost much trust of the British Crown entirely. Since most of the Colonists were born in the colonies at that time and had never seen the actual 'mother land' they had very little sentiment left for King George III or for the British authorities in the colonies. As a result, the Continental Congress was convened at Philadelphia in May 1775 to create an independent government that would represent the colonists and oppose the arbitrary rules thrust upon them by the Crown. When Benjamin Franklin began to publicly lend support for the American Revolution he was dismissed from the royal postal service which resulted in widespread protests among the colonists, where Goddard was among the most outspoken. "Constitutional" post offices, (Note: They were sometimes referred to by others as "Goddard" post offices) were established in Baltimore and Philadelphia the same year in which Franklin was dismissed. "Constitutional post office" was the term employed by Goddard to distinguish them from the British system that was currently in operation.

During the few years leading up to the Revolution, Goddard became well noted for the innovations he introduced to the postal system as it came to be employed in mail delivery between the various colonies. Goddard's postal system came about as the result of a series of conflicts involving his newspaper the Pennsylvania Chronicle, and the Crown Post, a postal administration and mail delivery system that was in use in the British colonies prior to the advent of American independence, under the authority of the British crown. As the idea of revolution began to surface throughout the colonies, the British began manipulating the Crown Post by blocking the mail and communications between the various colonies in an effort to prevent them from organizing with each other. The Crown also resorted to the delay or destruction of newspapers and opening and reading private mail, a form of postal censorship that the British crown considered legal. Goddard's Pennsylvania Chronicle was sympathetic to the revolutionary ideas being put forth by Benjamin Franklin and others so Goddard's publications were routinely criticized by and under the constant scrutiny of the Crown Post authorities. Franklin had just fallen from grace with the British monarchy by exposing Massachusetts governor Thomas Hutchinson with his own letters, showing him to be in collusion with British efforts to impose more laws and taxes on the colonies in America. His involvement with the Chronicle further prompted the Crown in their dealings with Goddard's newspaper. In their effort to see the Pennsylvania Chronicle delivered, Franklin and Goddard persevered and in the midst of British scrutiny would create a separate postal system that ultimately became the postal system in use in the United States today. After the war, Goddard became involved in a controversy between Generals Charles Lee and George Washington involving the acrimonious publication of Lee's account of Washington's alleged conduct during the war.

One of the first issues for the delegates was how to collect and deliver the mail between the various colonies. Franklin, who had just come back from England, was made chairman of a Committee of Investigation to start a colonial postal system. The issue was a pressing one as the existing Crown Post was now routinely manipulating the mail of the colonists prior to the revolution. William Goddard experienced the abuse of authority of the Crown Post in Philadelphia after forming a partnership with Benjamin Franklin to publish the Pennsylvania Chronicle, a paper sympathetic to the revolutionary cause. Goddard was one among several publishers who used private carriers rather than those of the British crown to deliver his Chronicle so as to get the newspapers past the scrutiny of the Crown post, who was opposed to Goddard and his Chronicle for their revolutionary sympathies. So adamant was the Crown towards Goddard and the Chronicle, that the local Crown postmaster intercepted and refused to deliver mail and other newspapers from other cities and towns to Goddard, depriving him of a critical source of information. The Crown Post also imposed a heavy tax on newspaper delivery. In 1773, the Pennsylvania Chronicle was finally forced to go out of business.

=== Washington-Lee controversy ===
General Charles Lee was passed over for command of the Continental Army by the Continental Congress who on June 15, 1775, unanimously appointed George Washington to be their commander. A disappointed Lee felt that the command should have been given to him and came to publicly criticize Washington as "...a certain great man who is damnably deficient", following Washington's defeats at the battles of White Plains and Fort Washington, in the fall of 1776.

Some years later Lee had requested Goddard to publish his account of the matter. In the July 6, 1779, issue of the Maryland Journal Goddard had printed General Lee's "Some Queries, Political and Military", which consisted of a three-volume work that contained twenty-five pointed questions about the management of the war by Congress, and the conduct of George Washington in particular. The "Queries" of the court-martialed general incited a Baltimore mob led by three Continental officers who confronted Goddard on the evening of July 8, They demanded at his home that he surrender and appear in front of the Whig club. Goddard grabbed his sword and called Eleazer Oswald (Note: Oswald served as Charles Lee's senior artillery officer at the Battle of Monmouth on June 28, 1778.) to his side. He insisted that he not be treated in such a manner. He agreed to meet the club members in a civilized manner at a local coffee house but was doubtful that they would accept his offer. A mob led by Colonel Samuel Smith caught up with him later and carried him away. Overwhelmed and helpless, Goddard agreed to publicly apologize for publishing Lee's attack on Washington in his paper, which Goddard later repudiated. Goddard and Oswald informed the state authorities of the mob attacks while defending Lee. They also demanded public protection for themselves and their right to freedom of the press, but ultimately had their demands rebuffed. In the July 16 issue of the Maryland Journal, they subsequently published an acrimonious account about why and how they were treated. They championed Lee's cause, printed the correspondence between Oswald and Smith, and retracted the apology that was coerced from Goddard. The long-term consequence of this episode was that Goddard and General Lee became good friends.

In September 1782, Lee, on his way to Philadelphia, stopped for a few days in Baltimore to visit the Goddards. He went on to Philadelphia, where he died October 2. It is not known exactly how the papers of General Lee came into the hands of his friend Goddard. Goddard's original plans to publish the papers never reached fruition. Knowing the controversial and critical nature of the work and that its publication was likely to cause trouble, Goddard, in a letter of May 30, 1785, wrote to Washington informing him that he had received a letter from Lee asking him to publish his work which roundly criticized Washington. Goddard enclosed a hand-written copy of the proposed title page on June 14, and later sent Washington a printed title page as part of his prospectus of Lee's projected three-volume work. The title page read: Miscellaneous Collections from the Papers of the late Major General Charles Lee. Goddard's letter to Washington from Baltimore, dated May 30, 1785, said that the Manuscript Papers of General Lee came into his hands after Lee's death, and he was taking care to prepare them for publicizing by removing offensive material. Washington, in a reply letter of June 11, 1785, to Goddard, referred to the news he had received from him objectively and wrote of his actions that were now in question. Goddard continued to publish his newspaper in Baltimore for thirteen more years and was never again harassed. After Lee died, he left Goddard a sizable portion of his estate.

== Later years ==
Goddard's relationship with his sister Mary Katherine became strained in his last years, possibly over money issues. In January 1784, his name was added to the colophon of the Maryland Journal and Baltimore Advertiser as the main editor while, his sister's name was dropped altogether. Goddard continued to be the head of the newspaper, and his sister remained in the city as a self-publisher. Goddard and his sister had published competing almanacs for 1785, which led him levying attacks at both his sister's almanac and her character. Mary sold her interest in the Maryland Journal in 1785 to Edward Langworthy that ended her business dealings with her brother and the newspaper she had assisted in establishing.

On May 25, 1785, Goddard married Abigail Angell of Johnston, Rhode Island, the daughter of Brigadier-General James Angell and Mary Mawney Angell. The wedding took place at Cranston. They had 5 children: 4 daughters and 1 son. In 1803, he left Johnston for Providence, so his children might have more educational advantages. His son William Giles Goddard graduated from Brown University in 1812 and received an appointment of Professor of Moral Philosophy and Metaphysics.

Goddard in his retirement, helped with the preparation of Isaiah Thomas's History of Printing in America (1810) and was elected a member of the American Antiquarian Society in 1813.

He lived in Providence until his death, December 23, 1817, aged seventy-seven years. He is buried in the North Burial Ground at Providence, Rhode Island. Goddard's son William Giles Goddard wrote his father's obituary for the Rhode Island American newspaper. It contained a passage which read, "The first years of his long life were passed amid the turmoil of useful activities - the last in the bosom of domestic quiet."

== Works ==
- The Partnership: Or the History of the Rise and Progress of the Pennsylvania Chronicle (1770)
- Andrew Marvell's Second Address to the Inhabitants of Philadelphia (1773)
- The Prowess of the Whig Club, and the Manceuvers of Legion (1777)

== See also ==
- Early American publishers and printers
- List of early American publishers and printers
- Bibliography of Benjamin Franklin
- United States Postmaster General
- Postal Service Act
- Postal censorship
- Pony Express
- Postal history

== Bibliography ==
- Adelman, Joseph M. (December 2010). "A Constitutional Conveyance of Intelligence, Public and Private": The Post Office, the Business of Printing, and the American Revolution". Enterprise & Society. 11 (4). Cambridge University Press: 711–754. doi:10.1093/es/khq079. JSTOR 23701246.
- —— (Fall 2013). "Trans-Atlantic Migration and the Printing Trade in Revolutionary America". Early American Studies. 11 (3). University of Pennsylvania Press: 516–544. doi:10.1353/eam.2013.0026. JSTOR 23547682. S2CID 144423922.
- Alden, John Richard (1951). General Charles Lee, traitor or patriot?. Louisiana State University Press.
- Adelman, Joseph M. (2021). Revolutionary Networks. Johns Hopkins University Press.
- Ashley, Perry J. (1985). American Newspaper Journalists, 1690-1872. Vol. 43. Gale Research Company. ISBN 978-0-8103-17215.
- Boatner, Mark M. III (1994). Encyclopedia of the American Revolution: Oswald, Eleazer. Mechanicsburg, Pa.: New York : D. McKay Co. ISBN 0-679-50440-0.
- Carroll, Hugh F. (1907). Printers and printing in Providence, 1762–1907. Providence Typographical Union. No. 33.
- Cutter, William Richard (1915). New England Families, Genealogy and Memorial. Vol. IV. Lewis Historical Publishing Company.
- Fagerstrom, Bethel College, Saint Paul, Dalphy I. (April 1963). "Reviewed Work: Benjamin Franklin by Richard E. Amacher". The William and Mary Quarterly. Omohundro Institute of Early American History and Culture: 317–319. JSTOR 1919323.
- Frasca, Ralph (2006). Benjamin Franklin's printing network: disseminating virtue in early America. University of Missouri Press. ISBN 978-0-8262-16144.
- Freeman, Douglas Southall (1954) [1948]. George Washington, Patriot and President. Vol. 6. Charles Schriber's Sons.
- Grizzard, Frank E. Jr. (2002). George Washington: A Biographical Companion. ABC-CLIO. ISBN 978-1-57607-082-6.
- Hallett, Brien (2016). The Powers of the U.S. Congress. ABC-CLIO.
- Huebner, Francis C. (1906). "Our Postal System". Records of the Columbia Historical Society, Washington, D.C. 9. Historical Society of Washington, D.C.: 126–174. JSTOR 40066939.
- Isaacson, Walter (2003). Benjamin Franklin: An American Life. New York: Simon & Schuster. ISBN 978-0-7432-5807-4.
- Kent, Allen, ed. (1968). Encyclopedia of Library and Information Science: Printers and Printing: Arabic Printing to Public Policy: Copyright, and Information Technology. Vol. 24. New York: Dekker. ISBN 0-8247-2024-5.
- Leonard, Eugenie Andruss (October 1950). "Paper as a Critical Commodity during the American Revolution". The Pennsylvania Magazine of History and Biography. 74 (4). University of Pennsylvania Press: 488–499. JSTOR 20088183.
- Malone, Dumas (1931). Dictionary of American Biography. Vol. 7. Charles Scribner's Sons. OCLC 928819706.
- Martin, Robert W.T. (Winter 1994). "From the 'Free and Open' Press to the 'Press of Freedon': Liberalism, Republicanism and early American Press Liberty". History of Political Thought. 15 (4). Imprint Academic Ltd.: 505–534. JSTOR 26215846.
- McKerns, Joseph P. (1989). Biographical Dictionary of American Journalism. Greenwood. ISBN 978-0-313-23819-2.
- McMurtrie, Douglas Crawford (1936). A History of Printing in the United States. Greenwood.
- Miner, Ward L. (1962). William Goddard: Newspaperman. Duke University Press.
- Rich, Wesley Everett (1924). The history of the United States Post Office to the year 1829. Cambridge, Harvard University Press.
- Roden, Robert F. (1905). The Cambridge Press, 1638–1692. New York: Dodd, Mead, and Company.
- Scharf, John Thomas (1874). The chronicles of Baltimore. Baltimore : Turnbull Bros.
- Scharf, John Thomas (1881). History of Baltimore City and County, from the Earliest Period to the Present Day. L.H. Everts.
- Smith, William (January 1916). "The Colonial Post-Office". The American Historical Review. 21 (2). Oxford University Press on behalf of the American Historical Association: 258–275. doi:10.2307/1835049. JSTOR 1835049.
- Taylor, Alan (2016). American Revolutions A Continental History, 1750–1804. W.W. Norton & Company. ISBN 978-0-393-35476-8.
- Taylor, Jordan E. (July 17, 2020). "Enquire of the Printer: Newspaper Advertising and the Moral Economy of the North American Slave Trade, 1704–1807". Early American Studies. 18 (3): 287–323. doi:10.1353/eam.2020.0008. ISSN 1559-0895. S2CID 226615866. Archived from the original on December 31, 2020.
- Thayer, Theodore (January 1947). "The Quaker Party of Pennsylvania, 1755-1765". The Pennsylvania Magazine of History and Biography. 71 (1). University of Pennsylvania Press: 19–43. JSTOR 20087883.
- Thomas, Isaiah (1874). The history of printing in America, with a biography of printers. Vol. I. New York, B. Franklin.
- —— (1874). The history of printing in America, with a biography of printers. Vol. II. New York, B. Franklin.
- Weeks, Lyman Horace (1916). A History of Paper-manufacturing in the United States, 1690–1916. Lockwood trade journal Company.
- Wheeler, Joseph Towne (1938). The Maryland Press, 1777–1790. Maryland Historical Society.
- Wonning, Paul R. (2021). A Short History of Mail Delivery. Independent.
- Woods, J. C. B. (2019). John Carter of Providence, Rhode Island. Creative Media Partners, LLC.
- Wroth, Lawrence C. (1922). A History of Printing in Colonial Maryland, 1686–1776 (Baltimore, Md., 1922. Baltimore : Typothetae of Baltimore.
- Yost, Edna (1961). Famous American pioneering women. New York, Dodd, Mead.
- "William Goddard, Journalist". The New York Times. New York, New York. July 15, 1894. p. 15 – via Newspapers.com.
- William Colfax Markham (August 6, 1951). "You May Find It Here". The Van Nuys News. Van Nuys, California. p. 2 – via Newspapers.com.
- "Baltimore Heritage". Archived from the original on July 31, 2010.
- "Goddard's Constitutional Post Offices". The Madison County Record. Huntsville, Arkansas. June 26, 2014. p. B7 – via Newspapers.com.
- Frederic J. Haskin (September 22, 1937). "Goddard of the Post Office". The Morning Call. Allentown, Pennsylvania. p. 10 – via Newspapers.com.
- Anold De Vil (March 12, 1938). "Who Was Goddard?". The News-Herald. Franklin, Pennsylvania. p. 4 – via Newspapers.com.
- "Old Postal Service". The Richmond Item. Richmond, Indiana. September 18, 1937. p. 4 – via Newspapers.com.
- "American Public University". Archived from the original on April 2, 2010.
- Society, The (1792). "Petition of William Bollan to the House of Commons". Collections of the Massachusetts Historical Society. 9 (6). Massachusetts Historical Trust Fund: 364.
- "William Goddard, Journalist; Great-Grandparent of Mr. C. Oliver Iselin's Bride. Full article links to PDF file". New York Times. July 15, 1894. Archived from the original on November 10, 2012.
- Zimmerman, John L. (October 1954). "Benjamin Franklin and the Pennsylvania Chronicle". The Pennsylvania Magazine of History and Biography. 81 (4). University of Pennsylvania Press: 351–364. JSTOR 20089013.

Online sources

- "The U.S. Post Office, 1775–1974". American Heritage Magazine. Archived from the original on March 7, 2011.
- "William Goddard, Behind the Badge: The U.S. Postal Inspection Service". Smithsonian National Postal Museum.
- Bellis, Mary (2016). "History of United States Postal Service". Archived from the original on April 27, 2012.
- "Smithsonian National Postal Museum". Archived from the original on June 23, 2021.
- "The Providence Gazette, and Country Journal, Oct. 20, 1762-Jan. 3, 1795". Library of Congress. The Library of Congress. Archived from the original on December 21, 2017.
- "Journalism Department University of Rhode Island". Archived from the original on September 27, 2010.
- "Independence Hall Association, Philadelphia, Pennsylvania, founded 1942". Archived from the original on June 26, 2010.
- "American Antiquarian Society Members Directory". Archived from the original on June 12, 2017.
- Crane, Verner W., Ph.D. (March 1942). "Franklin's Political Journalism in England" (PDF). 233 (3). University of Michigan.

=== Further reading ===
- Fracus, Ralph (May 2006). "The Emergence of the American Colonial Press". Pennsylvania Legacies. 6 (1). University of Pennsylvania Press: 11–15. JSTOR 27765021.
- Hudak, Leona M. (1978). Early American Women Printers and Publishers, 1639–1820. Scarecrow Press. ISBN 978-0-8108-11195.
- Reese, William S. (1990). The First Hundred Years of Printing in British North America: Printers and Collectors. American Antiquarian Society. ISBN 978-0-9440-26199.
- Wolley, Mary Emma (1894). J. Franklin Jameson (ed.). The early history of the colonial post-office. Rhode Island Historical Society.
- "The Founding Fathers: Pennsylvania: Benjamin Franklin, Pennsylvania". The National Archives.
- Tracts of the American Revolution, 1763–1776
