= Edward Langworthy =

Edward Langworthy may refer to:

- Edward Langworthy (Founding Father), teacher, Founding Father and signer of the Articles of Confederation
- Edward Langworthy (Iowa businessman), Iowa pioneer, businessman and territorial legislator
- Edward Ryley Langworthy, British businessman and Liberal politician
