= Lawrence C. Wroth =

American historian (1884–1970)

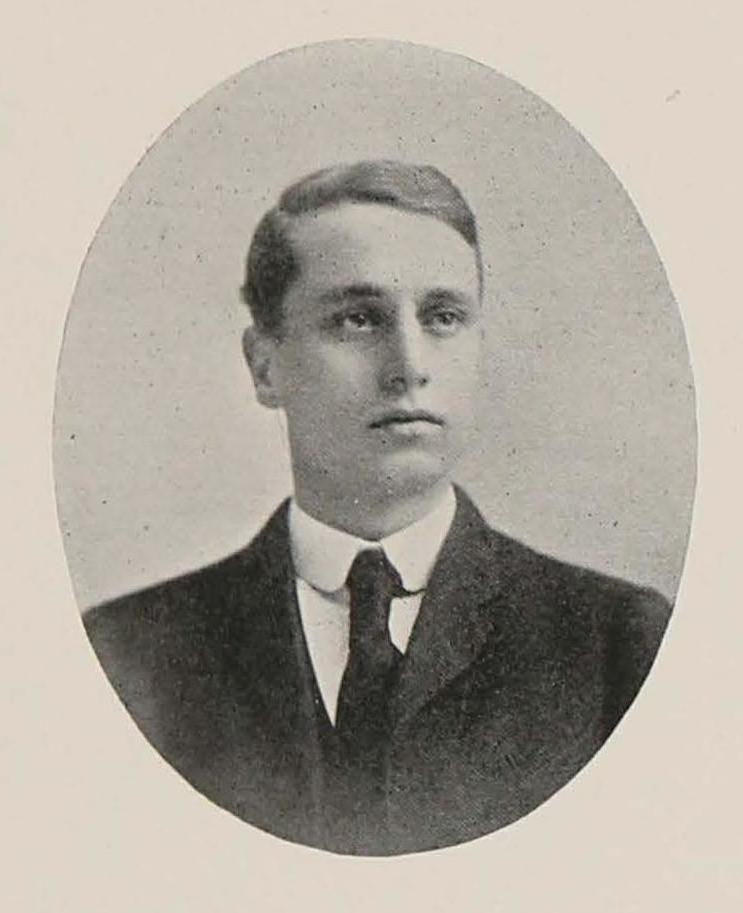
- Born: January 14, 1884; Baltimore
- Died: December 25, 1970
- Education: Johns Hopkins University
- Occupations: Librarian, historian, bibliographer, bibliologist, university teacher, writer
- Employer: Brown University

Lawrence Counselman Wroth (January 14, 1884 – December 25, 1970) was an American historian and the author of The Colonial Printer, the definitive book on the American printing trade during the period of 1639 through 1800. Though he wrote hundreds of articles or books, Wroth was also a librarian and research professor.

== Early life and education ==
Wroth was born in Baltimore, Maryland in 1884, the son of an Episcopal clergyman.

In 1905, Wroth graduated from Johns Hopkins University and wrote his first published article, "Sanitation in the Country House", which appeared in the magazine Country Life in America.

He served with the 110th and 111th Field Artillery in World War I during the period of 1917 to 1919 in France.

== Career ==
=== Author ===
His first book, published in 1911, Parson Weems; a biographical and critical study, was a biography of George Washington's biographer.

Though Wroth wrote more than 550 pieces, he is most notable for two books on colonial printing: A History of Printing in Colonial Maryland: 1686-1776, published in 1922; and The Colonial Printer, published in 1931, which studied the printing trade during the American colonial period. Both books detailed the first colonial printing presses, colonial printing houses, typeset, printing ink, paper, journeymen, apprentices, conditions of the trade, and bookbinding. The content and finish of the completed books, pamphlets, and papers of the period are also discussed. Wroth expressly stated that the book was written "as a discussion of certain fundamental aspects of cultural history" and that the book was not intended as an "essay in bibliophilism", though his love of books is evident:

"To love the contents of a book and care nothing about the volume itself, to love the treasure and to be unmindful of the earthen vessel that loyally holds and preserves it, is to be only half a lover, deaf to a whole series of notes in the gamut of emotion. The book lover, more richly endowed, broods over the hand that fashioned the volume he reads, and, like the Tramp-Royal, he goes on until he dies observing the different ways that different things are done, the materials, the processes, the how and what and why of the ancient mysteries of printing, paper making, type founding, ink making, press building, and binding."

In his publications on printing in colonial America, Wroth notably included the history of colonial women printers, such as Dinah Nuthead, Anne Catherine Hoof Green, Sarah Updike Goddard, Clementina Rind, and Mary Goddard.

Essays Honoring Lawrence C. Wroth was published by the Library of Congress in 1951. His last book, published in 1970, The voyages of Giovanni da Verrazzano, 1524-1528, was also a biography.

=== Librarian ===
In addition to writing, Wroth had a parallel career as a librarian. He worked at the Maryland Diocesan Library in Baltimore from 1905 to 1912 before becoming assistant librarian at Baltimore's Enoch Pratt Free Library from 1912 to 1923. While at Brown University in Providence, Rhode Island, Wroth served as librarian of the John Carter Brown Library for 35 years (1924 — 1957), and held a university post as research professor of American History (1932–1965).

== Sources ==
- Wroth, Lawrence C. (1995). The Colonial Printer. New York: Courier Dover Publications. ISBN 0-486-28294-5.
- Wroth, Lawrence C. (1922). A History of Printing in Colonial Maryland: 1686-1776. Baltimore: Typothetae.
- Wroth, Lawrence Counselman, and James Loveday. 1934. An American Bookshelf, 1775. [An Account of the Library of James Loveday, as Reflecting the Contemporary Social Background.]. Philadelphia: University of Pennsylvania Press.
