= The Providence Gazette =

Colonial-era newspaper in Providence, Rhode Island, United States

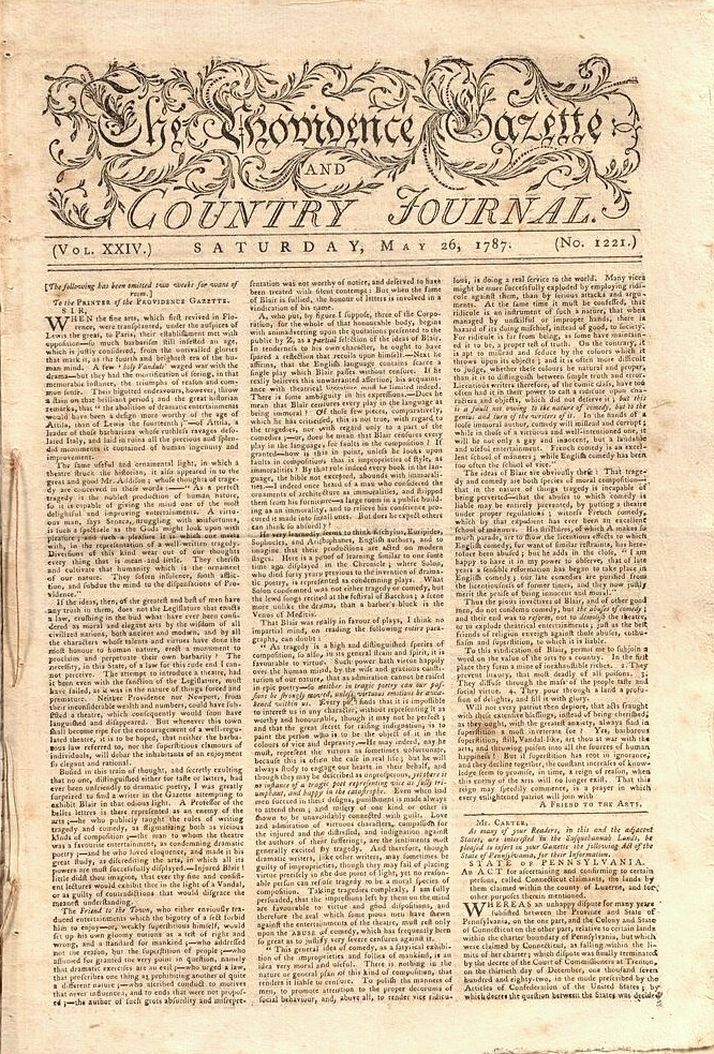
The Providence Gazette May 26, 1787

The Providence Gazette was an American Revolutionary War era newspaper, and the only newspaper printed in Providence before 1775. It was first published October 20, 1762, by William Goddard and his partner John Carter in the basement of his Providence home, on a sheet of crown size, folio; an image of the king's arms decorated the title. It was printed every Saturday, from types of English and long primer. In 1768 Carter became the sole proprietor of the newspaper.

The Gazette was one among many such publications that published attacks on the Stamp Act which was roundly opposed by the colonists, and especially by the printing and publishing trade which was required to print on stamped paper, forcing the prices of newspapers and pamphlets to increase. It often published a variety of letters sent to Goddard protesting the act. Goddard discontinued his newspaper from May 11, to August 24, 1765. It started up again in January 1767 where it was operating under William and his older sister, Mary Katherine Goddard. It wasn't until August 9, 1766, when the Stamp Act had been repealed, did The Gazette begin a permanent existence. The Gazette proved to be one of the definitive newspapers which gave a special significance of the eighteenth-century American press.

When Benjamin Franklin became Postmaster General on July 26, 1775, he appointed Goddard as Surveyor of the Posts where he set out to inspect the post offices and postal routes of the colonies. His older sister Mary Katherine Goddard assumed full control of the newspaper.

The paper was published weekly and passionately defended the rights of the colonies before the revolution and ably supported the cause of the country during the war. After the war when American independence was established The Providence Gazette continued to promote federal Republican principles.

== See also ==
- Early American publishers and printers
- History of American newspapers
- Freedom of the press in the United States

== Bibliography ==
- Carroll, Hugh F. Carroll (1907). Printers and printing in Providence, 1762–1907. Providence Typographical Union. No. 33.
- Miner, Ward L. (1962). William Goddard: Newspaperman. Duke University Press.
- Thomas, Isaiah (1874). The history of printing in America, with a biography of printers. Vol. II. New York, B. Franklin.
- Yost, Edna (1961). Famous American pioneering women. New York, Dodd, Mead.
- Wroth, Lawrence C. (1938). The Colonial Printer. Portland, Me., The Southworth-Anthoensen press.
- Zimmerman, John L. (October 1954). "Benjamin Franklin and the Pennsylvania Chronicle". The Pennsylvania Magazine of History and Biography. 81 (4). University of Pennsylvania Press: 351–364. JSTOR 20089013.
