= Pennsylvania Chronicle =

American colonial newspaper

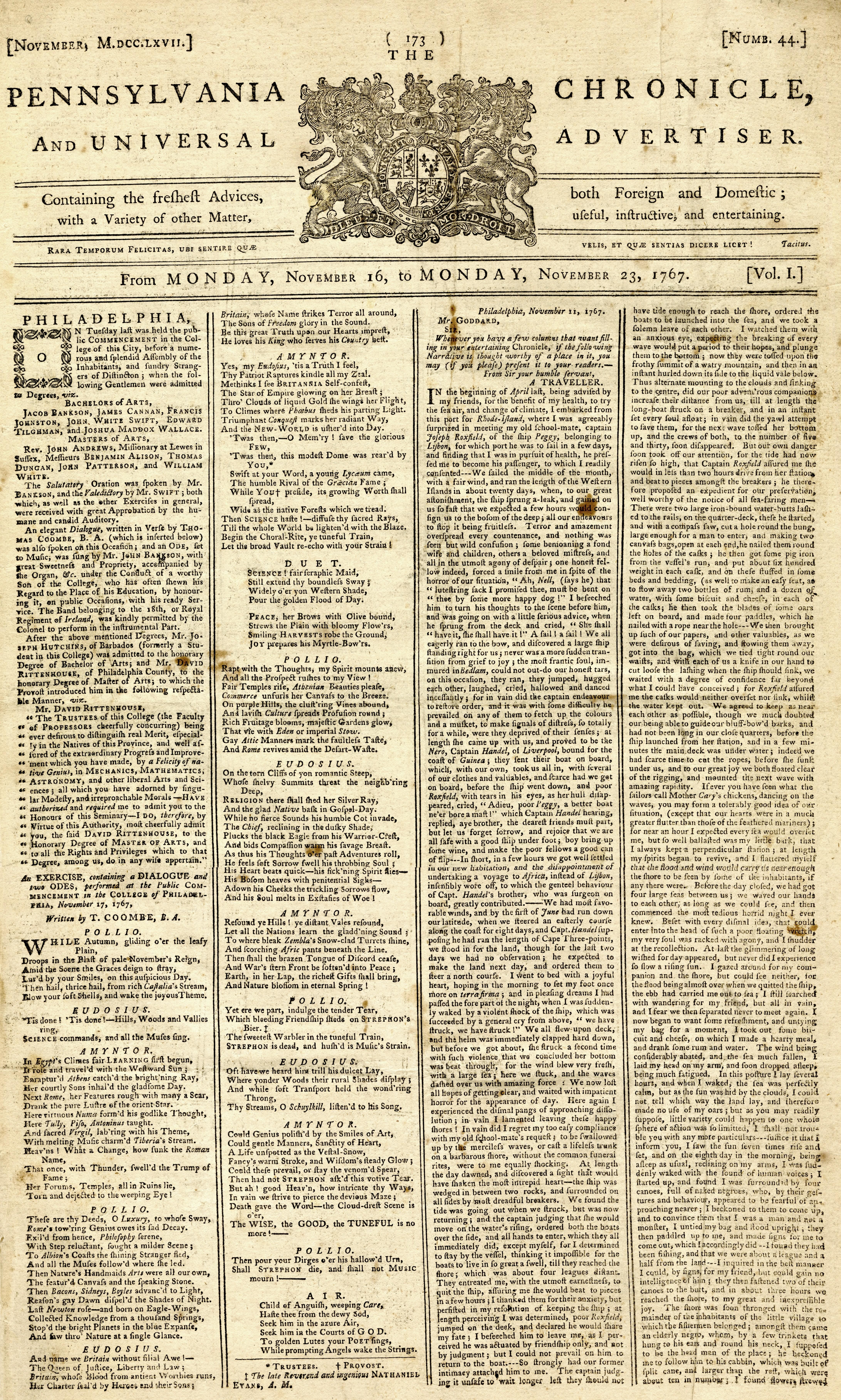
The November 23, 1767 issue of Pennsylvania Chronicle and Universal Advertiser

The Pennsylvania Chronicle and Universal Advertiser was an American colonial newspaper founded in 1767 that was published in Philadelphia, Pennsylvania, prior to the American Revolution. It was founded by William Goddard and his silent business partners Joseph Galloway and Thomas Wharton. Benjamin Franklin, an associate of Galloway, was also a partner with the Chronicle.

The newspaper was established to challenge the power of the Penn family and ultimately the Crown authorities who at that time were placing laws and taxes on the colonists without fair representation in the British Parliament.

The Chronicle was published once a week on a Monday, the first issue being released on January 6, 1767, and was printed from a new Bourgeois type set by Goddard's printing company in Philadelphia, The New Printing Office, on Market Street, near the post office. The annual subscription rate was ten shillings. The publication maintained operations from January 6, 1767, until February 8, 1774.

In 1768, William's sister, Mary Katherine Goddard, who later became the first woman to be a postmaster in Maryland, joined and managed her brother's printing office in Philadelphia.

By 1770 the Pennsylvania Chronicle had a circulation of about twenty-five hundred, making it one of the most successful colonial newspapers.

In the middle of the 18th century most of the printing presses that were in use in the American colonies were imported from England. Isaac Doolittle, a New-Haven watch and clock-maker, built the mahogany printing press for Goddard's Pennsylvania Chronicle in Philadelphia. It was the first printing press built in the American colonies.

Goddard's newspaper was not without its competition. A rival Philadelphia printer, William Bradford III, founder of The Pennsylvania Journal and Weekly Advertiser in 1742 conducted a newspaper war against Goddard that digressed into personal attacks.

During this time Galloway and Wharton had sold their shares of the Chronicle to a Robert Towne, who in turn made many attempts to persuade Goddard to sell his newspaper to him. After Goddard publicly criticized Galloway and Wharton he subsequently found himself jailed for debt in September 1771, no doubt at the prompting of the influential Galloway.

== Chronicle a revolutionary voice ==
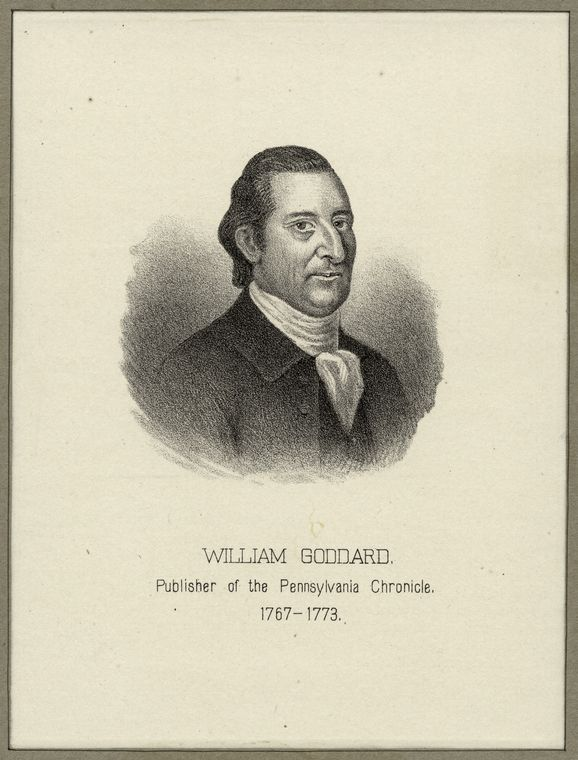
William Goddard, founder of the Pennsylvania Chronicle

In the first three years of the Chronicle's publication the newspaper was politically moderate in its tone. During this time Joseph Galloway and Thomas Wharton were Goddard's silent partners, but after their retirement in 1770, Goddard's newspaper became more sympathetic with the radical element and the push for American independence.

The Chronicle became a primary means in voicing the anti-British sentiment that was rapidly spreading throughout the colonies prior to the American Revolution. The paper gained much notoriety when Goddard printed an article voicing his support for the Boston Tea Party.

The paper's sympathies and general revolutionary message were a cause of great concern to the British. Soon the newspaper was heavily taxed for its delivery by the Crown Post (the colonial mail system in use at the time), and later the Crown Post simply refused to deliver the publication. The Crown Post finally drove the newspaper out of business in 1773. This prompted Goddard and Benjamin Franklin to establish an alternative mail system independent of the Crown Post authorities. This alternative system ultimately became the basis of a postal system that would later become the US Post Office.

=== Dickinson's letters ===
From 1767 to 1768, the Pennsylvania Chronicle published a series of 12 essays called Letters from a Farmer in Pennsylvania to the Inhabitants of the British Colonies, by John Dickinson. In these letters, Dickinson asserted the political philosophy of John Locke as the moral basis of the objections to the excessive British taxation of the colonies. Dickinson in no uncertain terms urged the American colonists to oppose British actions by legal petition, then boycott, and finally, if need be, by force of arms.

=== Voice against the Stamp Act ===
The August 1, 1768, issue of the Pennsylvania Chronicle printed on the front page a four-column article of an address made at the State House (Independence Hall) against the Stamp Act, and other excessive tax laws passed without colonial representation in the British Parliament.

=== Support for Boston Tea Party ===
In 1773 the paper gained much notoriety when it featured an article chronicling the unfolding of the Boston Tea Party and voicing popular support for this rebellious and historic event.

=== Chronicle vindicates Franklin ===
While Benjamin Franklin was in London as agent for Pennsylvania he opposed the enactment of the Stamp Act in 1765. Although he knew passage of the bill was inevitable he went along with the measure while actually working for its repeal. The people of Pennsylvania however suspected Franklin of duplicity. To offset malicious partisan speculations and attacks over Franklin's involvement in the passage of the Stamp Act William Goddard reprinted almost the entire collection of Franklin essays from London papers in the Pennsylvania Chronicle which summarized Franklin's involvement and underlying opposition to the passage of this act.

== See also ==
- The Constitutional Post
- Bibliography of Benjamin Franklin
- Bibliography of Thomas Jefferson

== Bibliography ==
- Crane, Verner W., Ph.D. (March 1942). "Franklin's Political Journalism in England" (PDF). 233 (3). University of Michigan.
- Lincoln, Charles Henry (1901). The revolutionary movement in Pennsylvania 1760-1776. University of Pennsylvania Press.
- Isaacson, Walter (2003). Benjamin Franklin: An American Life. New York: Simon & Schuster. ISBN 978-0-7432-5807-4.
- Zimmerman, John J. (1957). "Benjamin Franklin and the Pennsylvania Chronicle". The Pennsylvania Magazine of History and Biography. 81 (4). The Historical Society of Pennsylvania: 351–364. JSTOR 20089013.
