= Edward Langworthy (Founding Father) =

American Founding Father and politician

Delegate from Georgia to the Continental Congress
- In office 1777–1779

Secretary, Georgia Council of Safety
- In office December 11, 1775 – 1777

Clerk of Customs, Baltimore
- In office 1795–1802

Personal details
- Born: 1738 Savannah, Province of Georgia, British America
- Died: November 2, 1802 (aged 63–64) Baltimore, Maryland, U.S.
- Resting place: Old Episcopal Church Cemetery (later removed)
- Profession: Educator, politician, journalist

Edward Langworthy (1738–1802) was an American Founding Father and teacher who was a delegate to the Continental Congress from Georgia. He signed the Articles of Confederation.

Langworthy was born in Savannah, Georgia, in 1738. Nothing is known of his ancestors since he was a foundling. He was raised in the Bethesda Orphan House in Savannah and was educated in the school there. He later taught in that same school. Since he was born five years after James Oglethorpe shipped the first colonists to Georgia, his parents were likely included with those recruited from debtors' prisons or poorhouses.

Langworthy began working with Georgia's Committee of Safety and was their secretary when they became a revolutionary Council of Safety on December 11, 1775. The Georgia assembly sent him to the Continental Congress in 1777, and he arrived in time to sign the Articles of Confederation. He served in the Congress until 1779.

Edward moved to Baltimore, Maryland, in 1785. He married a young lady named Wright, and the couple had four children. He also bought a part interest in a newspaper The Maryland Journal & Baltimore Advertiser and became its editor. In 1787, he sold his interest and became an instructor at the Baltimore Academy.

In 1795, Langworthy was made the clerk of customs for Baltimore, a post he held until his death. He died of yellow fever on November 2, 1802, and was buried at the Old Episcopal Church. The church was torn down in 1891, and details of any re-interment are unknown.
