= Mary Katharine Goddard =

American publisher and postmaster (1738–1816)

- Born: June 16, 1738; Connecticut
- Died: August 12, 1816 (aged 78)
- Occupations: Postmaster, publisher, book seller
- Known for: First to print the United States Declaration of Independence with the names of the signatories.
- Notable work: The Goddard Broadside
- Parents: Dr. Giles Goddard; Sarah Updike Goddard
- Relatives: William Goddard (brother)

Mary Katharine Goddard (June 16, 1738 – August 12, 1816) was an early American publisher, and the postmaster of the Baltimore Post Office from 1775 to 1789. She was the older sister of William Goddard, also a publisher and printer. She was the second printer to print the Declaration of Independence. Her copy, the Goddard Broadside, was commissioned by Congress in 1777, and was the first to include the names of the signatories. In 1998, Goddard was inducted into the Maryland Women's Hall of Fame. Goddard owned a slave named Belinda Starling. Upon her death in 1816, Goddard's will posthumously freed Starling and left all of her property to her.

== Early life ==
Mary Katharine Goddard was born in southern New England in 1738. She was the daughter of Dr. Giles Goddard and Sarah Updike Goddard. Her father was the postmaster of New London, Connecticut. Goddard was taught reading and math by her mother. Her brother, William Goddard (1740–1817), was a few years younger and served an apprenticeship in the printing trade.

== Printing career ==
The Goddard family (Sarah, William and Mary) set up a printing business and were the first to publish a newspaper, The Providence Gazette, in Providence, Rhode Island.

William was the publisher and printer of a revolutionary publication, the Maryland Journal; however, William then left Rhode Island to start a newspaper in Philadelphia. Mary took over control of the journal in 1774, while her brother was traveling to promote his Constitutional Post, and she continued to publish it throughout the American Revolutionary War until 1784, when her brother forced her to give up the newspaper.

In 1775, Mary became postmaster of the Baltimore post office. She also ran a book store and published an almanac in offices located around 250 Market Street (now East Baltimore Street, near South Street).

After taking over the Maryland Journal, Mary was very active in the American Revolution, on the side of the colonial revolutionaries, via her publications. She reprinted Thomas Paine's Common Sense in her publication, and wrote and printed editorials speaking out against British brutality. Additionally, Mary released publications about the Battle of Bunker Hill and Congress's call to arms.

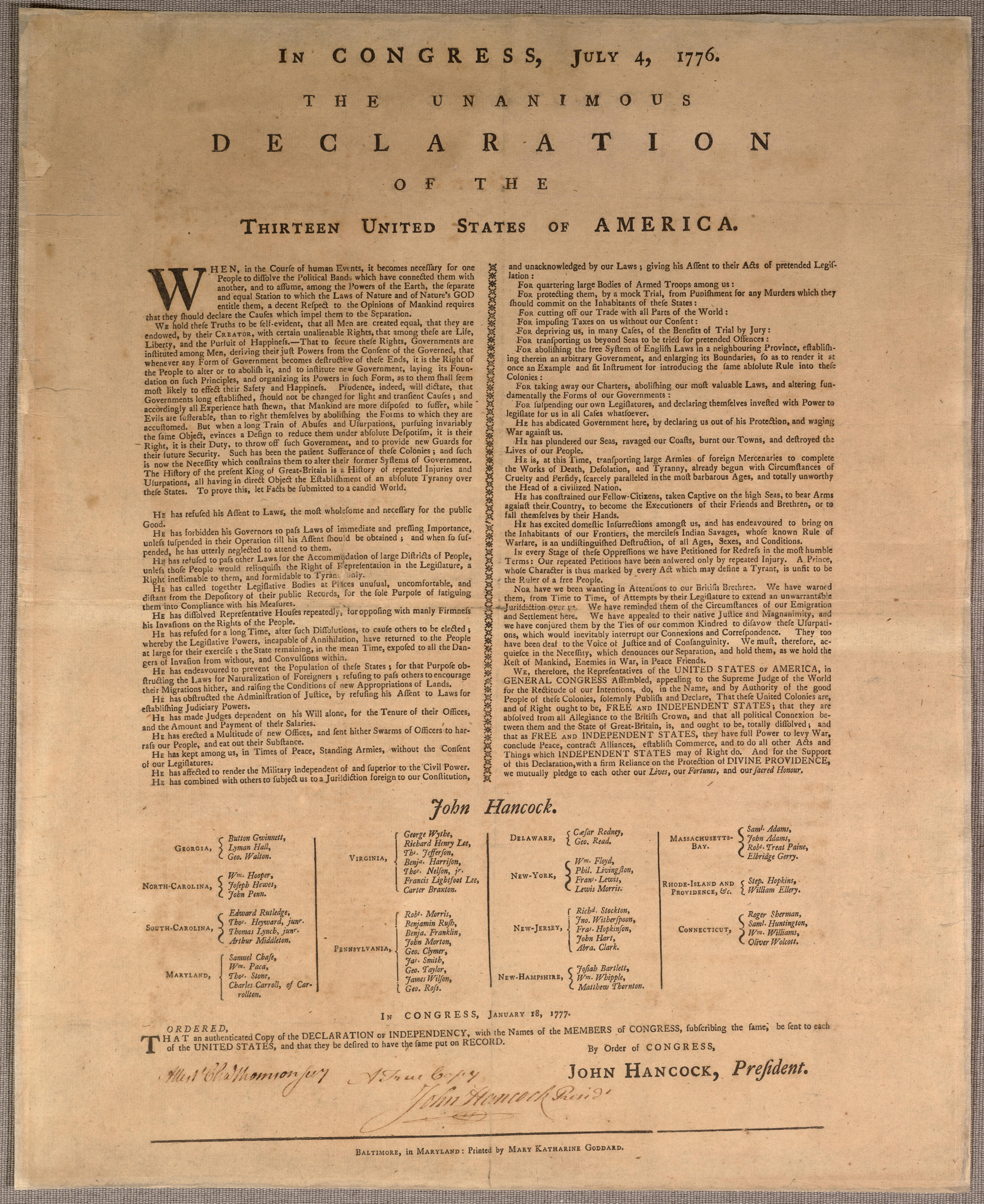
Goddard Broadside of the Declaration of Independence, with "Printed by Mary Katharine Goddard" at bottom

During the Revolution, Mary Goddard vehemently opposed the Stamp Act because it would increase the cost of publications.

When, on January 18, 1777, the Second Continental Congress moved that the Declaration of Independence be widely distributed, Goddard was one of the first to offer the use of her press. This was in spite of the risks of being associated with what was considered a treasonous document by the British. Her copy, the Goddard Broadside, was the second to be printed, and the first to contain the typeset names of the signatories, including John Hancock. The names of secretary Charles Thomson and president John Hancock of the Continental Congress were the only two that were on earlier printed copies. Goddard also signed her name on the bottom of the document. It reads “Baltimore, in Maryland: Printed by Mary Katharine Goddard.” About 2 years earlier, she had started printing her name on the bottom of her newspaper. However, those she signed with “Published by M.K. Goddard" instead of her full name.

== Postmaster ==
Goddard was a successful postmaster for 14 years, from 1775 to 1789. In 1789, however, she was fired by Postmaster General Samuel Osgood despite general protest from the Baltimore community. Osgood claimed that the position required "more traveling ... than a woman could undertake" and appointed a political ally of his to replace her. On November 12, 1789, over 230 citizens of Baltimore, including more than 200 leading businessmen, presented a petition demanding her reinstatement, but this was unsuccessful.

== Later life ==
Goddard remained in Baltimore after her dismissal as Postmaster. She continued to run, until 1809 or 1810, a bookshop that had previously been an adjunct to her printing business, and sold books, stationery, and dry goods. Goddard died August 12, 1816, still beloved by her community, and was buried in the graveyard of the St. Paul's Parish.

She posthumously freed her slave, Belinda Starling, in her will, wherein she wrote that she, "give[s] and grant[s] to my female slave, Belinda Starling, aged about 26 years, her Freedom at my death; and I also give and bequeath unto said Belinda Starling all the property of which I may did possessed; all which I do to recompense the faithful performance of duties to me."

== See also ==
- List of women printers and publishers before 1800
- Pennsylvania Chronicle
- William Goddard (printer)
