= James Parker (publisher) =

Colonial American printer (1714–1770)

- Born: 1714; Woodbridge, New Jersey
- Died: 1770 (aged 55–56); Burlington, New Jersey
- Burial place: First Presbyterian Churchyard; Woodbridge, New Jersey
- Other names: First Native New Jersey Printer; King's Printer
- Occupations: Colonial printer, journalist, librarian, postmaster
- Years active: 1727-1765
- Era: British Tax Resistance; Crown Royal Colony Governors; Loyalism
- Employer(s): Apprentice and indenture servant of William Bradford (1727)
- Known for: New Jersey General Assembly first printer publisher; King of England and New York province official printer publisher; Business associate of Benjamin Franklin; Postmaster with John Holt
- Notable work: New-York Weekly Post-Boy (1743); New-York Gazette, Revived in the Weekly Post-Boy (1744); Yale College printer publisher (1755); The Constitutional Courant (1765)
- Spouse: Madam Mary Ballareau
- Children: Samuel Franklin Parker (1745–1779); Jane Ballareau Parker (1746–1831)
- Parents: Samuel Parker (1674–1725); Jana Inglis Parker (1674–1744)
- Relatives: Grandparents: Elisha Parker (Barnstable, Massachusetts); Elizabeth Hinckley (Plymouth Colony); Governor of Plymouth: Thomas Hinckley
- Family: Samuel Parker (1712–1732)

James Parker (1714–1770) was a Colonial printer and publisher in British America during the reign of George II of Great Britain. Parker was born in 1714 at Woodbridge Township, New Jersey, the son of Samuel Parker and Jana Inglis Parker. Parker had a brother named Samuel, who died at 20 and was buried at the First Presbyterian Churchyard in Woodbridge Township.

James Parker had a son Samuel Franklin Parker who acquired the Franklin name given his business association and friendship with Benjamin Franklin. Samuel Franklin pursued his father's typesetting talents of an 18th century publisher printer during the governance of the Colonial government in the Thirteen Colonies. Parker had a daughter Jane Ballareau Parker who married Gunning Bedford Jr., a Founding Father of the United States and a signer of the United States Constitution.

== Colonial Currency in Province of New Jersey ==
In 1760s, the Woodbridge Township press governed the printing of colonial currency for the crown colony of New Jersey. The Province of New Jersey issued paper money depicting the unit of account for colonial currency reciprocal of the Carolingian monetary system.

Colonial Currency from James Parker Press

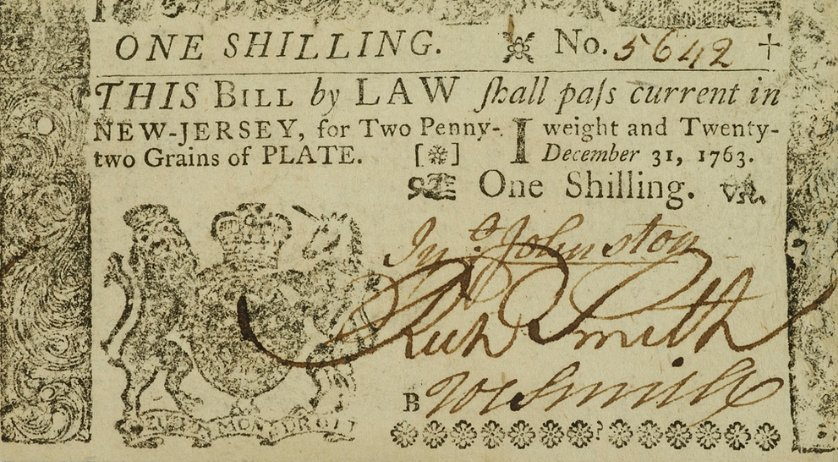
Province of New Jersey paper currency adorned with Coat of arms of Great Britain ca. 1763

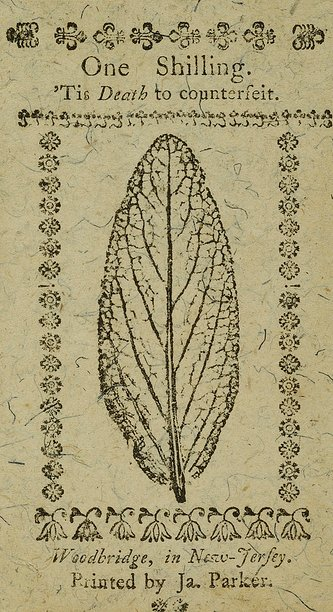
Province of New Jersey paper currency embellished with anti-counterfeiting impression resembling a tobacco leaf ca. 1763

In 1751, the British Parliament imposed regulatory law by enacting the Paper Bills of Credit Act. The parliamentary rules served as a currency reform for capital exchange and public banks established in British America.

== Parliamentary Taxation and Thirteen Colonies ==
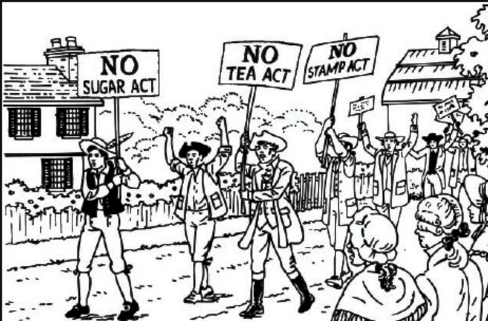
British America colonists protesting Great Britain taxation laws

In January of 1766, the Parliament of the United Kingdom assembled the Committee of the Whole House to examine the consequences of parliamentary taxation and repugnance by the British America's colonies regarding the Stamp Act 1765 and Declaratory Act 1766. During March 1766, Benjamin Franklin writes correspondence to Joseph Fox which allegedly is the first disclosure of the Declaratory Act (6 Geo. III, c. 12) in the English colonies.

Benjamin Franklin served as a colonial agent for the Pennsylvania Assembly and London associate as a Fellow of the Royal Society. Franklin represented the British North America interest and colonial governance in London from 1757 to 1775. In 1766, Franklin conveyed a consensus concerning the Stamp Act Congress deliberations in regards to the taxation ― Molasses Act and Sugar Act ― imposed on the British America colonies. The parliamentary chamber convened at the Palace of Westminster conducting a redress which became known as the Examination before the Committee of the Whole of the House of Commons disclosed February 13, 1766.

The Woodbridge Township press published pamphlets disseminated throughout the British America colonies with publications appearing in English language and foreign translations in Europe.

== See also ==
- Alexander Colden
- Alexander Wedderburn, 1st Earl of Rosslyn
- Considerations on Imposing Taxes in British Colonies
- Early American publishers and printers
- Ephemera
- Frederick North, Lord North
- Global spread of the printing press
- History of American newspapers
- Hutchinson letters affair
- Papermaking
- Postage stamps and postal history of the United States
- Seven Years' War
- Sons of Liberty
- Townshend Acts

== Franklin Papers Archives regarding James Parker in British America ==
- Franklin, Benjamin (February 20, 1742). "Articles of Agreement with James Parker, 20 February 1742". Founders Online. U.S. National Archives and Records Administration.
- Parker, James (September 7, 1747). "To Benjamin Franklin from James Parker, 7 September 1747". Founders Online. U.S. National Archives and Records Administration.
- Parker, James (September 21, 1747). "To Benjamin Franklin from James Parker, 21 September 1747". Founders Online. U.S. National Archives and Records Administration.
- Franklin, Benjamin (March 20, 1751). "From Benjamin Franklin to James Parker, 20 March 1751". Founders Online. U.S. National Archives and Records Administration.
- Franklin, Benjamin (May 8, 1754). "From Benjamin Franklin to Richard Partridge, 8 May 1754". Founders Online. U.S. National Archives and Records Administration.
- Colden, Alexander (July 28, 1755). "Alexander Colden to James Parker, 28 July 1755". Founders Online. U.S. National Archives and Records Administration.
- Franklin, Benjamin; Hunter, William (April 22, 1757). "Commission to James Parker as Comptroller of the Post Office, 22 April 1757". Founders Online. U.S. National Archives and Records Administration.
- Parker, James (November 15, 1763). "To Benjamin Franklin from James Parker: Bond, 15 November 1763". Founders Online. U.S. National Archives and Records Administration.
- Franklin, Benjamin; Foxcroft, John (July 10, 1764). "Benjamin Franklin and John Foxcroft: Commission to James Parker, 10 July 1764". Founders Online. U.S. National Archives and Records Administration.
- Parker, James (October 27, 1764). "To Benjamin Franklin from James Parker, 27 October 1764". Founders Online. U.S. National Archives and Records Administration.
- Franklin, Benjamin (November 5, 1764). "Power of Attorney to James Parker, 5 November 1764". Founders Online. U.S. National Archives and Records Administration.
- Parker, James (November 23, 1764). "To Benjamin Franklin from James Parker, 23 November 1764". Founders Online. U.S. National Archives and Records Administration.
- Parker, James (January 14, 1765). "To Benjamin Franklin from James Parker, 14 January 1765". Founders Online. U.S. National Archives and Records Administration.
- Parker, James (January 22, 1765). "To Benjamin Franklin from James Parker, 22 January 1765". Founders Online. U.S. National Archives and Records Administration.
- Parker, James (March 22, 1765). "To Benjamin Franklin from James Parker, 22 March 1765". Founders Online. U.S. National Archives and Records Administration.
- Parker, James (April 25, 1765). "To Benjamin Franklin from James Parker, 25 April 1765". Founders Online. U.S. National Archives and Records Administration.
- Parker, James (August 8, 1765). "To Benjamin Franklin from James Parker, 8 August 1765". Founders Online. U.S. National Archives and Records Administration.
- Parker, James (December 20, 1765). "To Benjamin Franklin from James Parker, 20 December 1765". Founders Online. U.S. National Archives and Records Administration.
- Parker, James (January 27, 1766). "James Parker: Valuation of the Printing Office, 27 January 1766". Founders Online. U.S. National Archives and Records Administration.
- Parker, James (February 1, 1766). "James Parker: Final Report on the Franklin and Hall Accounts, 1 February 1766". Founders Online. U.S. National Archives and Records Administration.
- Franklin, Benjamin (February 13, 1766). "Examination before the Committee of the Whole of the House of Commons, 13 February 1766". Founders Online. U.S. National Archives and Records Administration.
- Parker, James (May 6, 1766). "To Benjamin Franklin from James Parker, 6 May 1766". Founders Online. U.S. National Archives and Records Administration.
- Parker, James (June 11, 1766). "To Benjamin Franklin from James Parker, 11 June 1766". Founders Online. U.S. National Archives and Records Administration.
- Parker, James (July 1, 1766). "To Benjamin Franklin from James Parker, 1 July 1766". Founders Online. U.S. National Archives and Records Administration.
- Parker, James (October 25, 1766). "To Benjamin Franklin from James Parker, 25 October 1766". Founders Online. U.S. National Archives and Records Administration.
- Parker, James (November 11, 1766). "To Benjamin Franklin from James Parker, 11 November 1766". Founders Online. U.S. National Archives and Records Administration.
- Parker, James (January 21, 1768). "To Benjamin Franklin from James Parker, 21 January 1768". Founders Online. U.S. National Archives and Records Administration.

== Bibliography ==
- Parker, James (1755). "Family-Religion Revived, or, An Attempt to Promote Religion and Virtue in Families: In Two Parts". Internet Archive. New Haven, Connecticut: Parker, James, 1714–1770, Printer. OCLC 54972886.
- Parker, James (1764). "Conductor Generalis, or, The Office, Duty and Authority of Justices of the Peace, High-Sheriffs, Under-Sheriffs, Coroners, Constables, Gaolers, Jury-Men, and Overseers of the Poor: as also, the Office of Clerks of Assize, and of the Peace". HathiTrust Digital Library. Woodbridge, New Jersey: Parker, James, 1714–1770. OCLC 8329646.
- "No stamped paper to be had" [November 7, 1765, Issue No. 1924, of The Pennsylvania Gazette, printed at Philadelphia]. David Hall & Benjamin Franklin. 1765. LCCN 98160405.
- Thomas, Isaiah (1810). "James Parker and Company" [The History of Printing in America: with a Biography of Printers, and an Account of Newspapers]. HathiTrust Digital Library. Worcester, Massachusetts: Isaiah Thomas Press. pp. 410–411. OCLC 1917653.
- Munsell, Joel (1870). "A Chronology of Paper and Paper-making". HathiTrust Digital Library. Albany, New York: J. Munsell. LCCN 10000968. OCLC 1158638.
- Munsell, Joel (1876). "Chronology of the Origin and Progress of Paper and Paper-making". HathiTrust Digital Library. Albany, New York: J. Munsell. LCCN 09018808. OCLC 2637748.
- Parker, Samuel Eugene (July 1899). "James Parker, Printer to the King's Most Excellent Majesty for the Province Nova-Caesaria, or New Jersey". New York Genealogical and Biographical Record. 30 (3). New York City, New York: New York Genealogical and Biographical Society: 176–177. OCLC 563781666 – via HathiTrust Digital Library.
- Hull, Charles Henry; Temperley, Harold William Vazeille (April 1912). "Debates on the Declaratory act and the repeal of the Stamp Act, 1766". The American Historical Review. XVII (3). Oxford University Press. LCCN 18019948 – via United States Library of Congress.
- "Parker, James, 1714-1770" [Sarah Cresson Transcriptions of James Parker Letters and Documents circa 1916] (PDF). HSP.org. The Historical Society of Pennsylvania. 2010-04-08.
- Weeks, Lyman Horace (1916). "A History of Paper-Manufacturing in the United States, 1690-1916". HathiTrust Digital Library. New York, New York: The Lockwood Trade Journal Company. LCCN 17012277. OCLC 566946.
- Benedict, William H. (1923). "James Parker, The Printer, of Woodbridge". Proceedings of the New Jersey Historical Society: A Magazine of History, Biography and Notes on Families. 8. Edison, New Jersey: New Jersey Historical Society: 194–199. OCLC 558480381 – via HathiTrust Digital Library.
- Hunter, Dard (1930). "Papermaking through Eighteen Centuries". HathiTrust Digital Library. New York, New York: House of William Edwin Rudge. LCCN 30014991. OCLC 1466921.
- Currey, Cecil B (1968). Road to Revolution: Benjamin Franklin in England 1765-1775. Garden City, New York: Anchor Books. ISBN 978-0844619316. OCLC 424715.
- Dyer, Alan (1982). A Biography of James Parker, Colonial Printer. Troy, New York: Whitston Publishing Company. ISBN 978-0878752027. OCLC 8374399.
- Frasca, Ralph (April 1990). "From Apprentice to Journeyman to Partner: Benjamin Franklin's Workers and the Growth of the Early American Printing Trade". The Pennsylvania Magazine of History and Biography. 114 (2). University of Pennsylvania Press: 229–248. JSTOR 20092470.
- "British Reforms and Colonial Resistance, 1763-1766". U.S. History Timeline ~ The American Revolution, 1763 - 1783. United States Library of Congress.
- "British Reforms and Colonial Resistance, 1767-1772". U.S. History Timeline ~ The American Revolution, 1763 - 1783. United States Library of Congress.
- "Parker, James, 1714-1770". Library of Congress Authorities. United States Library of Congress. LCCN n82083599.
