= Sarah Updike Goddard =

American printer and newspaper publisher

Sarah Goddard
- Born: Sarah Updike c. 1701; Coscumcussoc, Narragansett, Colony of Rhode Island and Providence Plantations
- Died: 1770 (aged 68–69); Philadelphia, Province of Pennsylvania
- Occupation: Printer
- Known for: Printing the first newspaper in Providence, the Providence Gazette and Country Journal
- Notable work: Providence Gazette and Country Journal

Sarah Updike Goddard (c. 1701 – January 5, 1770) was an early American printer, as well as a co-founder and publisher of the Providence Gazette and Country Journal, the first newspaper founded in Providence, Rhode Island. She worked closely with her son William and daughter Mary Katherine, who both also became printers and publishers, forming one of the earliest influential publishing dynasties in the American colonies.

== Early years and education ==
Sarah Updike was born at Cocumscussuc, Rhode Island, just north of the village of Wickford, where her parents, Lodowick Updike (anglicized from Opdyck) and Abigail (Newton) Updike, had inherited Smith's Castle, the original site of Roger Williams' trading post. Sarah was one of six children; her brother Daniel would go on to serve as attorney general of the Colony of Rhode Island and Providence Plantations.

She was well educated, studying French and Latin in addition to more usual subjects.

== Career ==
In 1735, she married Giles Goddard, a well-to-do physician, and they settled in New London, Connecticut. Giles Goddard was also the postmaster in New London, and when he fell ill in 1755, Sarah served as postmaster in his place. Both of their surviving children — Mary Katherine and William — became involved in the printing and publishing businesses.

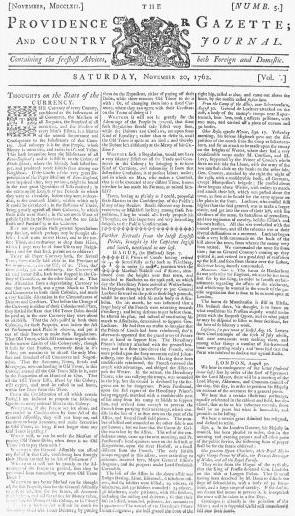
Providence Gazette and Country Journal of Nov. 20, 1762.

Sometime after Giles's death in 1757, Sarah moved to Providence, Rhode Island, where in 1762 she financed her son William to set up Providence's first print shop and an associated weekly newspaper, the Providence Gazette and Country Journal. Both Sarah and her daughter Mary Katherine worked in the shop and developed into accomplished printers alongside head printer John Carter, who had apprenticed with Benjamin Franklin.

In 1765, due to a lack of subscribers, William suspended publication of the Providence Gazette and moved away. Sarah took over management of the print shop with the help of Mary Katherine and issued broadsides and pamphlets as well as the annual West's Almanack under the imprint "S. & W. Goddard". In 1766, she revived the Providence Gazette with "Sarah Goddard & Company" as the publisher. That same year, she printed the first American edition of the letters of the essayist and poet Lady Mary Wortley Montagu. She added a bookstore and bindery to her operation before selling the business in 1768 to John Carter.

Goddard and Mary Katherine then moved to Philadelphia, where William had launched a new paper, the Pennsylvania Chronicle and Universal Advertiser. This paper had run into trouble due to William's erratic management and many absences. Goddard took over management of the paper and provided financial support, which allowed the Chronicle to survive. However, she died within a year of the move, leaving her daughter as the paper's manager.

A contemporary obituary praised Goddard for her "uncommon attainments in literature" and her "sensible and edifying conversation".

In 1998, Goddard was inducted into the Rhode Island Heritage Hall of Fame.
