= Bartholomew Green Sr. =

Early American publisher

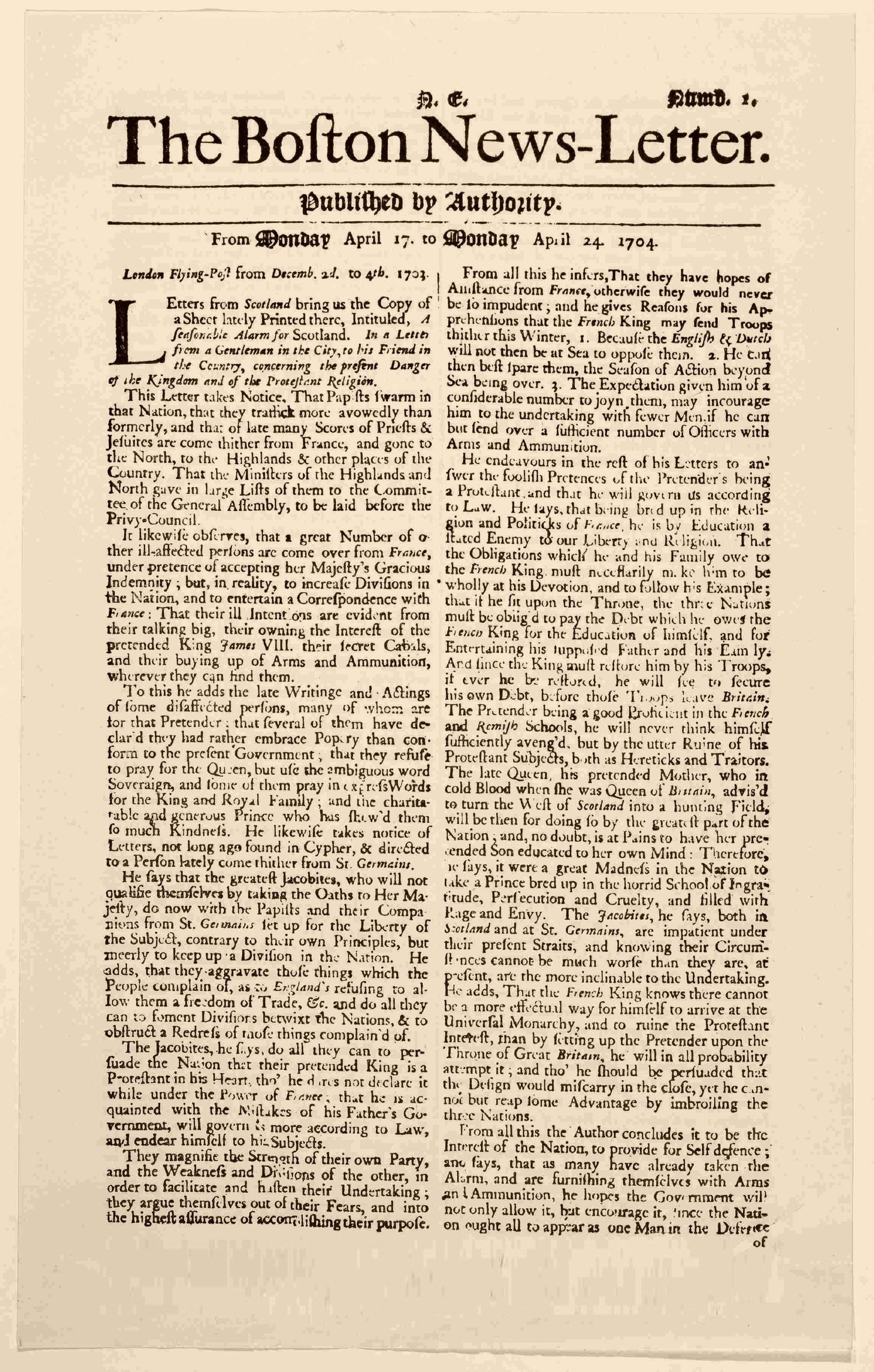
Boston News-Letter, 1704, printed by Bartholomew Green.

Bartholomew Green (October 12, 1666 – December 28, 1732) was a colonial printer at Boston and later the publisher of The Boston News-Letter.

== Early life and family ==
Bartholomew Green was born in Cambridge, Massachusetts Bay Colony. He was the eldest son of Samuel Green, an accomplished colonial printer who arrived with his wife Elizabeth in the young Massachusetts Bay colony at Cambridge at the age of sixteen years of age, with their children and other relatives, along with Governor Winthrop. His son, Bartholomew Green, Jr. apprenticed with his father until he went on his own in 1725 and began printing The Boston Gazette, a rival newspaper to his father's Boston News-Letter.

Bartholomew was the eldest son of Samuel Green, printer to Cambridge University, where the Greens had resided since 1649, and where Samuel Green, along with Marmaduke Johnson printed the Eliot Indian Bible, the first Bible in America, not in English, but in the Algonquin-Massachusett Indian language.

In 1690 he removed to Boston, and established his printing house. That year his house and printing wares were destroyed by fire and was subsequently compelled to return to Cambridge and resume work in his father's printing house.

Green was one of the deacons of the Old South Church in Boston.

== Career ==
Green served for his father and assisted his half-brother Samuel when the latter managed Sewall's press in Boston after 1682. When Sewall's license expired in 1684, the Greens continued to print, and on Bartholomew's brother's death, in July 1690, he assumed charge.

The Boston News-Letter is regarded as the first continuously published newspaper in British North America. Initially, it was heavily subsidized by the British government, with a limited circulation. The Boston News-Letter’s first editor was John Campbell.

In 1722 the editorship passed to Green, the paper's printer. Green changed the focus of the newspaper to place more emphasis on domestic events.

During his career, he took on Samuel Kneeland as an apprentice.

After his death in 1732 his son John Draper, also a printer, took the paper's helm, who upon his death left it to his son, Richard Draper. He enlarged the paper to four pages and filled it with news from throughout the colonies. He also had a son, Bartholomew, who was a successful printer.

== Published by Green ==
- Benjamin Colman's Some observations on the new method of receiving the small-pox by ingrafting or inoculating (1721)
- Cotton Mather's A vindication of the ministers of Boston: from the abuses & scandals, lately cast upon them, in diverse printed papers (1722)
- The charter granted by Their Majesties King William and Queen Mary, to the inhabitants of the province of the Massachusetts-Bay in New-England. Boston in New-England: Printed by B. Green, printer to the Honorable the lieut. governor & Council, for Benjamin Eliot, and sold at his shop near the Town-House in King's Street, 1726.

== See also ==
- Bibliography of early American publishers and printers

== Bibliography ==
- Ellis, Harold M. (1915). Joseph Dennie and His Circle: A Study in American Literature from 1792-1812. University of Texas Press.
- Hudson, Frederic (1873). Journalism in the United States, from 1690 to 1872. New York, Harper & Brothers.
- Thomas, Isaiah (1874). The history of printing in America, with a biography of printers. Vol. I. New York, B. Franklin.
- Weeks, Lyman Horace; Bacon, Edwin Munroe (1911). An historical digest of the provincial press. Boston, Society for americana.
