= Samuel Green (printer) =

Colonial American printer (1615–1702)

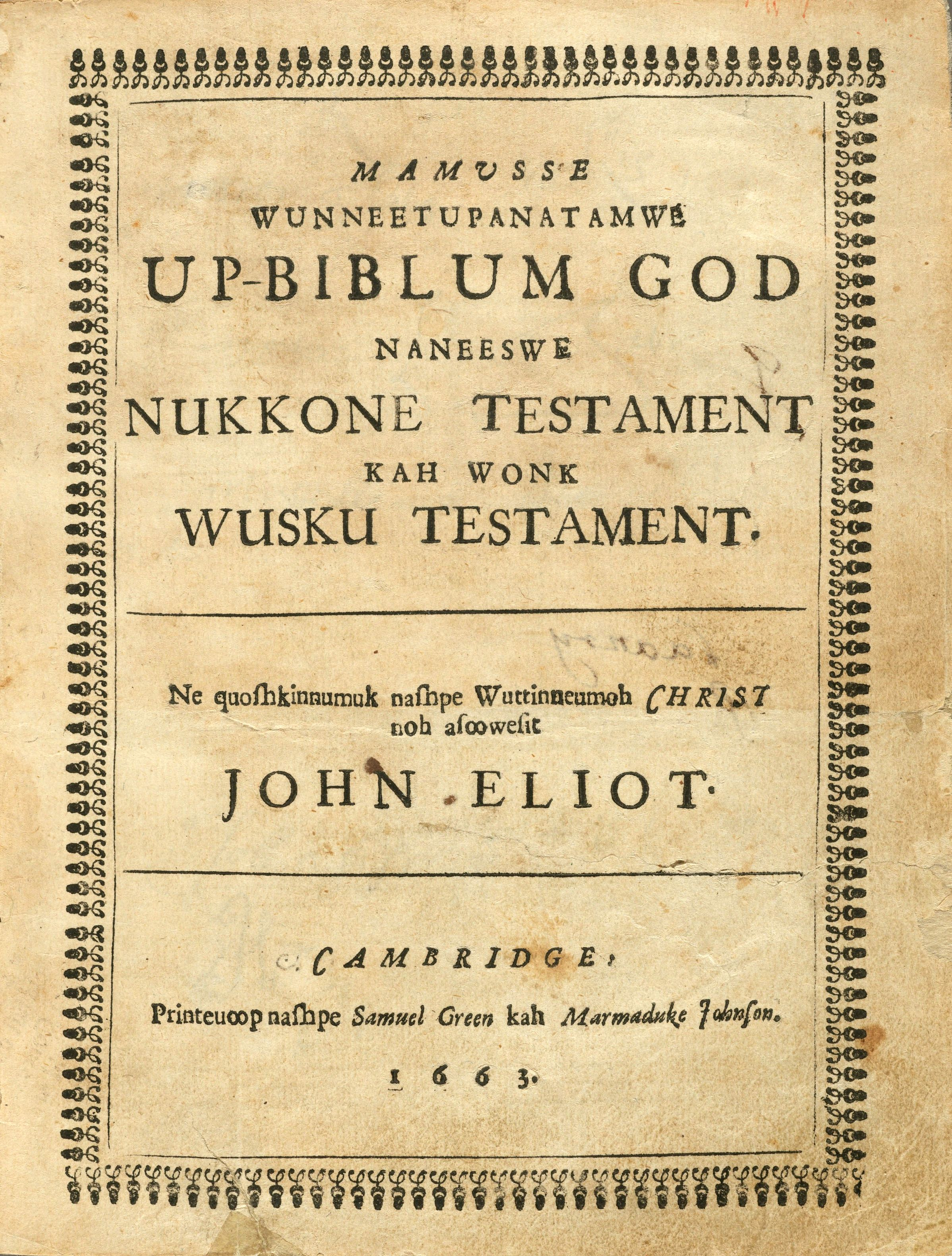
The Holy Bible Containing the Old and New Testaments, translated into the Massachusetts Indian Language. Printed by Samuel Green and Marmaduke Johnson, Cambridge, Massachusetts, 1663

Samuel Green (1615 – January 1, 1702) was an early American printer, the first of several printers from the Green family who followed in his footsteps. One of Green's major accomplishments as a printer was the Eliot Indian Bible, translated by the missionary John Eliot, typeset by James Printer, which became the first Bible to be printed in British America in 1663. Members of his family who also became printers include his sons Bartholomew, Bartholomew Green Jr. and Joseph Dennie. Throughout his adult life Green also served in the Massachusetts Bay Colonial Militia, advancing to the rank of captain later in life.

== Early life and family ==
Green was born in England, the son of Bartholomew and Elizabeth. Green emigrated to the American colonies about 1633 aboard the Arbella, and settled in Cambridge, Massachusetts, arriving with John Winthrop, one of the leading men involved in establishing Massachusetts Bay Colony.

Green married twice, the marriages of which produced nineteen children. Some of his sons also became printers, working in Connecticut, Maryland, Pennsylvania and Nova Scotia, among other places. His first wife, was Jane Banbridge, who died on November 16, 1657, after which on February 23, 1662, he married Sarah Clark (1644-1707). Green had a daughter, Elizabeth, who became involved with Marmaduke Johnson, sent over from England to assist him in his printing business, but when Johnson, who had a wife back in England, proposed to her, without Green's consent, it put a serious strain on their business relationship, though they still managed, however, to work well together.

Samuel Green was a progenitor of the Green family of printers. His son, Samuel Jr., was from his first wife. Samuel's son from his second wife, Bartholomew Green Sr., (1666–1732) was a printer, and his son, Bartholomew Green Jr. was the printer of The Boston News-Letter. Timothy Green was the son of Samuel Green Jr., who was also a printer in Boston who produced works for booksellers. Samuel's great-grandson was Timothy Green. Timothy had a son, Jonas Green, who settled at New London in 1714.

== Printing career ==
Green was among the first printers to emerge in the American colonies. He arrived in Cambridge some eight years before Elizabeth Glover, who brought over America's first printing press from England with her husband Joseph, who died on the voyage. No records of Green's printing activity, however, are extant until ten years after Stephen Daye began operating the printing press in Glover's house in Cambridge. Green was also Cambridge's town clerk, and captain of the town militia.

When Daye finally retired Green took over as the manager of the Cambridge press, which President Henry Dunster of Harvard College (Note: Dunster (1609 -1658) was a Puritan clergyman and the first president of Harvard College.) had acquired. and held that office for approximately fifty years. Historian John W. Moore assumes that Green had learned the printing trade from observing Daye, if he hadn't already learned the trade while in England. By 1656 Green had two printing-presses operating at the Cambridge office. Dunster was forced to resign in 1654, (Note: Dunster didn't accept certain Puritan precepts and lost favor with leading Puritan leaders, forced to resign and exiled himself to Plymouth colony.) and Green sold his press to Harvard College, and around 1670 the Society's press was also placed its control. With some interruptions Green continued as the college printer. He was also printer for the Colony through 1691.

The colony of Connecticut commissioned Green in Cambridge to handle its official printing for many years, and later employed his sons Samuel and Bartholomew Green in Boston to oversee and complete the printing of their laws and other documents. In 1673 Samuel Green also made use of Greek and Hebrew letters with the Cambridge press in the printing of Urian Oakes's work, entitled New England Pleaded with. The occurrence of such type was rare in colonial printing houses.

Green, with the assistance of James the Printer and Marmaduke Johnson, was commissioned by the Commissioners of the United Colonies in New England in 1661 to print the Eliot Indian Bible, written by missionary John Eliot and consisting of the New and Old Testaments, translated from English to the Massachusett Indian language, which was typeset by Wawaus, alias James Printer, they completed in 1663 after two years labor. The work was printed with two title pages, with one in English and one in the Massachusett Indian language. The two testaments were then bound together making one complete Bible. A Catechism, and the Psalms of David in Indian verse were also attached to it. This became the first Bible in any language that was printed in America. (Note: The first Bible in the English language didn't appear in the American colonies until 1752, printed by Samuel Kneeland and Bartholomew Green Jr.)

A copy of the completed Indian Bible, bound in an elaborate leather cover, was presented to Charles the Second, which included a dedication of thanks and gratitude for his support, making possible the expensive task involved in the printing production. (Note: The funding required for the arduous task of translation and the printing was provided by a charter from the Society for the Propagation of the Gospel, which was renewed by Charles II.)

In 1662, Green, working with the assistance of James or sometimes Johnson, was paid on average of 60 shillings a sheet for printing forty-six sheets of the Eliot Indian Bible. Normally this would be considered a high rate to pay for such a production, however, as the pages were set in a nine-point type, in a double column format, in an Indian language that was completely unknown to Green or Johnson. Green first handled the binding of the Eliot Indian Bible's New Testament in 1661, but by 1663 he commissioned John Ratcliff of Boston to handle the binding of the whole Indian Bible.

During the printing production of the Indian Bible, Johnson, though considered a good worker, would sometimes take leave of absence for extended periods of time. Subsequently, as soon as Johnson's printing contract was completed in 1664 he was dismissed, and sent back to England. Upon his arrival there, however, he was appointed the official printer for the New England Company, (Note: Also known as Society for the Propagation of the Gospel in New England) replacing Green, which by some accounts was prompted by John Eliot's insistence. This course of events resulted in Green losing much of his income that he otherwise obtained from the sale of the Indian tracts.

Green also printed several editions of The Book of the General Lawes and Libertyes concerning the citizens of Massachusetts, along with several editions of the Bay Psalm Book, and several Indian books, which were among his primary works. The list of extant works produced by Green number approximately 275.

Other works printed by Green include:

- Mather, Richard, 1657. Farewell Exhortation to the Church and People of Dorchester in New England.
- Philomathemat, S. B., 1657. Almanac for 1657.
- Norton, John, 1657. The Life and Death of that deservedly Famous Mr. John Cotton, the late Reverend Teacher of the Church of Christ at Boston in New England.
- Peirson, Abraham, (Pastor) 1658. Some Helps for the Indians; shewing them how to improve their natural Reason, to know the true God, and the Christian Religion.
- Zech. Brigden, 1659. An Almanac of the Celestial Motions.
- Chauncy, Nathaniel, 1662. Almanac for 1662.
- Chauncy, Charles, 1662. Anti-Synodalia Scripta Americana; or, a Proposal of the Judgment of the Dissenting Messengers of the Churches of New England...
- Green's last imprint was Cotton Mather's, Ornaments for the Daughters of Zion, (1692)

Green also had considerable landholding in Massachusetts. Besides printing, another of his chief avocations, was serving in the Massachusetts Bay Colonial Militia where he was very active. He became a sergeant by 1653, but thereafter rose in rank slowly, and finally achieved the rank of captain in 1689 when he was seventy-five years of age, and he remained in that office for the rest of his days.

== See also ==
- Early American publishers and printers
- List of early American publishers and printers
- Samuel Hall (printer) — First printer to arrive in Salem, Massachusetts, 1668
- Robert Aitken (publisher) — Printed the first Bible in America in the English language in 1782
- Newspapers of colonial America

== Bibliography ==
- Adams, Nehemiah (1847). The life of John Eliot; with an account of the early missionary efforts among the Indians of New England. Boston, Massachusetts Sabbath School Society.
- Brackney, William H. (2006). Baptists in North America : an historical perspective. Malden, MA; Oxford : Blackwell Pub. ISBN 978-1-4051-1865-1.
- Byington, Ezra Hoyt (1899). The Puritan as a colonist and reformer. Boston, Little, Brown.
- Chaplin, Jeremiah (1872). Life of Henry Dunster : first president of Harvard College. Boston : J.R. Osgood.
- Convers, Francis (1844). Jared Sparks (ed.). Life of John Eliot, the apostle to the Indians. Vol. V. New York : Harper & Brothers.
- Duniway, Clyde Augustus (1906). The development of freedom of the press in Massachusetts. Vol. XII. New York, Longmans.
- Ellis, Milton (1915). Joseph Dennie and His Circle: A Study in American Literature From 1792-1812. Bulletin of the University of Texas. "Joseph Dennie and His Circle: A Study in American Literature From 1792-1812."
- Franklin, Benjamin V (1980). Boston printers, publishers, and booksellers, 1640-1800. Boston, Mass. : G.K. Hall. ISBN 9780816184729.
- Malone (1932). Dictionary of American biography. Vol. VII.
  New York: Charles Scribner's Sons.
- Moore, John Weeks (1886). Moore's Historical, Biographical, and Miscellaneous Gatherings: In the Form of Disconnected Notes Relative to Printers, Printing, Publishing, and Editing of Books, Newspapers ... Republican Press Association.
- Paige, Lucius Robinson (1877). History of Cambridge, Massachusetts, 1630-1877, with a genealogical register. Boston, Houghton.
- Round, Phillip H. (2010). Removable type : histories of the book in Indian country, 1663-1880. University of North Carolina Press. ISBN 978-0-8078-3390-2.
- Salisbury, Neal (January 1974). "Red Puritans: The "Praying Indians" of Massachusetts Bay and John Eliot". The William and Mary Quarterly. 30 (1). Omohundro Institute of Early American History and Culture: 27–54. doi:10.2307/1918981. JSTOR 1918981.
- Thomas, Isaiah (1874). The history of printing in America, with a biography of printers. Vol. I. New York: B. Franklin.
- —— (1874). The history of printing in America, with a biography of printers. Vol. II. New York, B. Franklin.
- Winship, George Parker (1945). The Cambridge Press 1638 1692. Philadelphia: University of Pennsylvania Press. Alternative printing
- Wroth, Lawrence C. (1938). The Colonial Printer. Portland, Me., The Southworth-Anthoensen press.
- "Library Receives Rare Eliot Bible". Georgetown University Library.
