= Marmaduke Johnson =

Colonial American printer (1628–1674)

- Born: 1628; Rothwell, West Riding of Yorkshire, England
- Died: December 25, 1674 (aged 46); Boston, Massachusetts
- Known for: First master printer in America, printed the Indian Bible in the Algonquin language

Signature
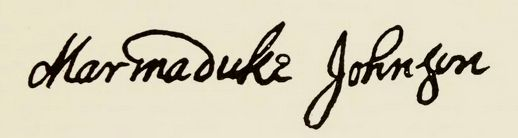

Marmaduke Johnson (1628 – December 25, 1674) was a London printer who was commissioned and sailed from England to Massachusetts Bay Colony in 1660 to assist Samuel Green in the printing of The Indian Bible, which had been laboriously translated by John Eliot into the Massachusett Indian language, which became the first Bible printed in America. Johnson printed several further works for Eliot containing religious material translated for the Indian nations of Massachusetts. Johnson was the first highly skilled letterpress printer in America. When he attempted to open his own printing house in Boston, without an official license from the Crown, the Massachusetts General Court interceded and censured his operation, disallowing printing outside of Cambridge. This started one of the first 'Freedom of the Press' disputes in colonial America. After several appeals the Court conceded and Johnson moved to Boston, set up and outfitted his printing shop, and became the first printer allowed to operate his own private printing press in the colony.

== Early years ==
Marmaduke Johnson was born in Rothwell, West Riding of Yorkshire, England, the son of a tailor. Beginning January 9, 1646, he served the customary seven years as an apprentice under John Field in London. He completed his apprenticeship on October 4, 1652. (Note: Field was the printer of the University of Cambridge.) Little else is known of his years in London, other than he was once served a term in jail for debt. He subsequently wrote the anonymous Ludgate, What It Is: Not What It Was, a critical essay condemning the British debtors' prison system, which was printed by his brother Thomas.

== Printing career ==
Johnson is widely noted for printing the Eliot Indian Bible with Samuel Green. in an attempt to teach Christianity to the Indian nations in Massachusetts. (Note: Green was the official printer for Harvard College and the Massachusetts General Court for forty-three years.) The project to print the Bible in the Algonquin-Massachusett language began with missionary John Eliot who came to the Massachusetts Bay Colony from England in 1631. One of his primary missions was to teach and convert the Massachusett to Christianity. (Note: For his prolonged effort Eliot was often referred to as "The Apostle to the Indians" by his contemporaries and some historians.) To effect this he studied the Algonquin Indian language and then, with the assistance of James Printer (Note: James Printer was an American Indian from the Nipmuc tribe who attended the Indian school at Cambridge, where he learned to read and write English. In 1659 he served as an apprentice under Samuel Green. John Elliot said of James that he was the only man “... able to compose the sheets and correct the press, with understanding.”) translated various Christian scriptures from English to the Massachusett Indian language, (Note: The Massachusett language is an Algonquian language of the Algic language family, once spoken by various tribes of eastern coastal and southeastern Massachusetts.) rather than trying to teach the Indians English and then have them study scriptures. This was an effort that took him fourteen years to complete before he took on the task of printing the translation of various Christian scriptures into Algonquin. He commissioned Green in the printing of the Gospel of Matthew, Book of Genesis, and Psalms, and presented these works to the corporation as examples of what a completed Algonquin Bible would look like.

The Corporation approved Elliot's work and in 1660 sent Marmaduke Johnson, an accomplished printer, to the American colonies on board the Prudent Mary and he arrived at Boston with a new printing press, one hundred reams of paper and eighty pounds of new type for the printing to assist Green in the translation and printing of the New and Old testaments of the Bible in an Algonquin Indian language. The agreement, outlining Johnson's terms of service and his duties as a printer, was drawn up and signed by Johnson on April 21, 1660. Thomas Bell (Note: Thomas Bell was a Puritan who emigrated from England to the Massachusetts Bay Colony to escape religious persecution in 1634.) of the Corporation paid Johnson £5 for his passage across the Atlantic, and 18 shillings for a rug, boulster and blanket for his accommodation during the voyage.

i.e." And shall serve the aid President and Society and their Successors in New England aforesaid in the Art of a printer for he printinge of the Bible in the Indian language and such other Books as he shall be directed to print for and duringe the terme of Three yeares". (Note: The entire text of The Articles of Agreement for Johnson can be found in the Records of the colony of New Plymouth, Vol. II.)

Johnson arrived in New England sometime during the summer of 1660 with another printing press to assist in the printing of Elliot's Indian Bible. Before Johnson's arrival Green had only managed to produce a few sheets of the New Testament. After Johnson's arrival both printing presses were now committed to the enormous task that lay before them. (Note: The task of translating and printing the Bible into an Indian language was the largest project ever completed on an American printing press until well into the eighteenth century, and was only rivaled by the production of second edition of the Eliot Indian Bible printed in 1680-1685.) By 1661, Johnson, Green, and with the assistance of John Eliot and James Printer in the translation of English to the Massachusett language, printed 1,500 copies of the New Testament. By 1663, Marmaduke and Green had printed 1,180 volumes of the Old and New Testaments translated from English to the Massachusett language. (Note: Only a few dozen of Eliot's 1663 Bible remain in existence, as most copies were destroyed during King Philip's War in 1675–1676.) The two books were bound together to make one complete Bible, to which were attached a Catechism, and the Psalms of David in Indian verse. This was the first Bible in any language that was printed in America. (Note: The first Bible in America in the English language wasn't printed until 1752, by Samuel Kneeland and Bartholomew Green Jr.) Thus completed, a copy of The Indian Bible, in elegant binding, was presented to Charles the Second, which included a dedication of thanks and gratitude for his support. (Note: The funding required for the effort involved in the translation and the printing was provided by a charter from the Society for the Propagation of the Gospel, which was renewed by Charles II. The text of the dedication can be read in Records of the colony of New Plymouth, in New England, Volume II, published 1855.)

Eliot Indian Bible
printed by Marmaduke Johnson & Samuel Green, 1663

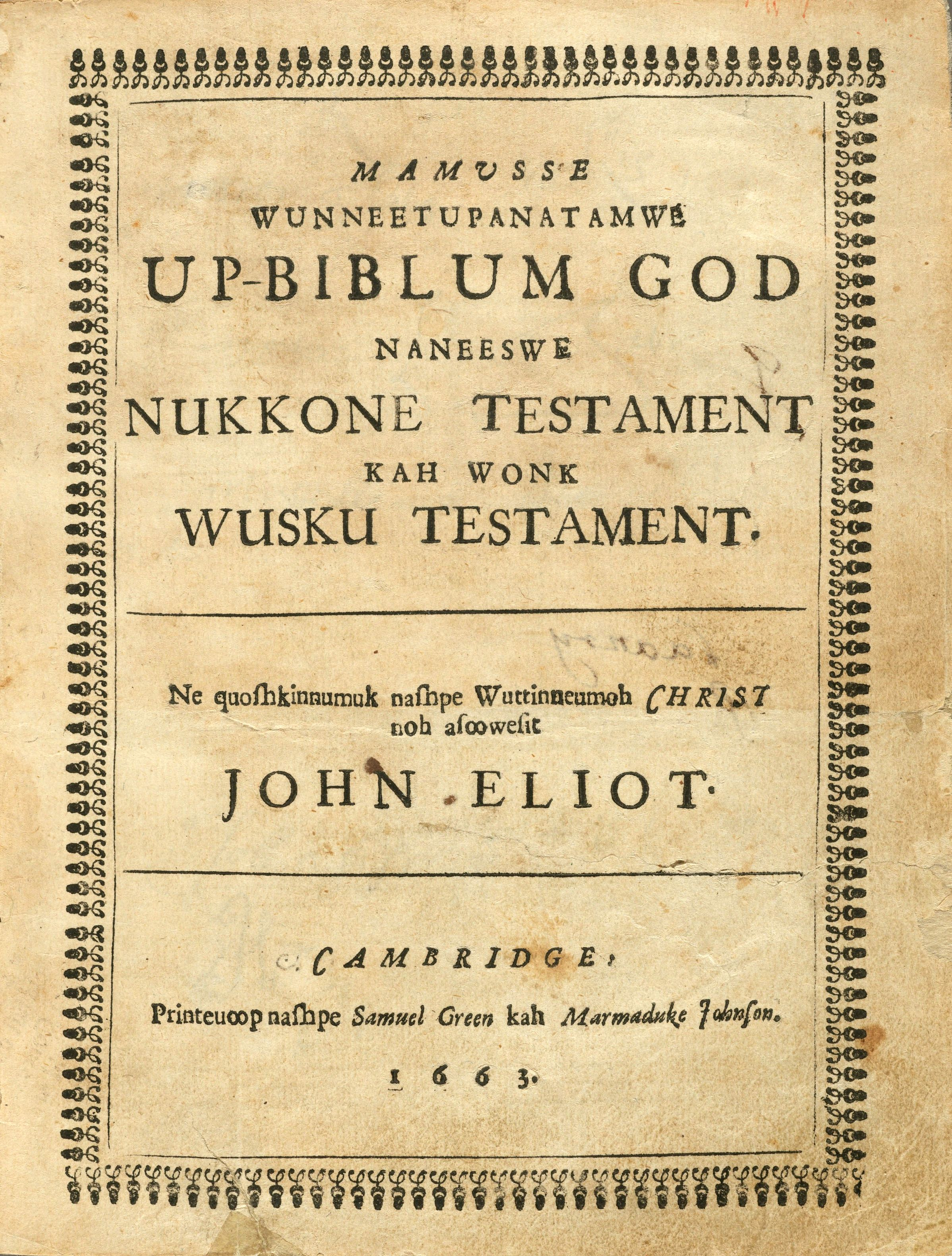
Title page

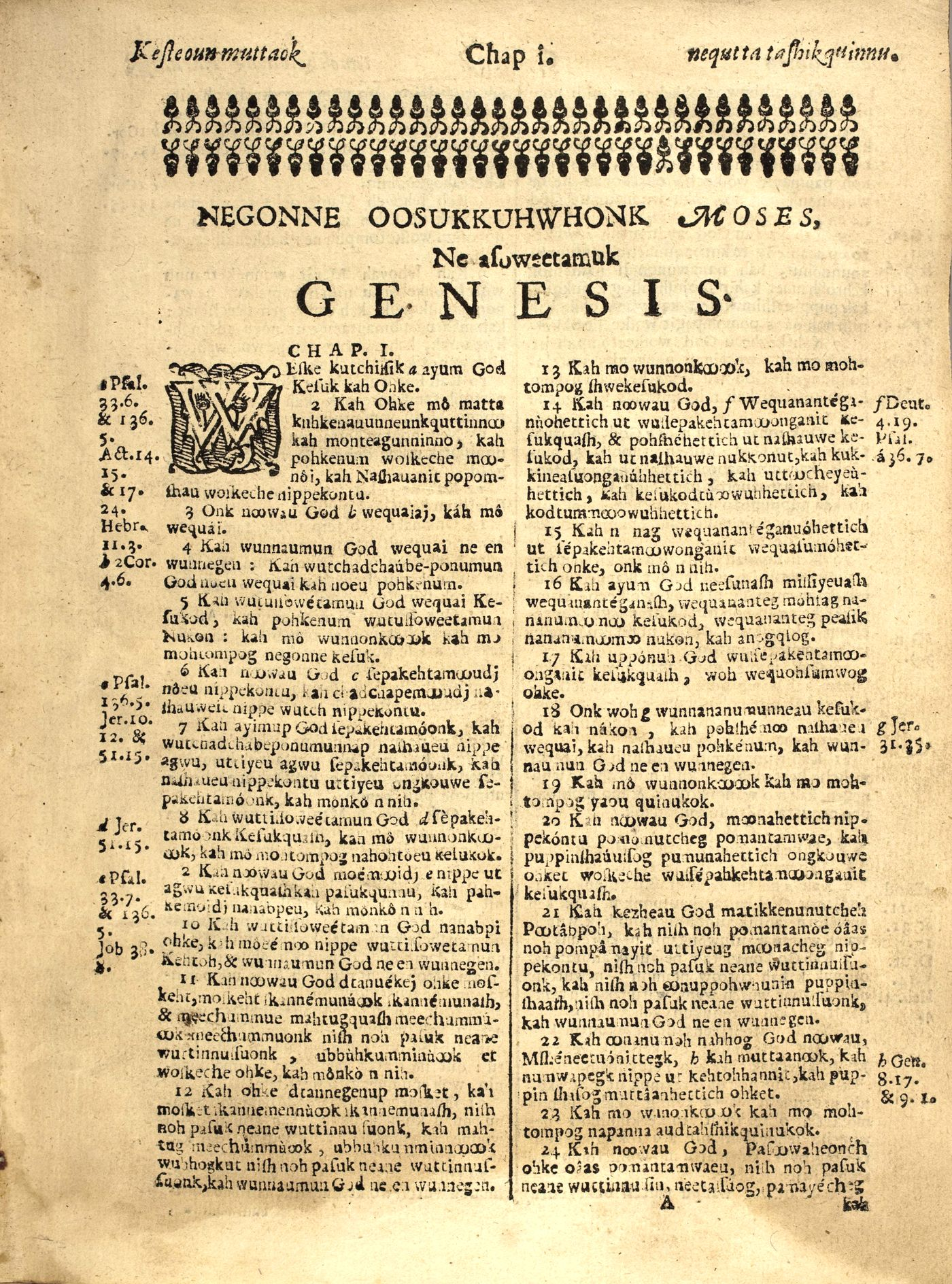
Genesis

Johnson was considered a good worker, however, during the printing production of the Indian Bible he would sometimes take leave of absence for extended periods of time, leaving Green to take on the huge task by himself, subsequently slowing down the rate of printing production. As soon as his printing contract had been completed Johnson was dismissed, and in 1664 returned to England. When he arrived there he was appointed the official printer for the New England Company, (Note: Also known as Society for the Propagation of the Gospel in New England) replacing Green, which by some accounts occurred at the insistence of John Eliot. As a subsequence of Johnson's return Green lost much of his income from the sale of the Indian tracts. Johnson's dismissal was objected to by Charles Chauncy, president of Harvard College, who in a letter of November 2, 1664, to Robert Boyle, president of the corporation, pleaded that Johnson's extraordinary ability as an experienced printer was sorely needed in Cambridge and that he be returned to Cambridge and furnished with a new font of type. Before May, 1665, Massachusetts lacked any privately owned commercial printing press. His reputation for disorderly conduct notwithstanding and with the Insistence of John Elliot and the corporation, Johnson was allowed to remain in Cambridge so he could complete his commission to print the Indian Bibles, or until August, 1664. When Johnson returned from England with his own printing press and type, with the intention of starting up his own privately operated printing press, the first to ever do so, the Act requiring printing licenses was reinstated on May 27, 1765, by the Court, with Johnson specifically in mind. The Act mandated, "that there shall be no printing presses allowed ... but in Cambridge". This constituted the first prohibition on the liberty of the press in the colonies, placed by the General Court in October, 1662, where the approval of three official licensers was required for any private printing to occur.

In 1637 King Charles had passed a Star Chamber decree regulating the complete control and censoring of any religious, political or other literature they deemed seditious or otherwise questionable. Among other regulations, it forbade any literature that criticized the Church of England, the State, or the government. (Note: The thirty-three regulations are outlined in Clyde Duniway's work of 1906.) When the Licensing of the Press Act 1662 became law its effect in the colonies was hard felt, that any printing press outside of Cambridge, location of the only sanctioned press in Massachusetts, (Note: This was the first printing press brought to the American colonies at Cambridge, in 1638, by John Daye.) was prohibited, which proved to be a serious hindrance to the business interests of Boston printers. On January 21, 1662, Johnson had his premises searched where a number of Poor Robin's Almanacks he had printed without license were confiscated. The Act, however, was repealed in 1663.

By some accounts Johnson was not known for being a man of respectable principles when it came to social matters concerning women and marriage. He was indicted in April, 1662, for "alluring the daughter of Samuel Green, printer, and drawing away her affections without the consent of her father." Further compounding matters, Johnson would sometimes make threats against the life of any man who approached her in the same manner that he had. For winning the affections of the young woman, Johnson was fined five pounds, and for his threats he was put under bonds as a measure for prompting him in keeping the peace. When he proposed marriage to Green's daughter while it was understood that he still had a wife back in England, he was ordered to return to England, however, he was able to defer the order for two years in order to complete his printing contract for the Society.

Having moved to and operating in Boston, Johnson in 1668 printed The Isle of Pines, for which he was fined £5. Johnson made several attempts to repeal these restriction by addressing the General Court with his own petitions, which initially failed. Johnson maintained that the restrictions placed upon him would have prevented him to make enough income to support himself, and would also prevent him from printing tracts that would be beneficial to the court and the commonwealth. Prompted by the insistence of John Eliot, the General Court finally concurred and accepted Johnson's petitions, with certain restrictions, and permitted him to set up his printing house in Boston on, May 30, 1674, (Note: The text of Marmaduke's petition, written in Old English, can be read in Duniway, 1906.) becoming the first printer to run his own press in the American colonies. Shortly after Johnson's petition was accepted he was elected "college printer", an action, according to historian Duniway, "probably taken with the hope of retaining in Cambridge the only well-trained printer in the colony", but Johnson regardless moved to Boston, and, however, he was taken sick, possibly from smallpox, (Note: From 1636 to 1698, Boston endured six smallpox epidemics.) and didn't live long enough to enjoy the favorable decision the Court handed down to him, and lived there until his death, December 25, 1674, shortly thereafter.

=== Works printed ===
From 1669 to 1671 Johnson, sometimes in cooperation with Green, produced works that were of special significance to trends in American publishing, during which time they printed four books which proved important for their historical and literary content. In 1669 they printed a work by Nathaniel Morton, entitled, New-England's Memoriall, the first non-religious work authored in America. The work contains the history of the Plymouth Colony and relies almost entirely on the original chronicles of the Plymouth Plantation that was written by Morton's uncle, Governor William Bradford, possibly the most handsome book produced in American colonies at the time. In 1670 two volumes of poetry: Meat out of the Eater, by Michael Wigglesworth, a lengthy work about the benefits of afflictions, and Philip Pain's Daily Meditations, originally printed by Johnson, but no copies are known to exist. The 1670 edition contains a poetical introduction written by Johnson. Both works were made available for purchase. The fourth work, which is considered the most important book printed by Johnson and Green, was Increase Mather's informative biography of his father, The Life and Death of That Reverend Man of God, Mr. Richard Mather printed in 1670.

Other works printed by Johnson include:

- Eliot, John. Baxter's Call to the Unconverted translated into the Indian Language, Cambridge, 1664. (1000 copies)
- Eliot, John. The Indian Grammar Begun, Cambridge, 1666
- Eliot, John, Communion of Churches; or the Divine Management of Gospel Churches by the Ordinance of Councils, constituted in Order, according to the Scriptures
- Brès, Guy de, The rise, spring and foundation of the Anabaptists, or re-baptized of our time, 1668
- Pain, Phillip, Daily Meditations: Or, Quotidian Preparations for and Considerations of Death and Eternity, 1670
- A Platform of Church-Discipline Gathered out of the Word of God, Cambridge, 1671
- Eliot, John. The Logick Primer. Some Logical Notions to initiate the Indians in the Knowledge of the Rule of Reason, Cambridge, 1672.
- Mather, Increase, Wo to Drunkards Two Sermons by Mather, "Testifying against the Sin of Drunkenness", Cambridge, 1673
- Mather, Increase. The Day of Trouble is near. Two Sermons preached on the December 11, 1673. Cambridge, 1674.

== Later years and legacy ==
Johnson married late in life to Ruth Cane of Cambridge on April 28, 1670, and had a daughter who died young. In 1672 Johnson printed a work by William Dyer, entitled, Christ's Famous Titles, for Joseph Farnham and Edmund Ranger. John Foster, with likely encouragement of Increase Mather, the newly appointed licenser of the press, bought Johnson's printing press and wares. It is unknown whether Johnson had printed any works in Boston, having died almost immediately after he set up shop there. (Note: In 1675, Foster printed Increase Mather's book, The Wicked Man's Portion, the first work ever printed in Boston.) In all, Johnson printed about sixty works during his career as a printer. Johnson became seriously ill from an undisclosed ailment and died on Christmas Day, December 25, 1674, at the age of forty-six. He had a son back in England who never came to the American colony to claim his father's estate. (Note: Historians, Thomas, 1874, Duniway, 1906, Franklin, 1980 and Malone, 1943, and others, give no definitive explanation for Johnson's relatively early death.)

The contributions of Marmaduke Johnson as a publisher and printer are significant in the development of publishing and printing in that early era of colonial America. The number of books he printed, by himself, or with Samuel Green, are historically significant, and serve to reveal the changing reading habits in colonial New England. It is said that Johnson's life provides a good example of an American success story, about a man with humble beginnings who rose to independence and prominence. Johnson brought to Massachusetts the technical knowledge of printing that was in short supply and badly needed, helping to make publishing take root and flourish in the colonies.

== See also ==
- Early American publishers and printers
- List of early American publishers and printers
- Bay Psalm Book — First book printed in the American colonies in 1640 by Stephen Daye, in Cambridge, Massachusetts.

== Bibliography ==
- Adams, Nehemiah (1847). The life of John Eliot; with an account of the early missionary efforts among the Indians of New England. Boston, Massachusetts Sabbath School Society.
- Brès, Guy de (1668). The rise, spring and foundation of the Anabaptists, or re-baptized of our time. Cambridge, Printed, and sold by Marmaduke Johnson.
- Byington, Ezra Hoyt (1899). The Puritan as a colonist and reformer. Boston, Little, Brown.
- Convers, Francis (1844). Jared Sparks (ed.). Life of John Eliot, the apostle to the Indians. Vol. V. New York : Harper & Brothers.
- Dearborn, Henry Alexander Scammell (1850). A sketch of the life of the apostle Eliot. Roxbury, Mass. : Norfolk County Journal Press.
- Duniway, Clyde Augustus (1906). The development of freedom of the press in Massachusetts. Vol. XII. New York, Longmans.
- Eliot, John (2003). The Eliot Tracts: With Letters from John Eliot to Thomas Thorowgood and Richard Baxter. Greenwood Publishing Group. ISBN 978-0-3133-0488-0.
- Eliot, John (1666). Marmaduke Johnson (ed.). The Indian grammar begun: or, An essay to bring the Indian language into rules, for the help of such as desire to learn the same, for the furtherance of the Gospel among them. Cambridge, Massachusetts: Printed by Marmaduke Johnson.
- Franklin, Benjamin V (1980). Boston printers, publishers, and booksellers, 1640–1800. Boston, Mass. : G.K. Hall. ISBN 9780816184729.
- Green, Samuel Abbott (1909). John Foster, The Earliest American Engraver and the First Boston Printer. Massachusetts Historical Society.
- Heath, Richard (2013). "Thomas Bell's Bequest to Roxbury Latin School and Forest Hills". Jamaica Plain Historical Society.
- Humphreys, Mary Gay (1913). Missionary explorers among the American Indians. New York, C. Scribner's sons.
- Kellaway, William (Spring 1954). "Marmaduke Johnson and a bill for type". Harvard Library Bulletin. VIII (2). Harvard University Library.
- Littlefield, George Emery (1907). The Early Massachusetts Press, 1638–1711. Vol. I. The Club of Odd Volumes.
- Matteson, David M. Matteson (1943). Malone, Dumas (ed.). Dictionary of American biography. Vol. X. New York: Charles Scribner's Sons.
- Moore, John W. (1886). Moore's historical, biographical, and miscellaneous gatherings. Concord, N.Y. Republican Press Association.
- Myles, Anne G. (March 2007). "Restoration Declensions, Divine Consolations: The Work of John Foxe in 1664 Massachusetts". The New England Quarterly. 80 (1). The New England Quarterly, Inc.: 35–68. doi:10.1162/tneq.2007.80.1.35. JSTOR 20474510. S2CID 57564104.
- Nipps, Karen (October 2014). "Cum privilegio: Licensing of the Press Act of 1662". The Library Quarterly: Information, Community, Policy. 8 (4). The University of Chicago Press: 494–500. doi:10.1086/677787. JSTOR 677787. S2CID 144070638.
- Paige, Lucius Robinson (1877). History of Cambridge, Massachusetts, 1630-1877, with a genealogical register. Boston, Houghton.
- Plomer, Henry Robert (1907). A Dictionary of the Booksellers and Printers who Were at Work in England, Scotland and Ireland from 1641 to 1667. Vol. I. Bibliographical Society. — Alternative link
- —— (1922). A dictionary of the printers and booksellers who were at work in England, Scotland and Ireland from 1668 to 1725. Vol. II. Oxford University press. "by Plomer, Henry Robert, 1856–1928; Aldis, Harry Gidney, 1863–1919; Esdaile, Arundell James Kennedy, 1880–1956; Dix, E. R. McC. (Ernest Reginald McClintock), 1857–1936; Gray, G. J. (George John), b. 1863; McKerrow, R. B. (Ronald Brunlees), 1872–1940"
- Pulsifer, David, ed. (1855). Records of the colony of New Plymouth, in New England : printed by order of the legislature of the Commonwealth of Massachusetts. Vol. II. Boston : Press of William White. "Acts of the Commissioners of the United Colonies of New England, 1653–1679"
- Roden, Robert F. (1905). The Cambridge Press, 1638–1692; a history of the first printing press established in English America. New York: Dodd, Mead and Company.
- Round, Phillip H. (2010). Removable type : histories of the book in Indian country, 1663–1880. University of North Carolina Press. ISBN 978-0-8078-3390-2.
- Thomas, Isaiah (1874). The history of printing in America, with a biography of printers. Vol. I. New York, B. Franklin.
- —— (1874). The history of printing in America, with a biography of printers. Vol. II. New York, B. Franklin.
- Wells, James M. (1985). American Printing: The Search for Self-Sufficiency (PDF). American Antiquarian Society. ISBN 978-0-9122-9669-2.
- Winship, George Parker (1945). The Cambridge Press 1638 1692. Philadelphia : University of Pennsylvania Press. Alternative printing
- Winsor, Justin (1880). Jewett Clarence F. (ed.). The memorial history of Boston : including Suffolk County, Massachusetts. 1630-1880. Vol. I. Boston : Ticknor and Company.
- Wroth, Lawrence C. (1938). The Colonial Printer. Portland, Me., The Southworth-Anthoensen press.
- "A Ribald Acrostic in the Eliot Indian Bible". Massachusetts Historical Society. August 2007.
