= The Weekly Rehearsal =

Newspaper

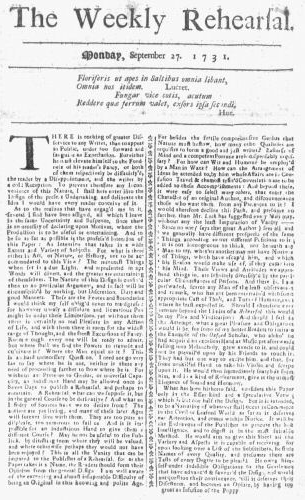
The Weekly Rehearsal, September 27, 1731 (American Antiquarian Society)

The Weekly Rehearsal or The Rehearsal (1731–1735) was a literary newspaper published in Boston, Massachusetts, in the 1730s. Jeremiah Gridley served as editor and publisher (1731-1733); other publishers/printers included John Draper and Thomas Fleet. In 1735 it was continued by Thomas Fleet's Boston Evening Post.

== See also ==
- The Boston Evening-Post, successor to The Rehearsal

== Image gallery ==
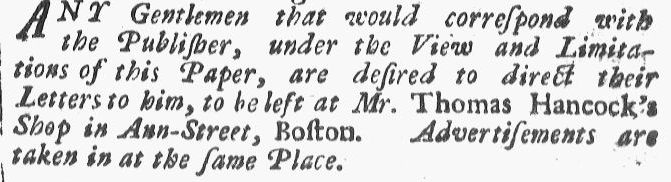
Thomas Hancock on Ann Street served as conduit for The Rehearsal's correspondence, 1731

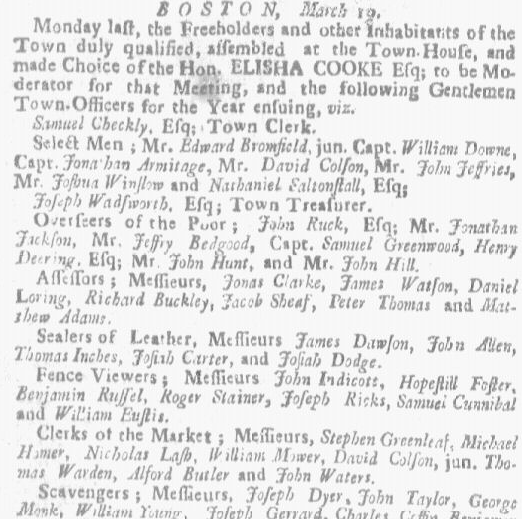
Announcement of newly elected Boston selectmen, 1733

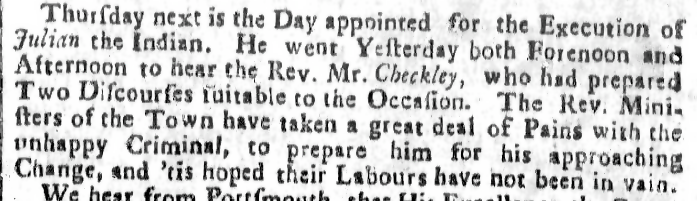
Item about execution of Julian the Indian 1733

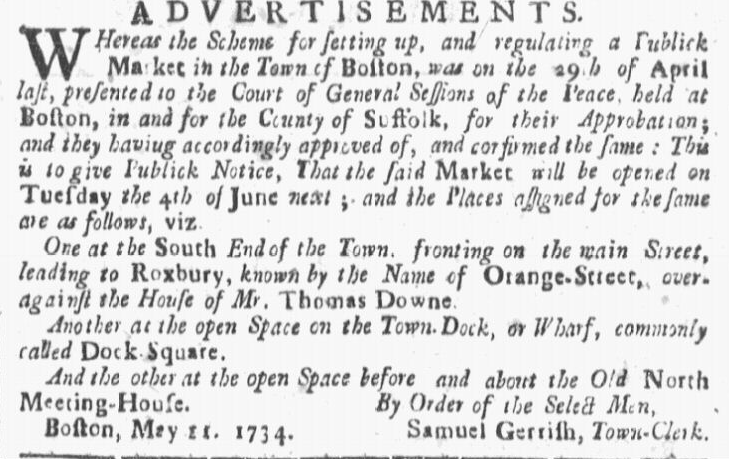
Item about public marketplaces in Boston, 1734

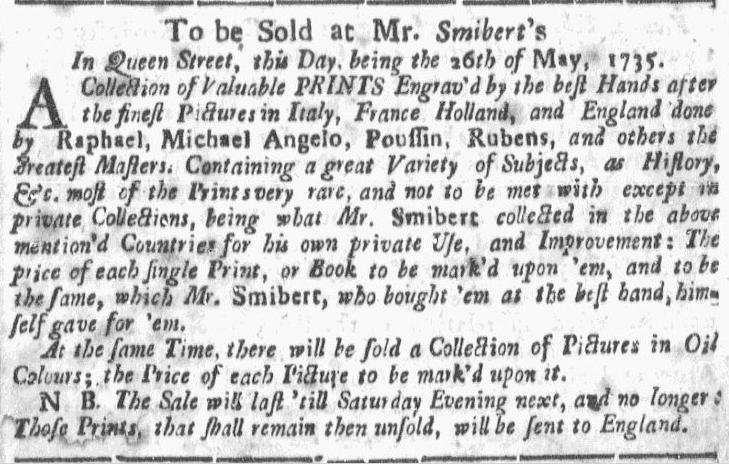
Announcement of art sale at John Smibert's house, Queen Street, Boston, 1735
