= Peter Fleet =

Woodcut artist and printer

- Born: unknown unknown
- Died: 1758; Boston?
- Occupations: enslaved engraver and printer
- Years active: 1730s-1750s
- Children: Pompey Fleet, Ceasar Fleet

Peter Fleet (d. 1758?) was the earliest known African-American woodcut artist, typesetter, and newspaperman. Fleet was enslaved by Massachusetts printer Thomas Fleet. According to Isaiah Thomas, who wrote the first history of early American printers, Peter Fleet was "an ingenious man, and cut, on wooden blocks, all the pictures which decorated the ballads and small books of his master." Fleet also typeset articles for Thomas Fleet's long-running newspaper, The Boston Evening-Post, which, according to recent scholarship, published an unusually high number of articles about slave revolts and stories of special concern to Black people that no other provincial newspaper bothered to publish. Also enslaved by Thomas Fleet were two younger men, Pompey Fleet and Ceasar Fleet, sometimes identified as Peter Fleet's sons, both of whom were also printers in Thomas Fleet's shop.

== Woodcuts for The Prodigal Daughter ==
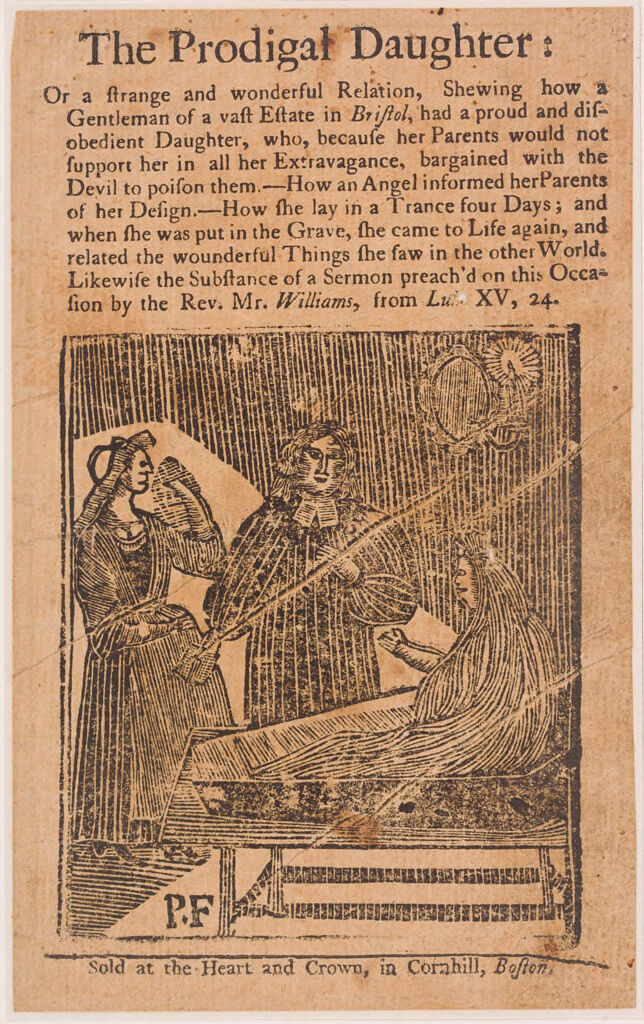
Woodcut print illustration by Peter Fleet, made for an early American pamphlet published by Thomas Fleet.

Around 1736, an illustrated pamphlet entitled The Prodigal Daughter was published from Thomas Fleet's address. It was reprinted at least two more times by Fleet or his son over the next 40 years. The first illustration in the pamphlet includes the initials "PF," which were identified by print historian Sinclair Hamilton in 1958 as those of Pompey Fleet or "his father," whose name was not known at the time of Hamilton's work; more recent scholarship identifies the work squarely as Peter Fleet's due to its date. This single print is currently the only known signed example of Peter Fleet's work, though there are believed to be many examples of his unsigned work throughout Thomas Fleet's imprints held in print ephemera collections. The identification of Fleet as the creator of this image has encouraged some scholars to advocate that authorship is but one of the multiple hands that touch a book in its production process. Peter Fleet is not known to have had any apprentices, but, as Eric Slauter speculates, it is possible that he may have influenced other Black and enslaved artisans.

== Last will ==
In June 1743, Fleet dictated his last will and testament to Nathan Bowen, junior, a young white man who also witnessed the document. Bowen was probably the son of Nathan Bowen of Marblehead, Massachuetts. The elder Nathan Bowen was a wealthy merchant and notary public.

The transcription reads:

Here Children I leave you some thing, that’s more than any Richest Master’s, Servant would leave to their Master’s Children considering what profit I have to my trade. Thomas Fleet jun Ten shillings and a pair of Buckles; but shall not wear them in three years from ye. time he has them. John Fleet—five shillings. Anne Fleet—five shillings. Elizabeth Fleet—five shillings. Simon five Shillings. Nathan Bowen junr. five Shilllings. Thomas Oliver five Shillings.

What little I had thought to give it to Molley; but thought her sister Anne would make a scuable, and take it from her; that made me continue (Note: ADDENDUM, 3 Aug 2017: Caitlin G. DeAngelis reports this word looks more like "contrive" in the manuscript) so to do, &c.—There is more than enough, yet, left for Molley, because she is very good to servants.

Master and Mistres, I would not have you think that I got this money by Rogury in any thing belong’d to you or any body else, I got it honestly; by being faithful to people ever since I undertook to carry ye. Newspapers, Christmas-days, & New-years days, with contribution with gentlemen sometimes 3 pounds 10/s. and sometimes 4 pounds 10/s. and in ye. years 1743, 5 pounds I would Give you a true account; in my Box you may find a little cask with money, yt. I had when Mr. Wollington was here, I could say when Mr. Vaux was here, that I had some of his money, but I had so much dealing with a wench, yt: I don’t think that I have any of his money. One Way I and Love use to have when we had a great Work for ye. Booksellers, when money we use to have for to get Drink we kept it. I am not great Drinker Nor no Smooker, and I have a little more wit than I use to have formerly amongst ye. wenches.—You may find in my box a 3 pound Bill which I had for my Robin.

All that’s left is for Moley & Venis.

Boston, June ye. 2, 1743. Peter Fleet

By Massachusetts law, Fleet's white master owned all his possessions. To ensure that his son, Robin, would inherit the enslaved printer’s £3 bank note, Fleet dictated a will designed to protect his estate from his master. In the first paragraph, Fleet made each white child a beneficiary, an excellent way to gain support for his will in his master’s household.

The fate of Peter Fleet's children is uncertain. Thomas Fleet left no will when he died on July 21, 1758, but letters of administration were granted to his son William on December 15, 1758, and the inventory of his estate is dated June 1, 1759. The five enslaved people were valued as follows:

Negro Woman Named Venus abot 33 years old 25 00 0

D° Boy Abram 3 years old 6 13 4

D° Girl Jenny 6 years old 16 00 0

D° Boy Pompey 14 years old 40 00 0

D° Boy Ceasar 11 years old 33 06 8

In an account rendered August 31, 1759, it is stated that £4 were received in cash “for Negro Girl Jenny above the apprist.”.

== Death ==
Peter Fleet probably lived long after dictating his will in 1743. While no official record has been found, he most likely died on Thursday, 20 July 1758.

In the Boston Gazette and Country Journal, the printers John Gill and Benjamin Edes reported "On Friday Morning last died, after a long Indisposition, Mr. Thomas Fleet, in the 73d Year of his Age. He was for many Years a considerable Printer in this Town; and was remarkable for his Understanding and Industry in the Business of his own Profession.". Almost as an afterthought, the printers added "On Thursday Night last a Negro man belonging to the above Deceased, being out in an open Boat, by some Accident fell overboard and was drowned." Fleet’s two sons were more succinct in their report in their father’s paper: ‘Thursday last as Two Negroes were out in a Canoe a fishing, one of them belonging to the late Publisher of this Paper, had the Misfortune to fall overboard and was drowned’.
