= Thomas Fleet =

English printer

- Born: September 8, 1685; Colony of Virginia
- Died: July 21, 1758 (aged 72); Boston, Massachusetts
- Resting place: Granary Burying Ground
- Occupations: Printer, Newspaper publisher
- Spouse: Elizabeth Goose
- Children: Two sons and three daughters

Thomas Fleet (September 8, 1685 – July 21, 1758) was an English printer who emigrated to the British colonies in America and established himself as a printer and publisher in Boston. His decision to move to the colonies was prompted by people seeking retribution for what was considered his public display of disrespect for a popular member of the English clergy. Fleet produced works for various booksellers, printed pamphlets, ballads, children's stories and later established the Boston Evening Post. In his earlier years Fleet compiled his own version of Mother Goose from stories told by his mother-in-law, Elizabeth Vergoose, to his children. When he published various controversial accounts about the colonial government and the clergy he was admonished, threatened with prosecution and subsequently became one of the first American printers to challenge royal authority and defend the idea of Freedom of the Press. Through his newspaper Fleet played an active role in the Christian revivalist controversy that occurred in the colonies during the early eighteenth century.

== Early life and family ==
Thomas Fleet was born on September 8, 1685, in Tilstock, a chapelry in the parish of Whitchurch, of Shropshire in England, the son of Thomas and Isabella Fleet. He learned the printing business in Bristol, England where he served as an apprentice and later worked as a journeyman.

Fleet's decision to emigrate to the American colonies came about under unusual circumstances. While he was working in Bristol one day "the notorious" Henry Sacheverell, an English high church Anglican clergyman, was passing through on his way to his new home in Salatin. The townspeople gathered along the route, waving flags and cheering him on for preaching his controversial sermons against the established Congregationalists of England, which he also had printed. The House of Commons had ruled that their publication amounted to malicious and seditious libels. As the procession passed by the building where Fleet was working he accordingly concocted his own flag, hurriedly made from a halter-top fixed to a pole, and began waving it from a window. The crowd considered this a sign of contempt and disrespect and began throwing stones and other objects at the window where Fleet was standing, and then proceeded to storm the house in pursuit of Fleet. Fleet made his way to the roof of the building and made his escape running and hopping to other rooftops of the adjacent buildings, then disappeared down a quiet street and soon fled to London. After remaining there for a time he returned to Bristol with the hopes that his unintended offense had been forgotten about, but to no avail. Realizing he was no longer safe working at his former job and in his community he subsequently thought it was wise to distance himself from England altogether and made his way to Boston in the American colonies.

Fleet arrived at Boston in 1712, and soon established his printing shop with T. Crump, on Pudding Lane, which later was renamed Devonshire Street. According to historian Isaiah Thomas, Fleet and Crump printed several books together but never formed an actual partnership.

Fleet married Elizabeth Goose (Note: Goose is a shortened version of Vergoose.) on June 8, 1715, the daughter of a wealthy man, Isaac Vergoose, and his wife, Elizabeth, living in Boston. Their wedding was conducted by the celebrated Cotton Mather. Their marriage brought four sons and three daughters. The first two siblings died young. Fleet's sons, Thomas Jr. and John, both born in Boston, went on to be printers who eventually took over their father's newspaper.

== Printing career ==
Fleet began his printing trade by producing works for booksellers, and also pamphlets, ballads and similar material for his own business purposes. Also a writer of children's fables, Fleet achieved an unusual place in American literary history in 1719 when he authored an American version of Mother Goose, entitled Songs for the Nursery; or, Mother Goose's Melodies. (Note: Fleet's usage of Mother Goose alludes to his mother-in-law, Vergoose. Hence, the term Mother Goose's Melodies. i.e. Not to be confused with the original Mother Goose that dates back to the early 17th century.) He obtained many of the rhymes and ditties listening to the constant recitals of nursery rhymes to his children, from his mother-in-law, named Elizabeth Vergoose, or Goose. Fleet's collection of Mother Goose's Melodies proved to be a popular work and sold very well.

Beginning in 1729 Fleet was the official printer for the Massachusetts House of Representatives, performing in this capacity until 1731 when he removed from Pudding Lane to a house in Cornhill, which he eventually purchased in 1744. It was a spacious structure which afforded him a residence, printing shop and a store front, with a sign displaying his trade mark of the "Heart and Crown." Here he conducted evening auctions of books along with household goods and other wares.

Fleet was introduced to the newspaper publishing business when he was the printer for a weekly newspaper in Boston called The Weekly Rehearsal, owned and edited by Jeremy Gridley, a young lawyer in Boston. The first issue was printed on September 27, 1731, with an inscription which read "Boston: Printed by J. Draper, for the Author". It accepted advertisements and featured essays of a moral and philosophical nature. Upon commencement of his newly acquired newspaper Fleet published a declaration stating that he belonged to no political party, and that he would lend his newspaper to . . .

" . . . all gentlemen of leisure and capacity, inclined on either side, to write any thing of a political nature, that tends to enlighten and serve the public, to communicate their productions, provided they are not over long, and confined within modesty and good manners; for all possible care will be taken that nothing contrary to these shall ever be here published."

On August 21, 1732, Fleet assumed all the responsibility for the printing and management of the newspaper. By April 2, 1733, he became the sole proprietor of the newspaper and changed its name to the Boston Evening-Post, which was "printed ... at the Heart & Crown in Cornhill". Fleet managed The Post with energy, and it became a popular newspaper, with much attention given to local news, where Fleet would sometimes append critical or satirical comments. After his death its publication was continued to 1775 by Fleet's son and grandson, who changed the "obnoxious crown" on the sign to a Bible. They continued publication up until five days after the Battles of Lexington and Concord during the American Revolutionary War. Publication ended due to the accusations the Fleet brothers, as journalists, received from revolutionary proponents over the neutral position they took concerning the revolution.

Attesting to his imprimatur, Fleet printed and published many works for notable people like Cotton Mather, while he also printed tracts relating to the George Whitefield controversy. Other works included, The Soveraignty and Goodness of God...(1720); The Redeemed Captive, by John Williams (1720); The History of the Wars of New- England with the Eastern Indians, by Samuel Penhallow (1726); The New England Primer Enlarged, (1737–38); A Brief Narrative of the Case and Tryal of John Peter Zenger, (1738); Cato by Joseph Addison (1750); and The Day of Doom, (1751), by Michael Wigglesworth.

In the 1730s there were few persons in Boston who could "cut" on wood or type metal. As the printer of the Boston Evening Post, he became the rival of Zechariah Fowle in the printing of ballads. Fleet had a negro slave named Peter Fleet. Thomas illustrated his ballads using the cuts made by Peter. Fleet had tried his hand at crafting his own cuts, and once was compelled to using those used by Fowle, but they did not compare in quality with those that were crafted by Peter. He also taught Peter to work the press and to set type. Some of the children's books Fleet printed included decorative images made from the wood engravings cut for them by Peter. While working for Fleet, Peter had two sons, Crcsar and Pompey, who were born in Fleet's house, and who also became printers.

On 9 March 1741, Fleet was summoned to appear before the Council Chamber in Boston to account for printing what was considered "a scandalous and libelous Reflection upon his Majesty's Administration" but nothing became of the matter on the grounds that his account was truthful. Fleet also had his indifferences with the clergy when he published a sermon made by John Wesley on Free Grace. For this he was denounced from the pulpit by the Reverend John Morehead, (Note: John Morehead (1703-1773) was the first Pastor of the ‘'Church of the Presbyterian Strangers'’ in Boston.) who publicly derided Fleet and the liberty taken with his printing-press. Fleet in his own defense was effective in his "good-natured" reply to the charges made against him and in his defense of the liberty of the Press.

=== Revivalist controversy ===
In 1743 a religious newspaper called The Christian History made its first appearance at Boston. The editors were Thomas Prince, a Boston clergyman, together with his two sons. It was printed by Samuel Kneeland and was published weekly on Saturday. The Christian History, played an important role in the Great Awakening by reporting on the religious revivals that were sweeping Europe and the American colonies in the early eighteenth century. Prince's primary critic was Thomas Fleet who emerged on the scene as Prince's nemesis during the public debates over religious revivalism. Fleet's inclination to publicly criticize Prince was prompted by more than one reason. Fleet was an Anglican, traditionally indifferent to the Congregationalists, and subsequently he was considered an outsider by the Congregationalist establishment. Also, Fleet was relatively new to the newspaper business, which at the time was dominated by two of Fleet's major newspaper competitors in Boston: Samuel Kneeland and Timothy Green, both senior members of Prince's parish and publishers of the rival newspaper, The Boston Gazette.

Fleet considered Prince's Christian History as a highly partisan newspaper. Through his newspaper, the Boston Evening Post, in the March 7, 1743, issue, Fleet published, what would be become his opening remarks in a series of articles criticizing Prince's newspaper, claiming that it was a "Party Paper . . . design'd only for the Use of special Friends, it being with great Difficulty that we could obtain one . . . ". On April 4, Fleet also published correspondence which challenged Prince's premise in explaining the recent religious revival. He also criticized The Christian History for remaining silent on some questionable financial affairs pertaining to George Whitefield, (Note: Whitefield arrived in Boston in 1740 to help the Presbyterians in the general area in the effort to promote the revival.) another strong voice in the revivalist movement who openly criticized the "Anglican degeneracy". The Boston Gazette responded by accusing Fleet for using selective quotes they claimed were misleading to his readers. Fleet in turn responded with a "frontal attack" on Prince's Christian History. The controversy between the two newspapers, along with other colonial newspapers, served to bring more attention to the revivalist issues and Prince finally achieved his goal of creating a Great Awakening in the colonies, although he did not live long enough to see it fully realized.

== Final years and legacy ==
Thomas Fleet died after a long illness on 21 July 1758 in Boston at the age of 73 and is buried in the historic Granary Burying Ground in Boston. In January of the following year Fleet's estate was appraised at £959 and presented at the Probate Office. Fleet's wife, Elizabeth, died in 1775 at the age of 81, surviving her husband by seventeen years.

On the death of Fleet the Evening Post was carried on by his sons Thomas and John, and they continued to publish it until 1775. From 1779 until 1801 his sons published Fleet's Annual Register and later printed the first edition of Thomas Hutchinson's History of Massachusetts.

Fleet has been credited for printing more than 250 books, pamphlets and tracts, aside from his newspapers, between 1713 and 1758.

== See also ==
- List of early American publishers and printers
- History of American newspapers
- History of printing

== Bibliography ==
- Buckingham, Joseph Tinker (1850). Specimens of Newspaper Literature : with personal memoirs, anecdotes, and reminiscences. Vol. I. Boston : Charles C. Little and James Brown.
- Franklin, Benjamin V (1980). Boston printers, publishers, and booksellers, 1640-1800. Boston, Mass. : G.K. Hall. ISBN 9780816184729.
- Gloege, Timothy E. W. (March 2013). "The Trouble with "Christian History": Thomas Prince's "Great Awakening"". Church History. 82 (1). Cambridge University Press: 125–165. doi:10.1017/S0009640712002545. JSTOR 23358908. S2CID 162507290.
- Gillies, John; Seymour, Aaron Crossley Hobart (1820). Memoirs of the life and character of the late Rev. George Whitefield ... Philadelphia : Printed and published by Simon Probasco.
- Hudson, Frederic (1873). Journalism in the United States, from 1690 to 1872. New York, Harper & Brothers.
- Hart, James David (1995). The Oxford companion to American literature. New York : Oxford University Press. ISBN 978-0-1950-65480.
- Lee, James Melvin (1923). History of American journalism. Boston, New York, Houghton Mifflin Company. ( Alternative publication )
- Loetscher, Frederick W. (December 1921). "Presbyterianism in Colonial New England Part II". Journal of the Presbyterian Historical Society (1901-1930). 11 (3/4). Presbyterian Historical Society: 97–118. JSTOR 23323620.
- "Songs for the Nursery; Or, Mother Goose's Melodies". Oxford Reference: The Oxford University Press.
- Malone, Dumas; Johnson, Allen, eds. (1930). Dictionary of American Biography: Fleet, Thomas. Vol. III. Charles Scribner's Sons, New York. Title Page
- Ringwalt, John Luther (1871). American encyclopaedia of printing. Philadelphia, Menamin & Ringwalt.
- Stephens, Henry Louis; Fay, Gaston (1869). Mother Goose's Melodies for Children, Or Songs for the Nursery: With Notes. Riverside Press.
- Tebbel, John William (1972). A history of book publishing in the United States / Vol. I, The creation of an industry, 1630-1865. Vol. I. New York : Bowker. ISBN 9780835204897.
- Thomas, Isaiah (1874). The history of printing in America, with a biography of printers. Vol. I. New York, B. Franklin.
- —— (1874). The history of printing in America, with a biography of printers. Vol. II. New York, B. Franklin.
- Van de Wetering, John E. (June 1966). "The "Christian History" of the Great Awakening". Journal of Presbyterian History. 44 (2). Presbyterian Historical Society: 122–129. JSTOR 23326180.
- White, James T. (1924). The National Cyclopaedia of American Biography. Vol. XX. New York : James T. White.
- Wilson, John Grant; Fiske, John, eds. (1900). Appletons' Cyclopaedia of American Biography. Vol. II. New York, D. Appleton.
