= Robert Aitken (publisher) =

American printer (1734–1802)

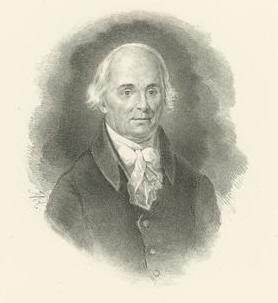
- Born: January 22, 1735; Dalkeith
- Died: July 15, 1802
- Occupations: Printer, book dealer, publisher
- Children: Jane Aitken

Robert Aitken (1734–1802) (also spelled Aitkin) was an Early American publisher and printer in Philadelphia and the first to publish an English language Bible in the United States after its formation. He was born in Dalkeith, Scotland. He emigrated to Philadelphia in 1769, where he published Pennsylvania Magazine, or American Monthly Museum in 1775–76. Aitken printed the first copies of the New Testament to appear in the colonies in 1777 and continued through 1781. He died in Philadelphia in 1802.

Starting in Philadelphia as a bookseller in 1769 and 1771, Aitken started publication of The Pennsylvania Magazine in 1775 with content derived from the colonies. English political activist Thomas Paine, who had just immigrated to Philadelphia with a letter of recommendation from Benjamin Franklin, contributed two pieces to the magazine's inaugural issue and Aitken hired him as editor. The Magazine's readership rapidly expanded, achieving a greater circulation in the colonies than any American magazine up until that point. While Aitken had conceived of the magazine as nonpolitical, Paine brought a political perspective to its content, writing in its first issue that "every heart and hand seem to be engaged in the interesting struggle for American Liberty."

On March 8, 1775, an unsigned abolitionist essay titled African Slavery in America was published. It attacked slavery as an "execrable commerce" and "outrage against Humanity and Justice."

== Aitken Bible of 1782 ==
The Aitken Bible of 1782 was reviewed, approved, and recommended, and Aitken was authorized to publish the recommendation by the Congress of the Confederation. The Bible was reviewed first for accuracy by the Congressional Chaplains White and Duffield and they reported on its accuracy. Then the Journals of Congress for September 1782 records on page 469:

"Resolved, That the United States in Congress assembled, highly approve the pious and laudable undertaking of Mr. Aitken, as subservient to the interest of religion as well as the progress of the arts in this country, and being satisfied from the above report, of his care and accuracy in the execution of the work, they recommend this edition of the Bible to the inhabitants of the United States, and hereby authorize him to publish this recommendation in the manner he shall think proper."

Due to the severing of trade with Great Britain due to war, Aitken undertook in 1781 to supply a complete English Bible made in America and sought the official sanction of Congress for the publication of his edition. Congress passed a resolution officially authorizing its recommendation of the edition in September 1782. Known as the “Aitken Bible,” this was the first and only edition of the Bible ever bearing a recommendation authorized by Congress. Aitken later reported to George Washington that he lost money on the venture due to cheap imported Bibles flooding back into the American market after the war.

Although it is widely claimed that Aitken's Bible was the first complete English version published in America, reportedly an earlier one had been published in 1752 by Boston publishers Kneeland and Green, but it bore a counterfeit "London" imprint to evade the crown copyright restrictions.

== Need for an American printed Bible ==
The war with Britain had cut off the supply of Bibles, and, on September 11, 1777, the Continental Congress reviewed a committee report, informing them that a locally produced Bible may not be a viable option, due to the risk and cost of procuring the materials necessary. The committee noted, "...the use of the Bible is so universal, and its importance so great, that the committee refer the above to the consideration of Congress, and if Congress shall not think it expedient to order the importation of types and paper, your committee recommend that Congress will order the Committee of Commerce to import 20,000 Bibles from Holland, Scotland, or elsewhere, into the different ports of the states in the Union." Congress favored the idea of importing 20,000 Bibles, in order to address the short supply. Library of Congress

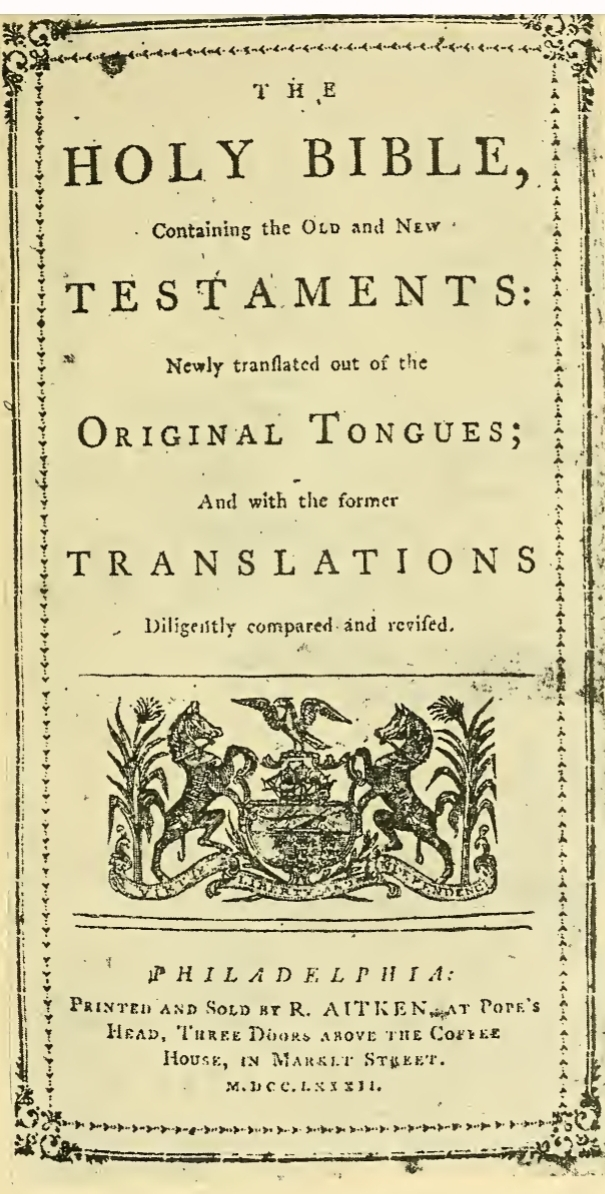

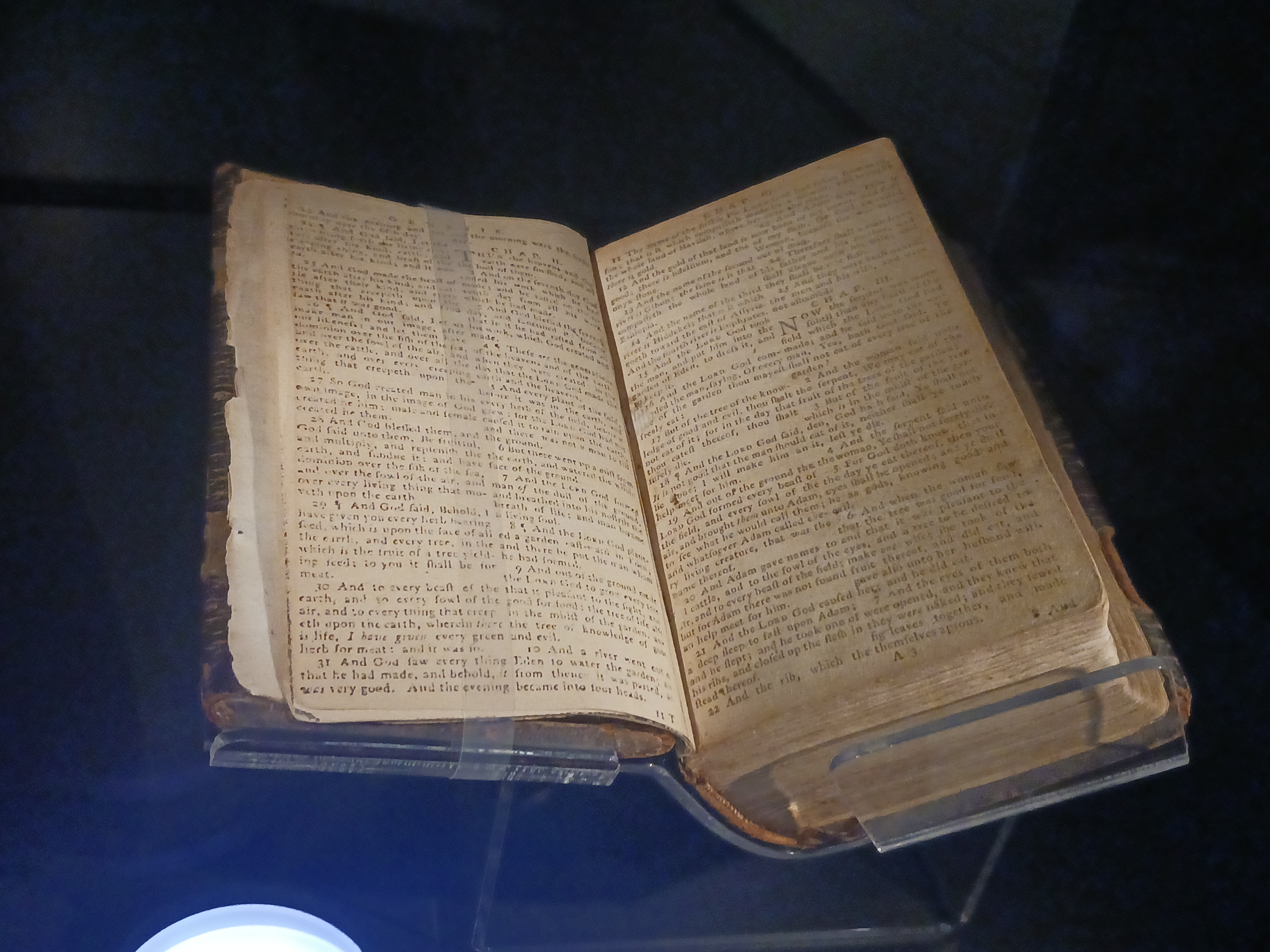

On Thursday, September 12, 1782, Congress reviewed a report dated September 1, 1782, from their Congressional committee, and signed by the committee Chairman, James Duane. The committee had been, "...referred a memorial of Robert Aitkin, dated January 21st, 1781, respecting an edition of the holy scriptures." This committee had, from time to time, checked on the progress of Aitken's work, and their report stated, "Our knowledge of your piety and public spirit leads us without apology to recommend to your particular attention the edition of the holy scriptures publishing by Mr. Aitkin." Library of Congress Next Congress reviewed a report dated September 10, 1782, from the committee, and signed by the Chaplains of the United States in Congress assembled, William White and George Duffield. This report stated they had reviewed the printing and it was found to be, "...with as few grammatical and typographical errors as could be expected in an undertaking of such magnitude." Library of Congress The outcome is listed as, "Resolved. That the United States in Congress assembled highly approve the pious and laudable undertaking of Mr. Aitkin, as subservient to the interest of religion as well as an influence of the progress of arts in this country and being satisfied from the above report (by the congressional chaplains), they recommend this edition of the bible to the inhabitants of the United States and hereby authorize him to publish this recommendation."

In 1783, after Aitken's Bible had begun to be distributed, Dr. John Rodgers of the First Presbyterian Church of New York suggested to General George Washington that every discharged soldier be given a copy of Aitken's Bible. Since the war was coming to a close and Congress had already ordered the discharge of two-thirds of the army, the suggestion came too late. However, Washington said, "It would have pleased me well, if Congress had been pleased to make such an important present to the brave fellows who have done so much for the security of their country's rights and establishment."

== See also ==
- Early American publishers and printers
- Jane Aitken

== Bibliography ==
- Thomas, Isaiah (1874). The history of printing in America, with a biography of printers. Vol. I. New York, B. Franklin.
- Parkinson, Robert G. (2021). "Print, the Press, and the American Revolution". Oxford Research Encyclopedia of American History. Oxford University Press. doi:10.1093/acrefore/9780199329175.013.9. ISBN 978-0-19-932917-5.
- Journals of Congress, September 1782, pages 468-469. (Library of Congress)
- Who Was Who in America, Historical Volume, 1607–1896. Chicago: Marquis Who's Who, 1967.
- The Holy Bible as Printed by Robert Aitken and Approved & Recommended by the Congress of the United States of America in 1782. New York: Arno Press, 1968.
- Unknown. United States. National Archives. From George Washington to John Rodgers, 11 June 1783. The Rector and Visitors of the University of Virginia, Web. <https://founders.archives.gov/documents/Washington/99-01-02-11434>.
