= Samuel Kneeland (printer) =

American printer (c.1696–1769)

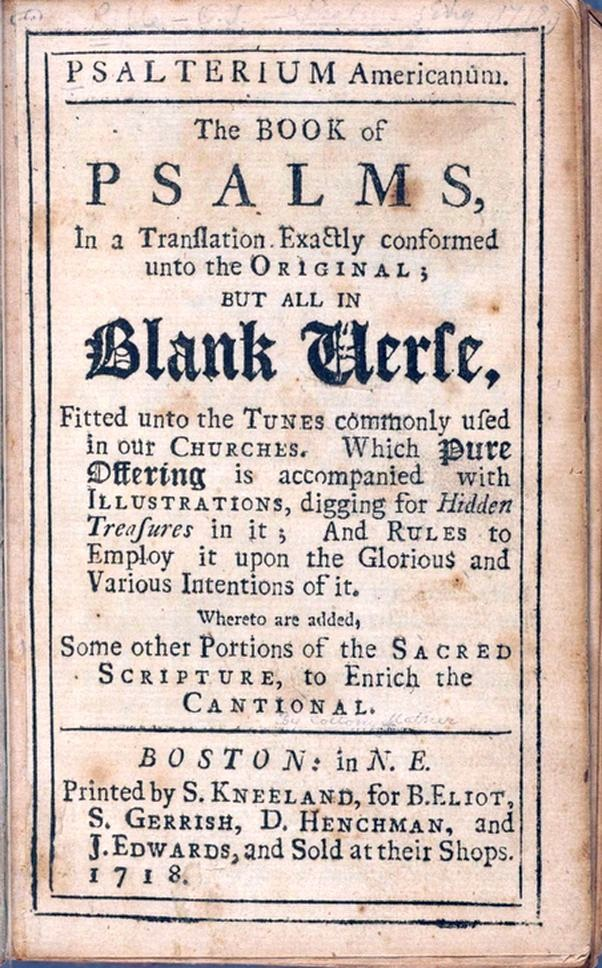
Book of Psalms Printed by Samuel Kneeland, 1718

Samuel Kneeland (Note: Spellings of the ancestral family name also include Kneland and Cleland.) (c.1696–1769) was an American printer and publisher of The Boston Gazette and Weekly Journal. Kneeland obtained much of his work printing laws and other official documents for the Province of Massachusetts Bay colonial government for about two decades. He printed the first Bible in the English language ever produced in the American colonies, along with many other religious and spiritual works, including the Book of Psalms. He was also noted for introducing a number of innovations to newspaper printing and journalism. He was one of many colonial printers who were strongly opposed to and outspoken against the Stamp Act in 1765. Kneeland, primarily, along with his sons, were responsible for printing the greater majority of books, magazines and pamphlets published in Boston during his lifetime.

== Early life and family heritage ==
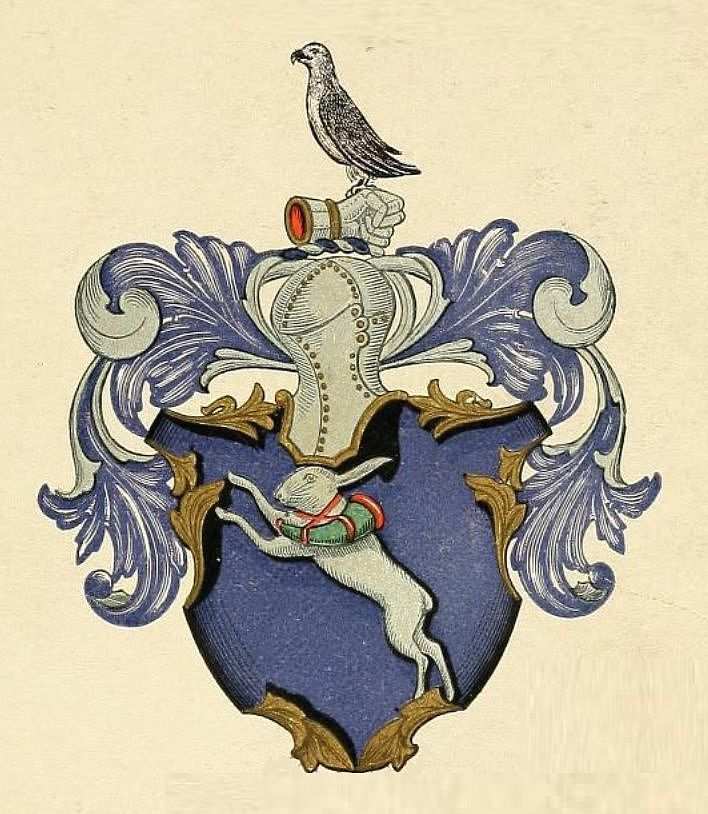
Kneeland Coat of Arms Granted to James Kneland, by Robert the Bruce, after the Battle of Bannockburn

Samuel Kneeland was born in Boston and entered into the printing business at about 1718. His parents were John Kneeland and Mary (Green) Kneeland, who had eight children, of which he was the third born. (Note: His siblings include: Mary, b. 1692; John, b. 1694; Joseph, b. 1698; Sarah, b. 1700; Hannah, b. 1703; Rachael, b. 1705.) He was named after his grandfather, Samuel Green, a printer in Boston, and his great-grandfather, Samuel Green, of Cambridge, England, the publisher of the Cambridge Bible. His printing shop was located on Prison lane, now called Court Street, at the corner of Dorset's alley in Boston. This building was used for eighty years as a printing house by Kneeland and his sons and grandsons. On February 8, 1721, Kneeland married Mary Alden, of Boston, a granddaughter of Captain John Alden, a merchant, politician and sailor of Boston. (Note: John Alden's mother and father John Alden and Priscilla Alden had settled in Plymouth Colony in 1620, arriving on the Pilgrim ship Mayflower.) He had respectable friends, who helped him get started in the printing business with the capitol to acquire the necessary printing materials when he became of age. His younger sister, Hannah Kneeland, born 1703, married Jeremiah Townsend, of Boston, on April 16, 1734. Kneeland was the father of four sons, all of whom became printers. Two of them, John and Daniel set up a press, and entered into partnership before their father's death, while other two were never to established their own businesses. Samuel Kneeland and his sons, with their various partnerships, continued to capture the greater large share of the printing business in Boston. It is estimated that between 1705 and 1785 three out of four books printed and published in Boston bore the Kneeland imprint.

== Career ==
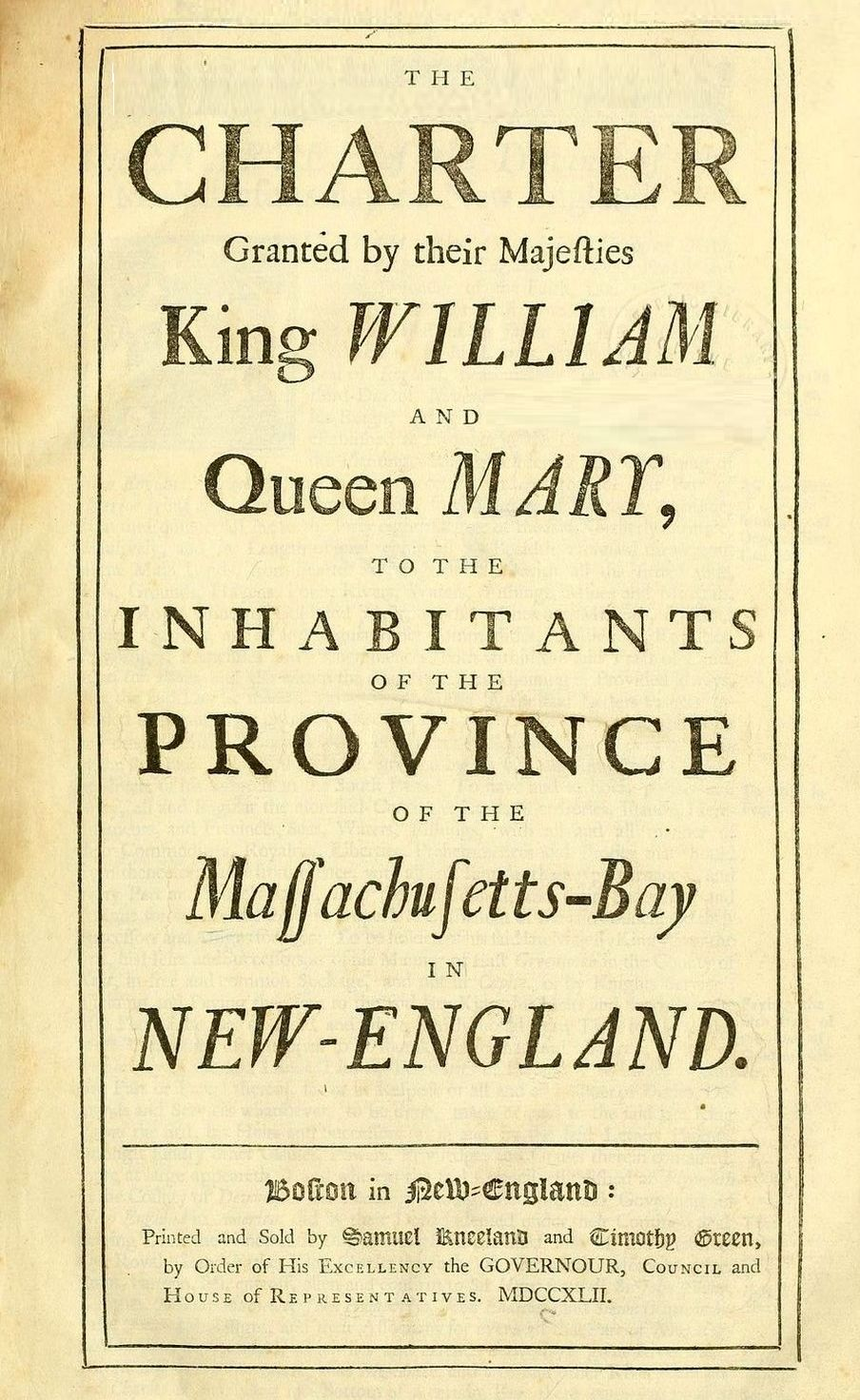
Charter, Massachusetts Bay, outlining various Acts and laws, printed by Samuel Kneeland, 1742

Kneeland was apprenticed to Bartholomew Green, (Note: Bartholomew was the son of Samuel Green and printer for the Boston News-Letter) and was considered a good workman, industrious and earnest in his business manner. For many years he was a printer to the Province of Massachusetts Bay government and council, printing their laws, acts charters and journals and other legal documents. Sometime before 1740 Kneeland took on Daniel Fowle as an apprentice, who went on to become a successful printer. (Note: Fowle went on to publish American Magazine and Historical Chronicle and The Independent Advertiser, founded by Samuel Adams.)

Kneeland, proposed to add a number of new features in his practice of journalism, including the introduction of an organized corps of correspondents of "the most knowing and ingenious gentlemen in several noted towns", to seek out and gather news. He also made proposed to publish on a weekly basis "the Number of Persons Buried and Baptized in the town of Boston". He also published a good number of journalistic essays. He arranged for financial support from notable people of the town, including Mather Byles, Judge Danforth, Governor Burnet, and the Reverend Thomas Prince, of the Old South Church, of which Kneeland was a member.

Shortly after Kneeland established his printing shop he began printing religious books and pamphlets, for himself and for booksellers, before and during his partnership with Timothy Green, son of the elder Timothy Green. (Note: Religious enthusiasm and the need for more bibles and other religious literature is what fostered the advent of printing in the colonies.) In 1726 Samuel Willard authored a massive work entitled A compleat body of divinity in two hundred and fifty expository lectures ... and commissioned Kneeland and Bartholomew Green to have the work printed, with its title page printed in rubrication.

Kneeland & Green in 1727 printed the earliest known surviving example of The New England Primer, a religious text used in public schools for over two centuries. Historian Paul Leicester Ford believed that the first edition of The New England Primer was printed by Benjamin Harris in Boston, but examples of his printing are not known to exist. (Note: Kneeland & Green's surviving copy is in slightly defective condition and is housed in the New York Public Library (Lenox collection).)

=== Religious works ===
In 1752 Kneeland and Green, commissioned by Daniel Henchman, (Note: Henchman was a prominent Boston publisher and bookseller who, with his partners, built the first paper mill in New England.) one of Kneeland's principle customers, printed an edition of the King James Bible that was the first Bible printed in America in the English language. Because the British Crown owned the printing rights on the King James Bible it was illegal to print this bible in America. Subsequently, the printing was conducted as privately as possible and bore the same London imprint of the edition from which it was copied, to avoid prosecution. In the process Kneeland was printing the first Bible ever produced from the Boston Press. (Note: Aside from the requirement for printers to obtain official licenses for printing, the Crown also had authority over many aspects of the bible. i.e.Printing any sort of preamble or introductory literature in the Bible was also not allowed.) The Kneeland and Green Bible was almost impossible to distinguish from the official English printings, as the type, paper, inks used in its production were all imported from England. There are no known surviving Kneeland & Green bibles, even though they had to be printed in appreciable numbers to make such a printing project commercially worthwhile. This Bible is considered Kneeland's most important work, though it was not recognized as such until after the revolution when it was legally safe to acknowledge its printer.

The first religious newspaper in the world, a weekly entitled The Christian History, was established by Reverend Thomas Prince, of Boston, whose son, Thomas Jr. was the editor who commissioned Kneeland & Green in 1743 to conduct its printing. In its time it received much criticism and was only published for two years, but it remained an authoritative account (Note: The work is highly prized by historians of New England for that period, not only for its rarity, but for its biographical accounts, obituaries and other facts.) in many aspects thereafter.

=== Boston Gazette and Weekly Journal ===
On December 21, 1719 The Boston Gazette, the second newspaper established in the colonies, made its first appearance. The Gazette throughout its history was distinguished for the spirited and often controversial political essays it offered. It was originally printed by James Franklin for William Brooker, its founder, but was given to Kneeland after a few months in 1720. By October the heading indicated: "Printed by S. Kneeland for Philip Musgrave, Post Master, at his Office in Corn-Hill." This arrangement continued until 1726, when it was printed for Thomas Lewis, Boston's Postmaster. In 1727, Bartholomew Green took over the printing for Henry Marshall, another Postmaster. Marshall died in 1732, and John Boydell became the publisher, and the printing once again was done by Kneeland.

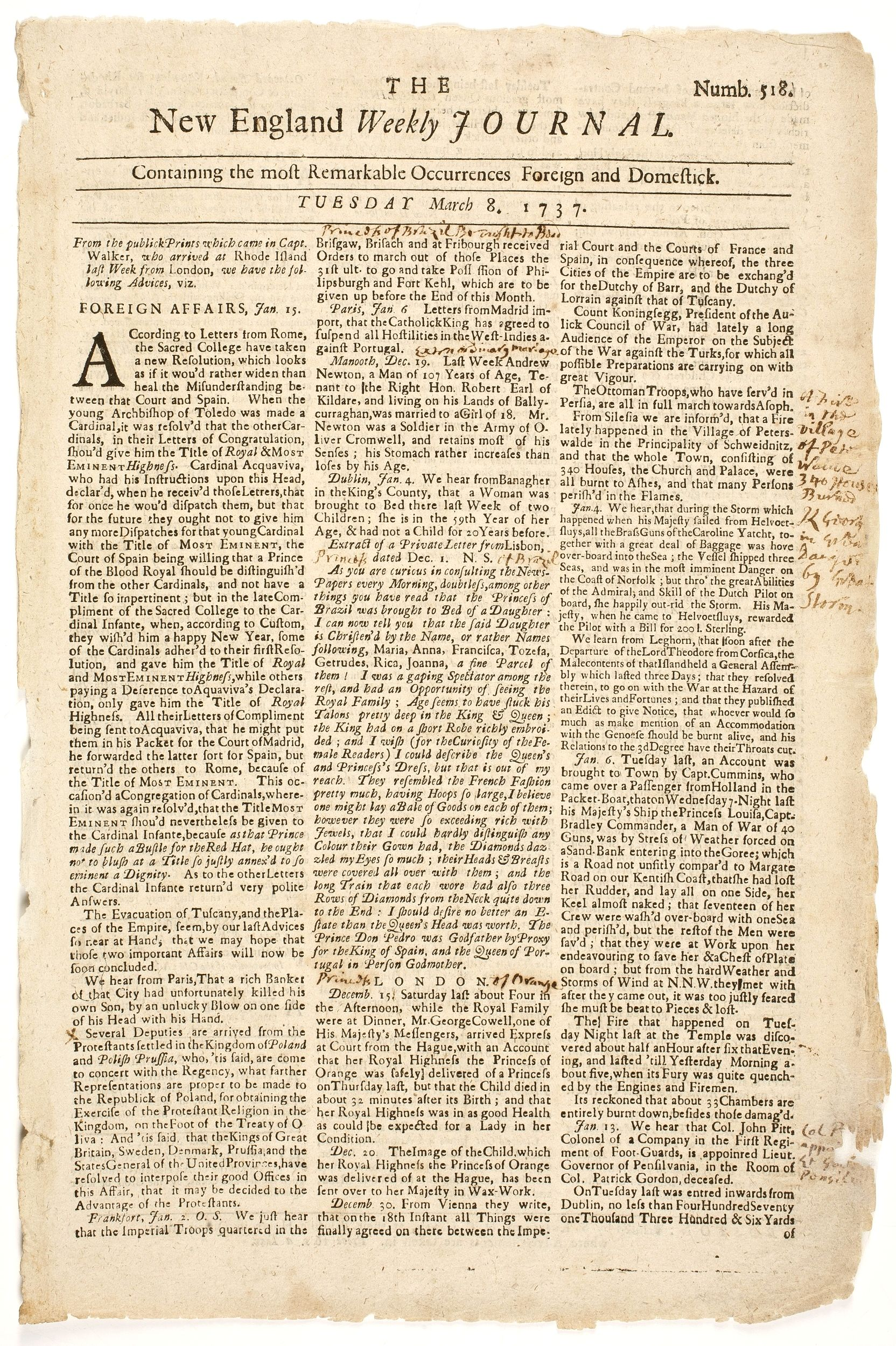
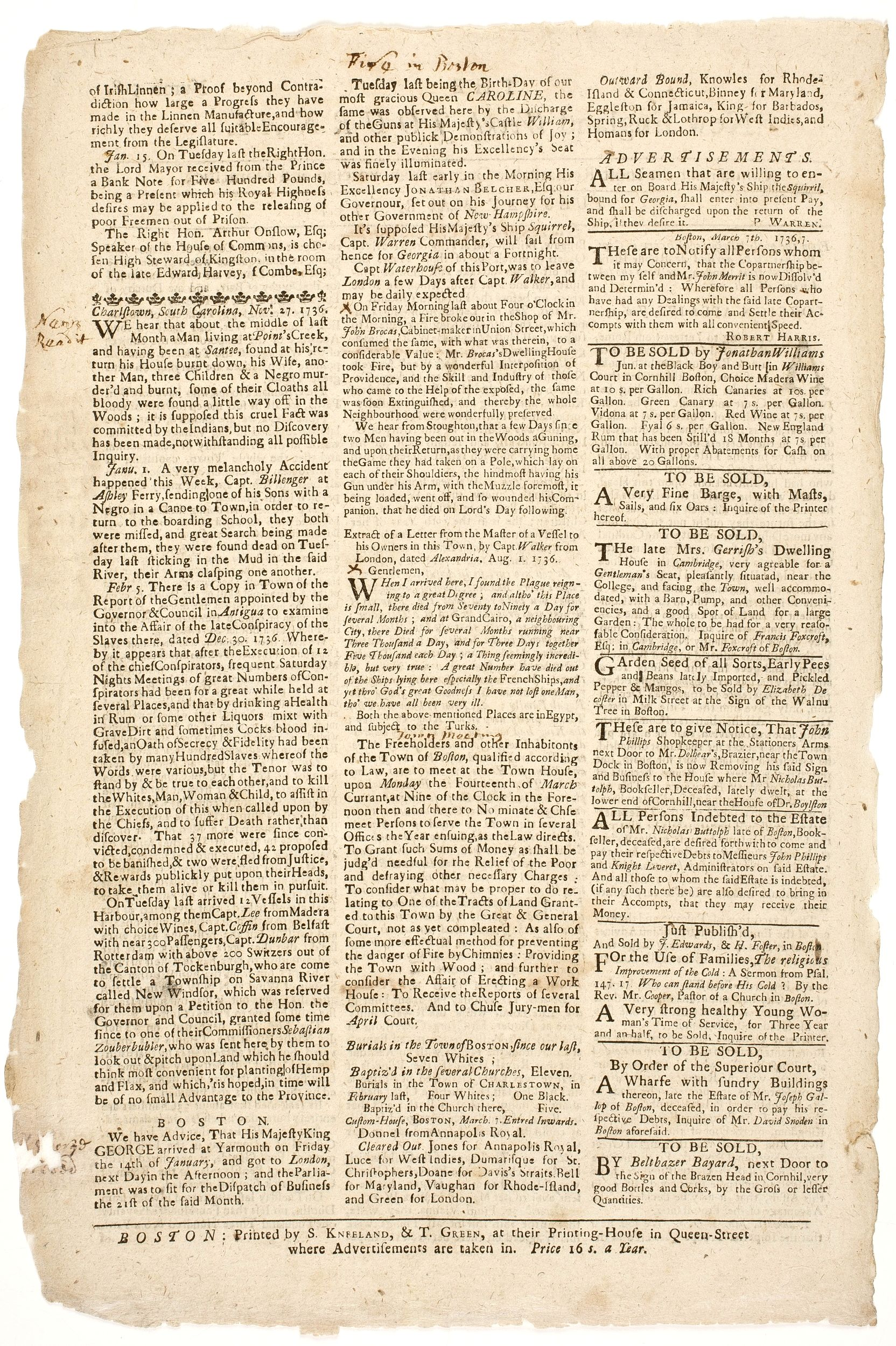
The New England Weekly Journal, March 8, 1737,
with the Kneeland & Green inscription at the bottom of page two

Kneeland, went on to establish The New England Weekly Journal, published on Mondays, with its first issue appearing on March 20, 1727, along with the inscription, "Containing the most Remarkable Occurrences Foreign and Domestick" below the title. It was the fourth newspaper to appear in the colonies. At this time Kneeland proposed a number of improvements to journalism and newspaper editing, including the organization of a corps of correspondents from different towns to share the latest news from each. A few months after, Kneeland formed a partnership with Timothy Green, (Note: Benjamin Green was Kneeland's uncle and the father of Timothy Green, the brother of Mary Green, daughter of Samuel Green, one of the first printers that arrived in the colonies from England. Timothy was a close friend and associate of Benjamin Franklin, and for a short period was in partnership with his elder brother, James Franklin.) father of Jonas Green, and established the printing firm of Kneeland and Green. Their partnership continued for twenty-five years. In 1736 they were commissioned to print and publish Thomas Prince's Chronological History of New England. By 1737 the Weekly Journal devoted itself more to the news than it did with literary work, with much of the news culled from London newspapers, along with local Boston news and news accounts from other American colonies. Much of its news covered events that carried a more providential meaning. For example, the Weekly Journal covered the execution of Hugh Henderson, a habitual criminal, more than other newspapers. (Note: An account of Henderson’s jailhouse confession and repentance was the central theme of the newspaper’s coverage. A sermon and poem written for the event, was alsol published by Kneeland and Green.)

After John Boydell, the proprietor of The Boston Gazette died, his heirs sold the paper for a modest sum to Kneeland and Green in 1741. They combined it with their Weekly Journal, and began publication of the Gazette under the new title of The Boston Gazette and Weekly Journal. The Journal was published for twenty-five years until the dissolution of their partnership, in 1752.

Thereafter Kneeland opened a bookstore, and the printing of the Weekly Journal was managed by Green. After a few years he gave up his bookstore, and returned to the printing shop. After twenty-five years they dissolved their partnership, and Kneeland managed the business on his own. Not long after the dissolution of their partnership, Kneeland ceased publication of The Boston Gazette and Weekly Journal. A few months later he established another paper entitled The Boston Gazette and Weekly Advertiser in 1753.

In 1740 Boston had only four printing houses, belonging to John Draper, Rogers & Fowle, Thomas Fleet and Kneeland & Green. Three of them printed and edited their own newspapers: Draper, with the Boston News-Letter, Fleet with the Boston Evening-Post, while Kneeland & Green printed and edited the New-England Weekly Journal.

=== Pre American Revolution ===
During the years approaching the American Revolution, most of Kneeland's printing contracts were with the Massachusetts General Court and Assembly. Between 1742 and 1759 he printed the Acts and Laws of the Great and General Court and Assembly, in numerous volumes, and the various charters. By 1759 he appealed for additional money for continuing in this great task, yet to be completed, claiming that inflation had increased the overall costs of printing the laws beyond the original twelve shillings a book previously agreed upon with the legislative committee in charge of printing. After considering Kneelan's situation and request in February 1763, the committee granted £50 paid on Kneeland's account. Early in January of the next year, Kneeland was back with a second request for additional funds. His complaint this time was that while the general court had ordered a new impression of the temporary laws from another printer, he left with a hundred obsolete law book which "..became as waste Paper", and was a burden he is not prepared to deal with. After a postponement the committee granted him another £100. Eventually he lost most of his government printing contracts because other printers were charging less. While he was charging 25 or 26 shillings a sheet, Green and Russell were offering to do the work for 20 shillings. Subsequently, Kneeland ended up bankrupt and retired in 1765. He died on a Thursday, December 14, 1769, at the age of 73, leaving four sons, who were all printers. A widely esteemed member of the Boston community, Kneeland's funeral was attended by a very large gathering the following Saturday.

=== Works printed by Kneeland ===
Aside from newspaper publishing, Kneeland, often with his partner Timothy Green, printed bibles and a wide assortment of books and pamphlets, many of which were of a religious or spiritual nature. He also was commissioned as the official printer for over two decades printing the laws, acts and charters for the Massachusetts General Court and Assembly. In Charles Evans' works of 1803–1805, American Bibliography, volumes 1, 2 and 3, he outlines several hundred works printed by Kneeland himself, or in partnership as Kneeland & Green.

Selected works

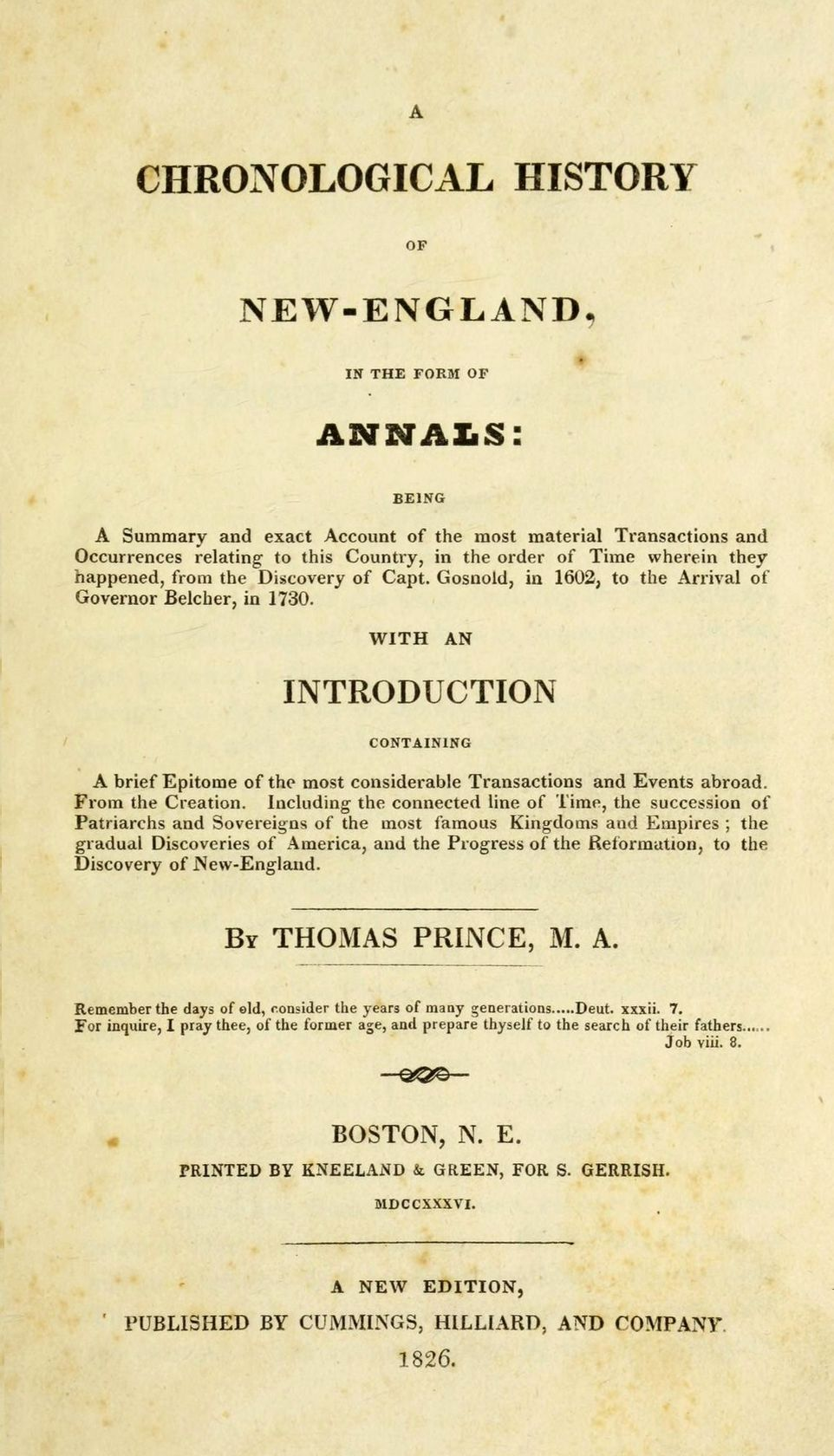
A chronological history of New-England, by Thomas Prince, 1736, printed by Kneeland and Green, Boston

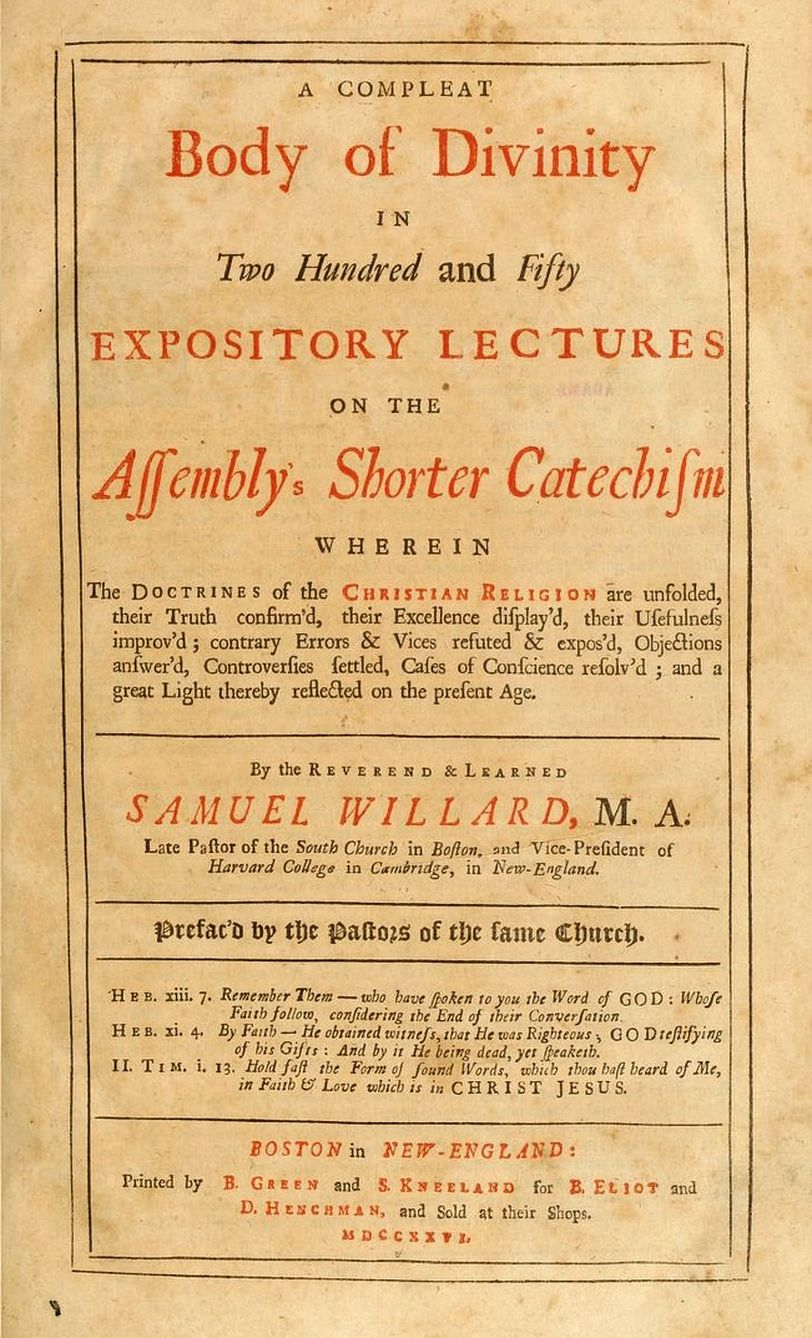
Williard's Compleat Body of Divinity, printed by Samuel Kneeland and Timothy Green in 1726, for Daniel Henchman

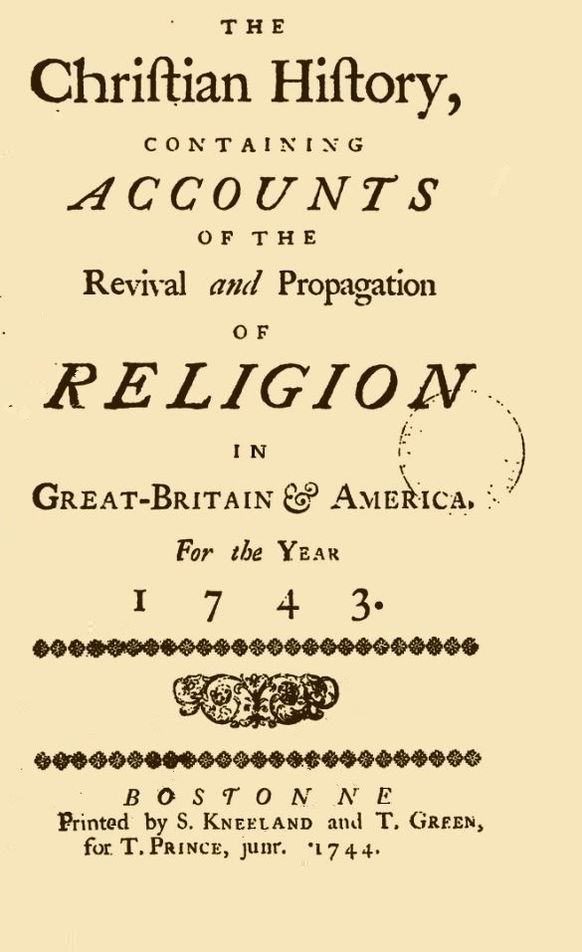
Christian History, 1743; first weekly about Christianity published in America, printed by Kneeland & Green, 1743

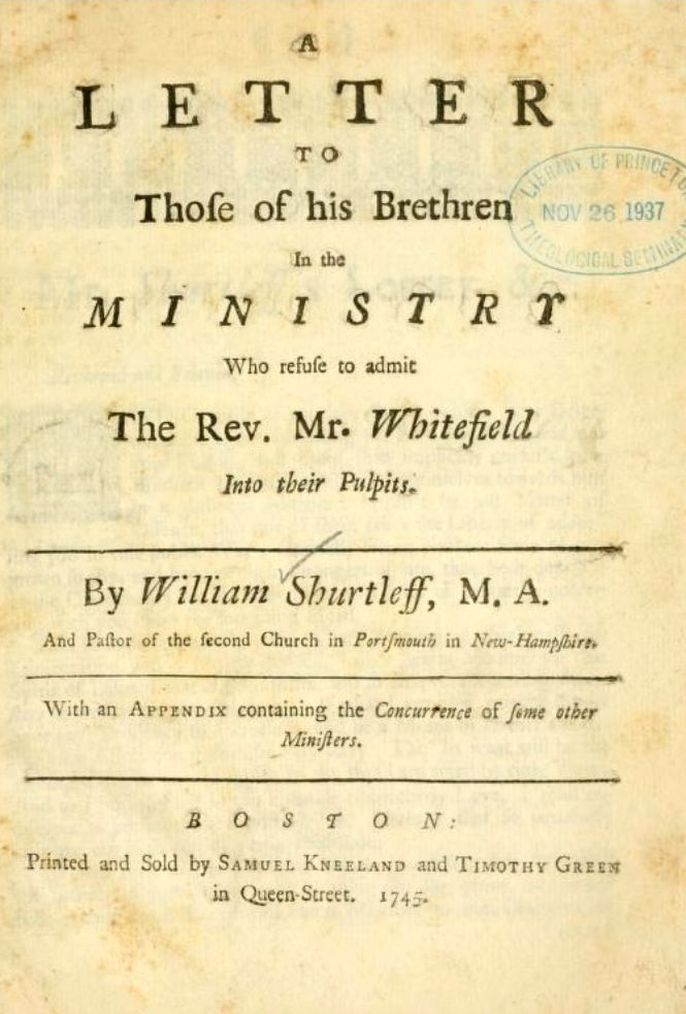
Letter by William Shurtless, printed by Kneeland and Green, 1745 Sample of printing woodcuts, p. 3

Evans, volumes 1, 2 and 3, lists more than 300 different works printed by Kneeland, or in partnership as Kneeland and Green. In particular, he lists many works they printed by the once acclaimed Reverend Thomas Prince, and by other ministers and clergymen. Below is a selection of works printed by Kneeland, depicting the general nature of the subjects involved:

- The Book of Psalms (1718)
- Mather, Cotton (1719). An Heavenly Life
- Mather, Cotton (1719). A Testimony against evil customs
- Coleman, Benjamin (1730). Dying in Peace in a Good Old Age
- Thatcher, Peter (1730). Man's frailty Practically Exhibited in his Life and Death
- Baxter, Richard (1731). A Call to the Unconverted to Turn and Live ...
- Edwards, Jonathan (1731). God Glorified in the Work of Redemption
- Greenwood, John (1731). The Temple of God to be Measur'd by his Ministers, According to the Word, as its Rule ...
- Loring, Samuel (1731). Ministers must Certainly and Shortly Die
- "A Lover of his Country" (1731). The Sinews of Trade. The State of the Province of Massachusetts
- Prince, Thomas (1731). The Vade Mecum for America: Or a companion for Traders and Travellers
- Dexter, Samuel (1738). Our Father's God, The Hope of Prosterity
- Dickinson, Jonathan (1738). The Reasonableness of Nonconformity to the Church of England, in Point of Worship
- Emerson, Joseph (1735). Meat out of the Eater, and Swiftness of the Strong
- Prince, Thomas (1735). Precious in the Sight of the Lord is the Death of His Saints
- Prince, Thomas (1736). A chronological history of New-England in the form of annals
- Loring, Israel (1738). False Hopes Discovered. A Sermon Preached at Concord
- Rand, William (1739). The Minister's Duty to Preach the Pure Word of God
- Chanler, Isaac (1740). New Converts Exhorted to Cleave to the Lord
- Ashley, Jonanthan (1742). The United Endeavors and earnest Prayers of Ministers and People, to Promote the Great Design of Ministry
- Prince, Thomas (1744). The Christian History, Containing Accounts of the revival and Propagation of Religion in Great-Britain and America
- Prince, Thomas (1748). The Fullness of Life and Joy in the Presence of God
- Prince, Thomas (1750). The Nature and Moral Government and Agency of God in causing Droughts and Rains
- Kneeland and Green (1752). King James Bible, the first Bible printed in English to appear in the colonies
- Massachusetts Bay, Province (1753–1759). Acts and Laws, Passed by the Great and General Court and Assembly, in numerous volumes

== See also ==
- Early American publishers and printers
- List of early American publishers and printers
- History of printing
- History of journalism
- History of American newspapers
- Newspapers of colonial America

== Bibliography ==
- Amory, Hugh; Hall, David D., eds. (2009) [2007]. A History of the Book in America: Volume 1: The Colonial Book in the Atlantic World. University of North Carolina Press for the American Antiquarian Society. ISBN 978-0-8078-68003.
- Buckingham, Joseph Tinker (1850). Specimens of newspaper literature : with personal memoirs, anecdotes, and reminiscences. Vol. V.1. Boston : Charles C. Little and James Brown.
- Drake, Samuel Gardner (1856). The history & antiquities of Boston : from its settlement in 1630, to the year 1770. Boston : Luther Stevens.
- Evans, Charles (1803). American Bibliography : a chronological dictionary of all books, pamphlets and periodical publications printed in the United States of America, 1639–1729. Vol. V I. Chicago : Privately printed for the author by the Blakely Press.
- —— (1804). American Bibliography : a chronological dictionary of all books, pamphlets and periodical publications printed in the United States of America, 1730–1750. Vol. V II. Chicago : Privately printed for the author by the Blakely Press.
- —— (1805). American Bibliography : a chronological dictionary of all books, pamphlets and periodical publications printed in the United States of America1751-1764. Vol. V III. Chicago : Privately printed for the author by the Blakely Press.
- Hudson, Frederic (1873). Journalism in the United States, from 1690 to 1872. New York, Harper & Brothers.
- Kneeland, Stillman Foster (1897). Seven centuries in the Kneeland family. New York : Published by the author.
- Moore, John Weeks (1886). Moore's Historical, Biographical, and Miscellaneous Gatherings, in the form of disconnected notes relative to printers, printing, publishing, and editing of books, newspapers, magazines. Concord, N.H., Printed by the Republican press association.
- Newgass, Edgar (1958). An outline of Anglo-American Bible history. London : B.T. Batsford.
- Prince, Thomas (1736). A chronological history of New-England. Boston: Kneeland & Green.
- Roden, Robert F. (1905). The Cambridge Press, 1638–1692; a history of the first printing press established in English America. New York: Dodd, Mead and Company.
- Thomas, Isaiah (1874). The history of printing in America, with a biography of printers. Vol. I. New York, B. Franklin.
- Wroth, Lawrence C. (1922). A History of Printing in Colonial Maryland, 1686–1776. Baltimore : Typothetae of Baltimore.
- Willard, Samuel (1726). A compleat body of divinity in two hundred and fifty expository lectures. Boston in New-England : Printed by B. Green and S. Kneeland for B. Eliot and D. Henchman.
- Yodelis, Mary Ann (1975). Who Paid the Piper?Publishing Economics in Boston, 1763–1775 (PDF). Association for Education in Journalism.
- "Samuel Kneeland". Proceedings of the American Academy of Arts and Sciences. 24. American Academy of Arts & Sciences: 438–441. May 1888. JSTOR 20021577.
- Yeager, Jonathan M. "Samuel Kneeland of Boston: Colonial Bookseller, Printer, and Publisher". academia.edu. Jonathan M. Yeager.
- "About this Newspaper: The Boston Gazette, Or, New England Weekly Journal, Boston Mass., 1741-1741". Library of Congress.
- "The News Media and the Making of America, 1730-1865; The New England Weekly Journal". American Antiquarian Society.
- Wilson, J. G.; Fiske, J., eds. (1892). "Kneeland, Samuel (printer)" . Appletons' Cyclopædia of American Biography. New York: D. Appleton.
