= Daniel Henchman (publisher) =

18th century American publisher and bookseller

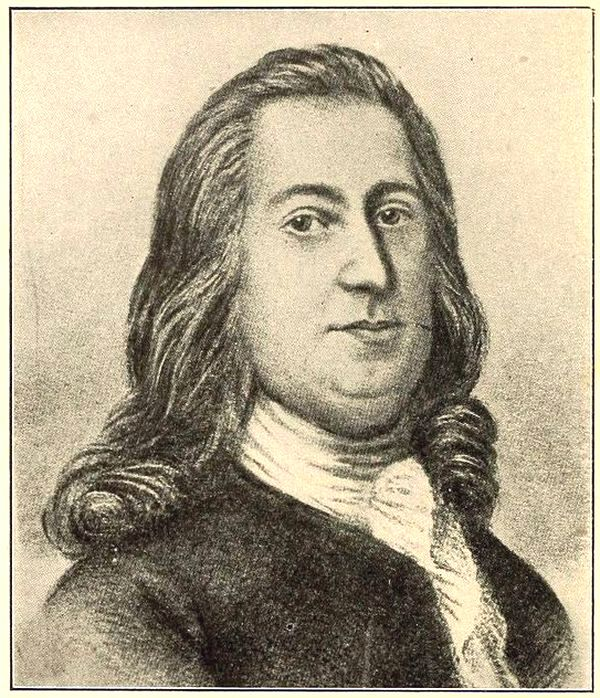
- Born: January 21, 1689; Boston, Colony of Massachusetts, Kingdom of England
- Died: February 25, 1761 (aged 72); Boston, Colony of Massachusetts, Kingdom of Great Britain
- Occupations: Publisher; bookseller

Daniel Henchman (January 21, 1689 – February 25, 1761) was a publisher and bookseller in 18th-century colonial Boston. Aside from his mainstay of publishing, printing, and bookselling, he was involved in a variety of mercantile pursuits. He was also very involved in Boston's civic matters and gave generously to the poor fund through his church. He was also an officer in a Boston militia regiment. Primarily through Henchman's efforts, the first paper mill to appear in New England was built in Massachusetts. Some historians consider Henchman to be the most prominent publisher and bookseller in pre-Revolutionary New England.

== Early life and family ==
Henchman Coat of Arms

Daniel Henchman was born in Boston on January 21, 1689. He was the son of Hezekiah and Abigail Henchman, and grandson of Captain Daniel Henchman (1623–1685), who emigrated to New England from London, and who was a captain in the New England Confederation who served with distinction in King Philip's War (1675–78). Henchman had a daughter, Lydia, who married Thomas Hancock, who left his estate to his nephew, John Hancock, (Note: Their marriage would explain why some of Henchman's business records are part of the John Hancock Papers, now in the Baker Library, Graduate School of Business Administration, Harvard University. John Hancock was one of the signatories of the Declaration of Independence) the renowned Patriot. As a young man, Thomas worked as a clerk in Henchman's bookstore.

== Civic life ==
Henchman lived on Queen Street (Note: Later renamed Court Street) in what was the Brattle Street Society's parsonage, which was later willed to that society by his daughter, Mrs. Hancock. He was very involved in Boston's civic and other affairs. He was a clerk of the market in 1716 selling produce, seafood and wine, and spirits. He was an incorporator of Boston's Fire Society in 1717 and a member of a militia company in Boston in 1722, 1726, and 1727. In 1735, he returned to militia duty and ultimately advanced to the rank of Lieutenant Colonel. He functioned in Boston's Overseers of the Poor from 1735 to 1756. Henchman was appointed a justice of the peace on January 26, 1738–9, and was again appointed on September 14, 1756. He was also a Deacon of the Old South Church for a number of years.

== Publisher and bookseller ==
In 1711, soon after Henchman turned 21, he began selling books and stationery in Boston with great success and prestige. His well-known bookshop was located on the corner of State and Washington streets, which later was the same house where Henry Knox was brought up after his father died. Several historians have noted Henchman's enterprising and successful capacity as a publisher and bookseller, including Isaiah Thomas who maintained that "Henchman was the most eminent and enterprising bookseller that appeared in Boston, or, indeed, in all British America, before the year 1775."

Henchman often employed the printing services of Samuel Kneeland and Timothy Green, and once commissioned them to print the first English-language Bible to appear in British America. (Note: Since the British Crown owned the printing rights on the King James Bible it was illegal for any printer to print this bible in America without royal authorization.) As such, the printing had to be performed as privately as possible and bore the same London imprint of the edition from which it was copied, to avoid prosecution. He also employed various other printers in Boston. Henchman's business expenses, involvements, and relations with various printers are covered in great detail in Rollo G. Silver's work, Publishing in Boston, 1726–1757: the accounts of Daniel Henchman, published in 1956.

The first paper mill to be established north of New Jersey grew out of the action of the Massachusetts Assembly of 1728. Henchman was the senior promoter whose initiative was probably the cause of the Assembly's action, joined with Gillam Phillips, Benjamin Faneuil, Thomas Hancock, and Henry Deering and built a paper manufactory at Milton on the Neponset River sometime in the year 1729. More than twenty years before, a mill with a raceway had been built on the Milton side of the Neponset, some eight miles upstream from Boston. Henchman and his associates leased and converted it into a paper mill and added an adjoining house for their workmen. The upper story housed a loft used for the drying of paper. By 1731 Henchman provided to the general court in Boston a sample sheet of paper made at his mill, though the mill was already in production before this time. Though it was initially slow in getting started, the mill soon proved to be so successful an operation that it was often referred to in official correspondence, newspapers, and other publications of the time as a much-needed establishment. (Note: There was a paper shortage throughout all the colonies, which worsened as more printing presses and newspapers began to appear, and which ultimately became serious when relations with the mother country were strained as the revolution drew near.)

== Final years ==
Before his death Henchman made out a will leaving a significant sum to the poor fund of the Old South Church, where for many years he served as a deacon. His wife was deceased, he left his estate to his daughter Lydia and her husband, Thomas Hancock. Henchman died in Boston on February 25, 1761, at the age of 72. His obituary appeared in The Boston Gazette and Country Journal on March 2, 1761. Though he was no longer an officer in the Boston militia regiment, Henchman's funeral procession was escorted by Captain Dawes and other officers of the Boston regiment.

== See also ==
- List of early American publishers and printers
- History of printing

== Bibliography ==
- Drake, Samuel Gardner (1856). The history and antiquities of Boston . Boston, Luther Stevens.
- Newgass, Edgar (1958). An outline of Anglo-American Bible history. London : B.T. Batsford.
- Roberts, Oliver Ayer (1895). History of the Military company of the Massachusetts ... 1637–1888. Vol. I. Boston, Alfred Mudge & son, printers.
- Silver, Rollo G. (1960). "Government Printing in Massachusetts, 1751–1801". Studies in Bibliography. 16. Bibliographical Society of the University of Virginia: 161–200. JSTOR 40371358.
- Silver, Rollo G. (1956). Publishing in Boston, 1726–1757: the accounts of Daniel Henchman (PDF). American Antiquarian Society. Open Library
- Thomas, Isaiah (1874). The history of printing in America, with a biography of printers. Vol. I. New York, B. Franklin.
- —— (1874). The history of printing in America, with a biography of printers. Vol. II. New York, B. Franklin.
- Weeks, Lyman Horace (1916). A history of paper-manufacturing in the United States, 1690–1916. New York, The Lockwood trade journal company.
- Wroth, Lawrence C. (1938). The Colonial Printer. Portland, Me., The Southworth-Anthoensen press.
- Overseers of the Poor, Committee of the Board (1866). A manual for the use of the Overseer of the poor in the city of Boston. Boston : J.E. Farewell and company, printers to the city.
- "Henchman, Daniel, 1623–1685". The Native Northeast Research Collaborative. 2019.
