= Jeremiah Gridley =

American politician

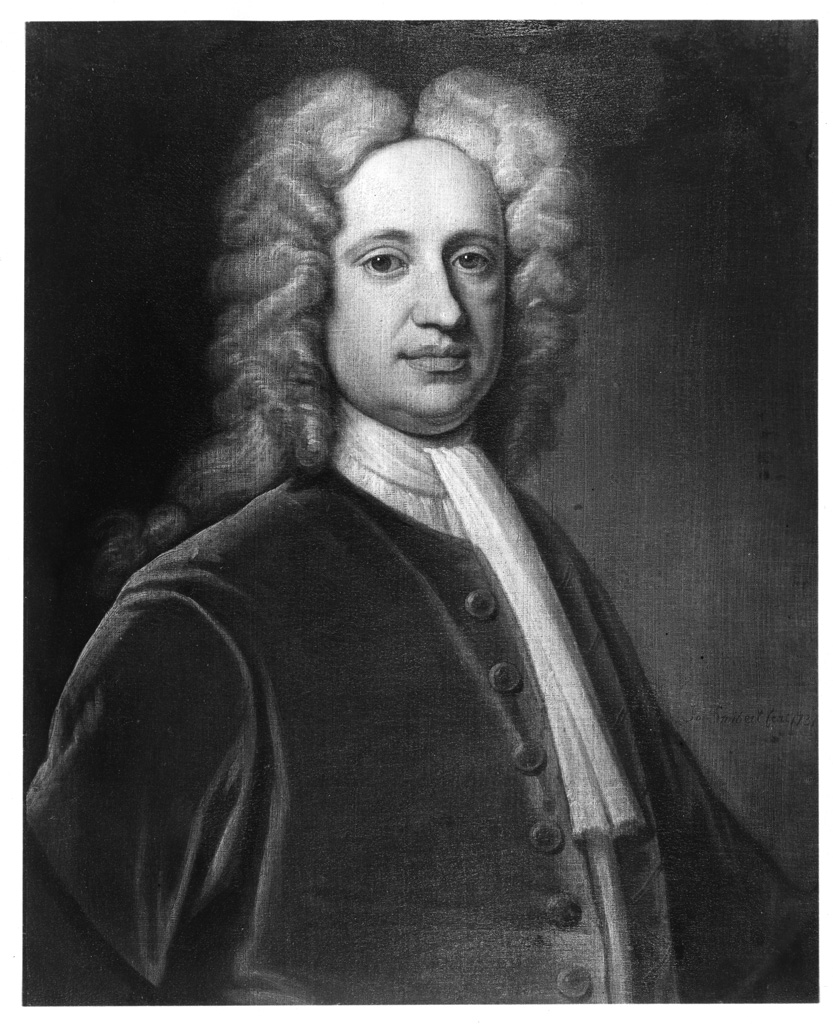
- Portrait of Jeremiah Gridley by John Smibert, 1731 (Harvard University)

Massachusetts Attorney General

Member of the General Court of the Province of Massachusetts Bay
- In office 1755–1757

Personal details
- Born: March 10, 1702 Boston, Province of Massachusetts Bay
- Died: September 10, 1767 (aged 65) Massachusetts, U.S.
- Resting place: Granary Burying Ground, Boston, Massachusetts, U.S.
- Education: Harvard College (class of 1725)

Jeremiah Gridley (or Jeremy Gridley; 1702–1767) was a lawyer, editor, colonial legislator, and attorney general in Boston, Province of Massachusetts Bay, in the 18th century. He served as "Grand Master of the Masons in North America" around the 1760s, and was associated with the founding of the Boston Bar Association.

== Biography ==
Born in 1702 in Boston to Richard Gridley (born 1684) and Rebecca Gridley, Jeremiah attended Harvard College (class of 1725); classmates included Mather Byles. Gridley married Abigail Lewis around 1730. In the 1730s he edited The Weekly Rehearsal, a literary magazine.

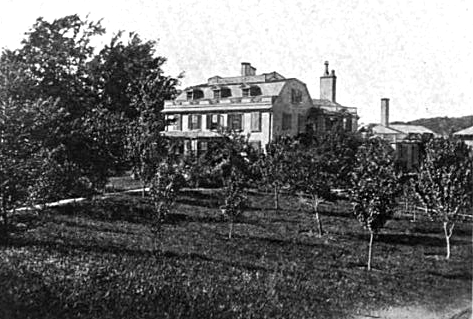
Gridley house (built 1740) in Brookline, Massachusetts, as it appeared in the 19th century

He practiced law in Boston. As a lawyer he trained John Adams, William Cushing, James Otis, Benjamin Pratt, and Oxenbridge Thacher. In 1761 "he defended the 'writs of assistance,' for which the custom house officers had applied to the superior court, and which authorized them to enter houses under suspicion of obtaining smuggled goods, at their own discretion. Gridley had for an antagonist in this case the celebrated patriot, James Otis."

"He was moderator of the town of Brookline 1759, 1760, and 1761, ... representative to the General Court for 1755, 1756, and 1757, and Attorney General in 1767." He also belonged to the Boston Marine Society.

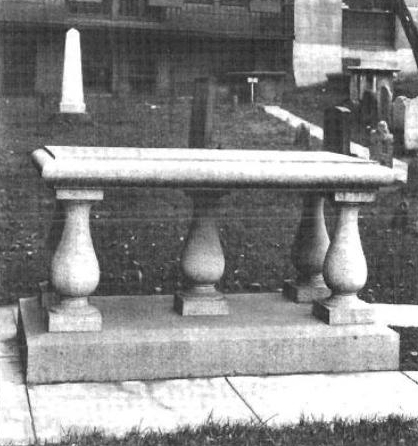
Monument to Jeremy Gridley (1702-1767) in Granary Burying Ground, Boston

Gridley died in 1767, and was buried in the Granary Burying Ground. A memorial was built for his grave in 1916 by the Masons of Massachusetts in honor of Gridley's contribution to Freemasonry.

Legal offices
Preceded by Edmund Trowbridge	Attorney General of Massachusetts; 1767	Succeeded by Vacant
