= Bartholomew Green Jr. =

Bartholomew Green Jr. (1699 or 1701 – October 29, 1751) was a son of Bartholomew Green, a colonial American printer of the Boston News-Letter — They were the son and grandson of Samuel Green, respectively.

Green married Hannah Hammond in 1724 and they had five children. He apprenticed with his father until he went on his own in 1725. Almost immediately he began printing the Boston Gazette which was a rival to his father's Boston News-Letter. He continued to print this newspaper until 1732. He also worked with the firm of Bushell, Allen and Green and developed a reputation for high quality printing.

A commission in the British army in 1744 appears to have adversely affected his business and in 1751 Green moved to Halifax, Nova Scotia to start a printing office. This became the first printing office in what is now Canada but Green died before it went into newspaper production. One of his partners, John Bushell, actually started the paper that Bartholomew had planned. It was named the Halifax Gazette.

Green died at Halifax and it appears that his two sons, who were printers, were never involved in the Halifax operation. Green's daughter Mary was the mother of Joseph Dennie.

== Sources ==
- Ellis, Milton (1915). Joseph Dennie and His Circle: A Study in American Literature From 1792-1812. Bulletin of the University of Texas. "Joseph Dennie and His Circle: A Study in American Literature From 1792-1812."
- Thomas, Isaiah (1874). The history of printing in America, with a biography of printers. Vol. I. New York, B. Franklin.
