= Clyde A. Duniway =

American educator and academic administrator

Clyde Augustus Duniway
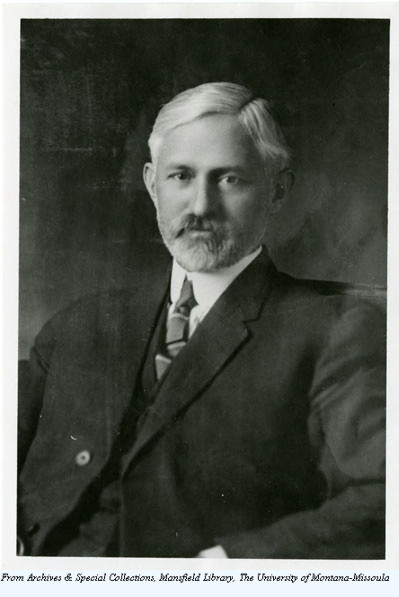
- President of the University of Montana
- Born: November 2, 1866; Albany, Oregon
- Died: December 24, 1944 (aged 78); Santa Clara, California
- Education: Cornell University; Harvard University
- Scientific career
- Fields: Philosophy

Clyde Augustus Duniway (November 2, 1866 – December 24, 1944) was an American educator and academic administrator who served as the president of the University of Montana from 1908 to 1912, the University of Wyoming from 1912 to 1917, and Colorado College from 1917 to 1924.

== Education and early career ==
He was born November 2, 1866, to Benjamin Charles Duniway and Abigail Scott Duniway in Albany, Oregon. He attended Cornell University and received his A.B. in 1892, and earned his A.M. in 1894 and Ph.D. in 1897, both from Harvard University.

After receiving his doctorate, Duniway became an instructor of history at both Harvard University and Radcliffe College. He took an associate professor position at Stanford University and became a full professor in 1908.

== Accomplishments as President of the University of Montana ==
During the course of Duniway's administration at Montana, the number of UM students rose from 105 to 203. In a move to have students take full responsibility for their actions, Duniway abolished the "conduct rules." He established new admittance and course standards in accordance with the National Association of State Universities. He also created strict eligibility rules for student athletes. Duniway sought to increase the educational level for students and the salaries for UM faculty. The number of student activities on campus increased, including new organizations such as the Debate League, YMCA, YWCA, and the Silent Sentinel.

== Later career ==
Duniway was dismissed from his post at Montana in 1912. He went on to serve as the president of the University of Wyoming from 1912 to 1917 and as the president of Colorado College from 1917 to 1924. After leaving Colorado College he served as director of the British Division of the American University in Europe and then was appointed professor of history at Carleton College, where he remained until his retirement in 1937.
