= Boston Evening-Post =

Newspaper published in Massachusetts, US

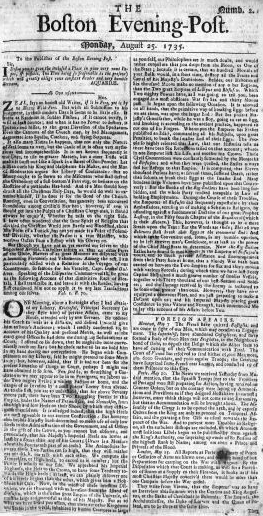
Boston Evening-Post, 1735

The Boston Evening-Post (August 18, 1735 – April 24, 1775) was a newspaper printed in Boston, Massachusetts, in the 18th century. Publishers included Thomas Fleet (d.1758), Thomas Fleet Jr. (d.1797), and John Fleet (d.1806).

== See also ==
- The Weekly Rehearsal, predecessor to the Boston Evening-Post
