= Frederic Hudson =

United States journalist

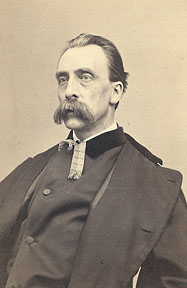
- Born: April 25, 1819; Quincy, Massachusetts
- Died: October 21, 1875 (aged 56); Concord, Massachusetts
- Occupation: Newspaper editor
- Spouse: Eliza Woodward Hudson (1818-1876)
- Children: Woodward Hudson (1858-1938)
- Parent(s): Barzillai Hudson and Rebecca Eaton Hudson

Frederic Hudson (April 25, 1819 – October 21, 1875) was a leading 19th century American newspaper editor, working from 1838 to 1866 for New York Herald, where he served as managing editor, and was influential in the development of American journalism.

== Biography ==
Hudson was born in Quincy, Massachusetts, in 1819, and attended the town school in Concord, Massachusetts. When he was 17, he moved to New York City, where his brothers had opened "Hudson's News Room". In 1836, he there met James Gordon Bennett Sr., who had founded the Herald in 1835, and soon went to work for him, becoming the third full-time employee of the paper.

Hudson was known for his diligent pursuit of news and attention to detail, and was eventually named as managing editor by Bennett. For example, instead of waiting for ships to arrive at the dock to pick up their news, he sent out boats he meet ships to get the news faster. He pursued detailed coverage of the Civil War, hiring over sixty-three correspondents. During Hudson's tenure, the paper developed from a local institution to a complex and far-ranging national organization.

Hudson was also left solely in charge of the paper when Bennett would travel for extended periods, and the paper's circulation grew to become largest read daily paper in the United States by the time of the Civil War.

In 1866, Hudson retired, and moved with his wife, who was in ill-health (along with their son Woodward) to Concord, Massachusetts. (Bennett's son, James Gordon Bennett Jr., took over the running of the paper.)

In 1873, Hudson published a history of American newspapers, Journalism in the United States, from 1690 to 1872, which became the authoritative text on the development of American journalism.

Hudson died on October 21, 1875, from injuries suffered when he fell from a horse carriage that was struck by railroad cars at a crossing in Concord.

His New York Herald obituary described him as "the father of American journalism, so far as enterprise, sagacity and boldness in gathering news are concerned."

== Sources ==
- Hudson, Frederic (1873). Journalism in the United States, from 1690 to 1872. New York, Harper & Brothers.
