= Education in the Thirteen Colonies =

American historical education systems

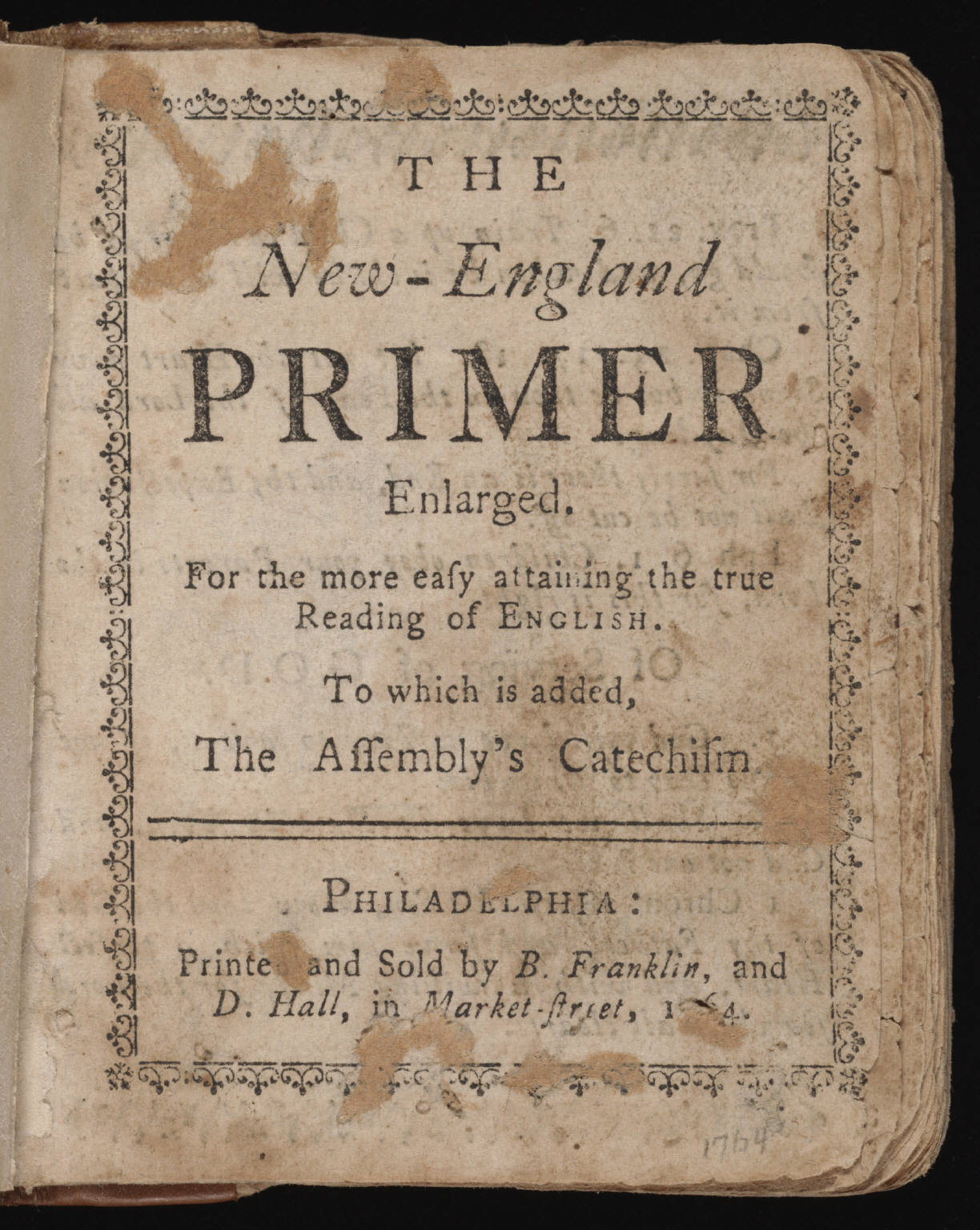
The New England Primer was the first and most popular primer designed to teach reading in the colonies.

Education in the Thirteen Colonies during the 17th and 18th centuries varied considerably. Public school systems existed only in New England. In the 18th century, the Puritan emphasis on literacy largely influenced the significantly higher literacy rate (70 percent of men) of the Thirteen Colonies, mainly New England, in comparison to Britain (40 percent of men) and France (29 percent of men).

How much education a child received depended on a person's social and family status. Families did most of the educating, and boys were favored. Educational opportunities were much sparser in the rural South.

The Puritans valued education, both for the sake of religious study (they demanded a great deal of Bible reading) and for the sake of citizens who could participate better in town meetings. A 1647 Massachusetts law mandated that every town of 50 or more families support a 'petty' (elementary) school and every town of 100 or more families support a Latin, or grammar, school where a few boys could learn Latin in preparation for college and the ministry or law. In practice, virtually all New England towns made an effort to provide some schooling for their children. Both boys and girls attended the elementary schools, and there they learned to read, write, cipher, and they also learned religion. The first Catholic school for both boys and girls was established by Father Theodore Schneider in 1743 in the town of Goshenhoppen, PA (present day Bally) and is still in operation. In the mid-Atlantic region, private and sectarian schools filled the same niche as the New England common schools.

The South, overwhelmingly rural, had few schools of any sort until the Revolutionary era. Wealthy children studied with private tutors; middle-class children might learn to read from literate parents or older siblings; many poor and middle-class white children, as well as virtually all black children, went unschooled. Literacy rates were significantly lower in the South than the north; this remained true until the late nineteenth century. Secondary schools were rare in the colonial era outside a handful of major towns. They generally emphasized Latin grammar, rhetoric, and advanced arithmetic with the goal of preparing boys to enter college.

== Young children ==
=== Dame schools ===
The Americans copied the dame school from the version that was popular in Great Britain. It was a private school taught by a woman for nearby boys and girls. The education provided by these schools ranged from basic to exceptional. The basic type of dame school was common in New England, where basic literacy was expected of all classes and where people lived close together in villages. It was less common in the southern colonies, where there were fewer educated women available as teachers, and where towns and villages were few and farms were so distant that the children could not easily walk there every day.

Motivated by the religious needs of Puritan society and their own economic needs, some colonial women in 17th century rural New England opened small, private schools in their homes to teach reading and catechism to young children. An education in reading and religion was required for children by the Massachusetts School Law of 1642. This law was later strengthened by the famous Old Deluder Satan Act. According to Puritan beliefs, Satan would try to keep people from understanding the Scriptures, therefore it was considered necessary that all children be taught how to read. Dame schools fulfilled this requirement when parents were unable to educate their young children in their own home. For a small fee, women, often housewives or widows, offered to take in children to whom they would teach a little writing, reading, basic prayers and religious beliefs. These women received "tuition" in coin, home industries, alcohol, baked goods and other valuables. Teaching materials generally included, and often did not exceed, a hornbook, primer, Psalter and Bible. Both girls and boys were provided education through the dame school system. Dame schools generally focused on the four R's of education — Reading, Riting, Rithmetic, and Religion. In addition to primary education, girls in dame schools might also learn sewing, embroidery, and other "graces". Most girls received their only formal education from dame schools because of sex-segregated education in common or public schools during the colonial period. If their parents could afford it, after attending a dame school for a rudimentary education in reading, colonial boys moved on to grammar schools where a male teacher taught advanced arithmetic, writing, Latin and Greek.

In the 18th and 19th centuries, some dame schools offered boys and girls from wealthy families a "polite education". The women running these elite dame schools taught "reading, writing, English, French, arithmetic, music and dancing". Schools for upper-class girls were usually called "female seminaries" and "finishing schools" rather than "dame schools".

=== Teenagers ===
Secondary schools were rare in the colonial era outside major towns such as Boston, New York City, Philadelphia, and Charleston. Where they existed, secondary schools generally called "academies," were private schools that emphasized Latin grammar, rhetoric, and advanced arithmetic with the goal of preparing boys to enter college. Some secondary schools also taught practical subjects such as accounting, navigation, surveying, and modern languages. Some families sent their children to live and work with other families (often relatives or close friends) as a capstone to their education.

Few youth of the colonial era had access to secondary or higher education, but many benefited from various types of vocational education, especially apprenticeship. Both boys and girls were apprenticed for varying terms (up to fifteen years in the case of young orphans). In addition to the 3Rs, boys were typically taught a trade, and girls sewing and household management, . Of course, many children learned job skills from their parents or employers without embarking on a formal apprenticeship.

== Higher education ==
Colleges were set up on the British model with the goal of producing educated ministers and good citizens. The curriculum was heavily weighted to Latin and Greek, plus some mathematics. The faculties were small and electives were rare. Extra curricular activities such as clubs, fraternities, and sports were rare before 1800. All were private boarding schools. Except for the College of Philadelphia, each was sponsored by the locally dominant religious denomination.

The first colleges, not including pre-collegiate academies, were:

- New College in Massachusetts (subsequently Harvard University) (1636)
- College of William and Mary in Virginia (1693)
- Collegiate School in Connecticut (subsequently Yale University) (1701)
- College of New Jersey (subsequently Princeton University) (1746)
- King's College in New York (subsequently Columbia University) (1754)
- College of Philadelphia (subsequently the University of Pennsylvania) (1755)
- College of Rhode Island (subsequently Brown University) (1764)
- Queen's College in New Jersey (subsequently Rutgers University) (1766)
- Dartmouth College in New Hampshire (1769)

Only white males were admitted; some took students as young as 14 or 15, and most had some sort of preparatory academy for those who needed Latin or other basic skills. College faculties were generally very small, typically consisting of the college president (usually a clergyman), perhaps one or two professors, and several tutors, i.e. graduate students who earned their keep by teaching the underclassmen. All students followed the same course of study, which was of three or (more commonly) four years' duration. Collegiate studies focused on ancient languages, ancient history, theology, and mathematics. In the 18th century, science (especially astronomy and physics) and modern history and politics assumed a larger (but still modest) place in the college curriculum. Until the mid-18th century, most graduates became Protestant clergymen. Towards the end of the colonial period, law became another popular career choice for college graduates.

== French Louisiana ==
Louisiana was founded by France in the 1680, and New Orleans was established in 1718. In the 1760s, there was a large influx of French who had been expelled from Nova Scotia. Spain was in control from 1762 until the purchase of the territory by the United States in 1803, but French was the common language.

The private company that operated Louisiana ignored schools, as did the population at large. A school for boys soon closed. Apprenticeship was the training route for boys. However the nuns of the Catholic Church took in charge of education for girls with the Ursuline Academy in New Orleans. It was founded in 1727 by the French sisters of the Order of Saint Ursula. It is both the oldest, continuously-operating school for girls in the United States and the oldest Catholic school in the U.S.. It also holds many American firsts, including the first female pharmacist, first woman to contribute a book of literary merit, first convent, first free school and first retreat center for ladies, and first classes for female African-American slaves, free women of color, and Native Americans.

== See also ==
- History of education in the United States
- History of education in Massachusetts
- History of education in New York City
- History of education in the Southern United States
