= Parker v Clark =

- Citation: [1960] 1 WLR 286

Keywords
- Creation of legal relations

Parker v Clark [1960] 1 WLR 286 is an English contract law case concerning reliance and creation of legal relations in a social type of agreement. It is cited frequently in horn books, case books, and Cliff Notes-type of law school study guides.

== Facts ==
The Clarks, an elderly couple, invited their niece and her husband, the Parkers to live with them. The Parkers said they would like to, but it would mean they would have to sell their own house. The Clarks assured the Parkers that in doing so they would leave a share of the Clark house to Mrs Parker, and her daughter, in their will. The Parkers sold their house, lent the balance of the money to their daughter, who in turn bought a flat. Then the Parkers moved in. But they fell out. The Clarks asked them to leave, and the Parkers sued for breach of contract.

== Judgment ==
Devlin J held that the Clarks were liable for damages to the Parkers given that the Parkers had relied to their detriment on the assurance of the Clarks that they would have a place to stay.

I cannot believe… that the defendant really thought the law would leave him at liberty, if he so chose, to tell the [claimants] when they arrived that he had changed his mind, that they could take their furniture away, and that he was indifferent whether they found anywhere else to live or not.

== See also ==
- Detrimental reliance
- English contract law
- Quasi-contract
