= Dame school =

Type of school

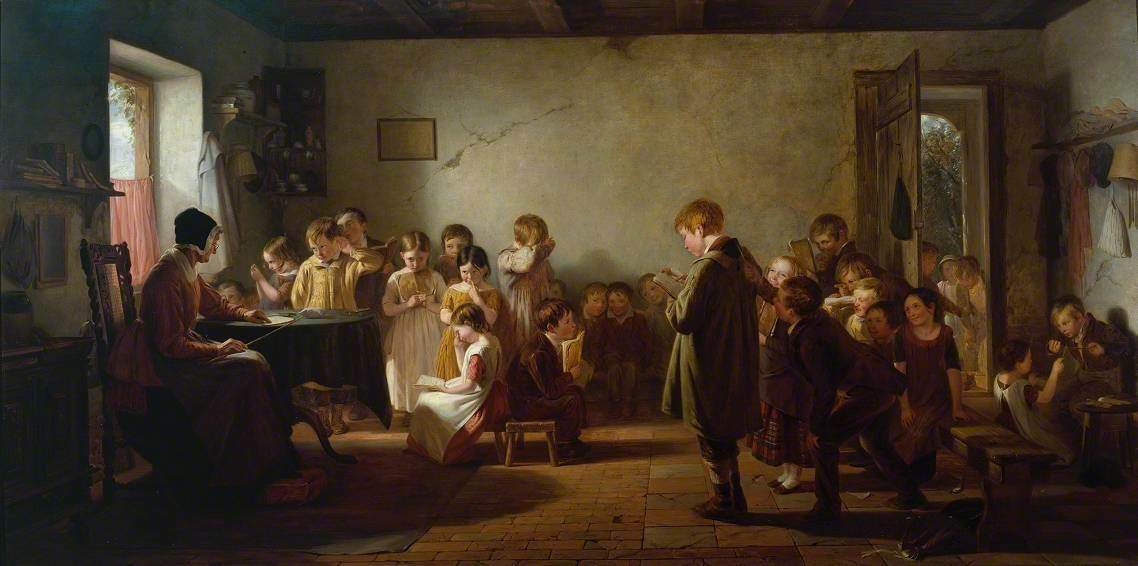
A Dame's School by Thomas Webster, 1845

Dame schools were small, privately run schools for children aged two to five. They emerged in Great Britain and its colonies during the early modern period. These schools were taught by a "school dame", a local woman who would care for children and teach them the alphabet for a small fee. Dame schools were localized, and could typically be found at the town or parish level.

At dame schools, children could be expected to learn reading and arithmetic, and were sometimes also educated in writing. Girls were often instructed in handiwork such as knitting and sewing. Dame schools lasted from the sixteenth century to about the mid-nineteenth century, when compulsory education was introduced in Britain. Dame schools were the precursors to present-day nursery and primary schools. Although sometimes ridiculed, there were many famous alumni, including Samuel Johnson and William Wordsworth for certain, and possibly Charles Dickens.

== Britain ==
=== 17th and 18th century dame schools ===
The origins of dame schools are unknown. They seem to have naturally evolved from a demand for accessible early childhood education and cheap, convenient childcare. In many instances, dame schools were taught in the teacher's own home. School dames laboured with small groups of children ages 2–5 wherever a demand existed and their own qualifications were accepted. Dame schools did not form a network; instead, they were independently run by women in their own local areas. Many of these teachers were either impoverished middle class widows or older unmarried women, or young, unmarried women who needed additional income. A few dame schools were taught by men.

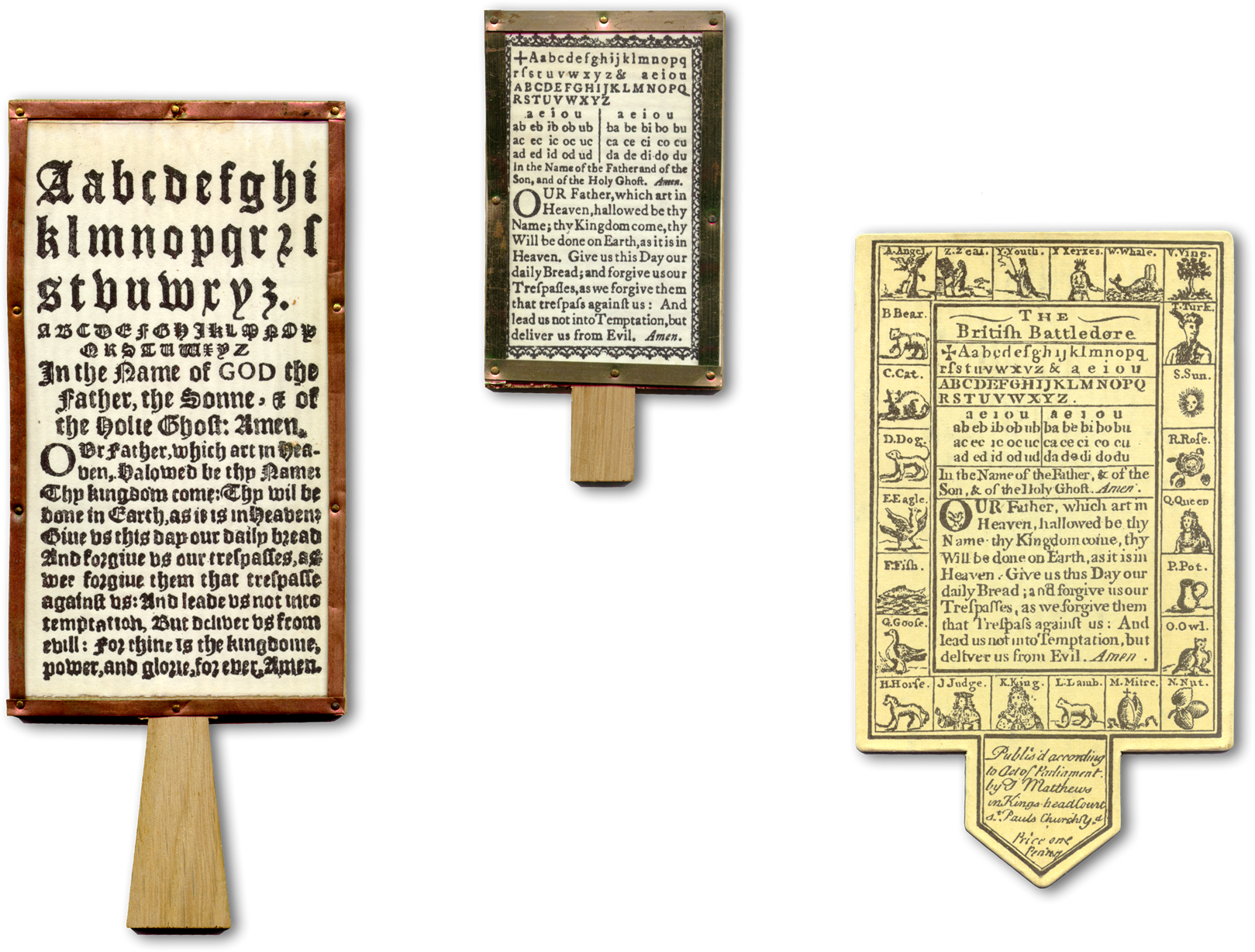
Examples of hornbooks

School dames often only charged a few shillings in fees. For instance, Dame Seamer of Darlington, Durham was recorded as receiving four shillings a year per pupil. In the mid-17th century, that sum would be roughly four days wages for a skilled tradesman, and a loaf of bread cost approximately sixpence.

Dame school pupils were the children of tradesmen and labouring parents, and in many cases, a dame school education was the only form of education these children ever received. The teacher would offer class for several hours per the day. In class, she would teach her pupils reading and writing, often from a hornbook. During this time period, reading and writing were taught separately, and it was more common for both girls and boys to learn to read, and for just boys to learn to write. Even so, during the eighteenth century a rising movement discouraged working-class children from learning to write, so in some cases dame school pupils may not have been taught writing at all. The ability to read the Bible, however, was viewed as a religious obligation, so learning to read was always encouraged. Some school dames would teach their pupils the Catechism, or would invite the local clergyman to teach children the catechism during class time. Typically, rudimentary arithmetic would also be provided, offering pupils the opportunity to learn the calculation of household accounts. Girls in particular would be taught how to knit at school, providing them with an important vocational skill.

Dame schools seem to have been widely spread across England by the eighteenth century. The rector Francis Brokesby said of the school dame's efforts, "There are few country villages where some or other do not get a livelihood by teaching school, so there are now not many but can write and read, unless it have been their own or their parent's fault." However, it is difficult to estimate an exact number of dame schools in England during a given time period: while school masters and mistresses were licensed, the informal nature of the dame school makes documentation of them scarce. For instance, of 836 villages surveyed in Yorkshire during the Tudor period, there were dame schools in approximately one village in forty.

=== 19th century dame schools ===
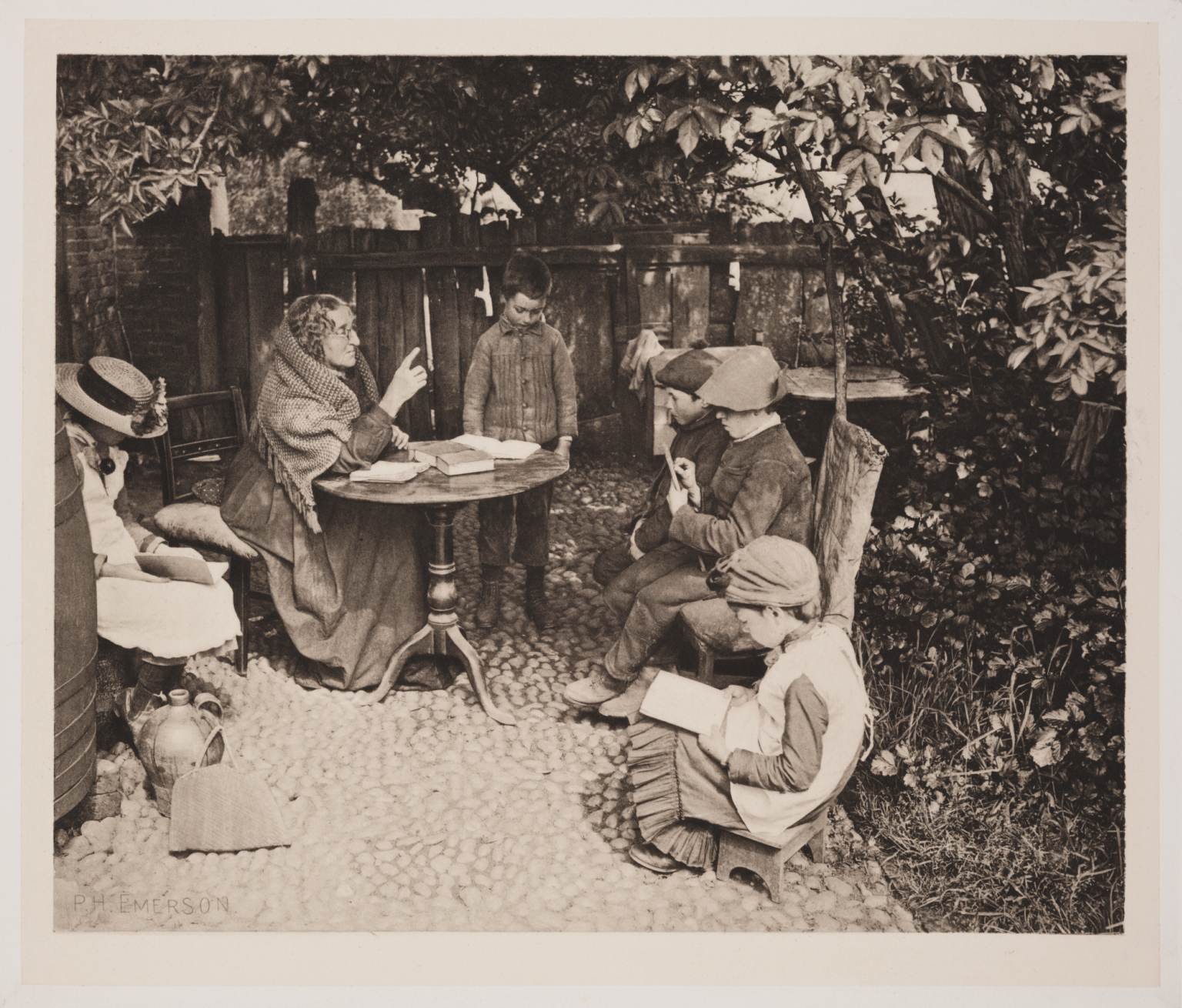
A late 19th-century dame school class with five students in East Anglia, England

Dame schools were largely affected by the industrialization of the nineteenth century. As more and more parents worked in factories, dame schools offered a form of cheap day care. Some offered only child care, while others also offered education. The Sunday School movement also arose in the 19th century, and operated similarly to the dame schools: children would attend Sunday School every Sunday to receive basic literacy instruction and religious lessons. Despite this, in many ways dame schools continued to function in their traditional way: offering rudimentary education to pupils for a small fee.

The 19th century was also marked by educational social reform movements, which greatly impacted dame schools. Near the middle of the century, private philanthropists established free schools targeted to educate lower-class children. However, many parents were unhappy to send their children to these middle-class schools, and opted instead to pay to send their children to the local dame school. In many areas of East London, especially in Spitalfields and Bethnal Green, more children were educated at dame schools than at philanthropic schools.

However, as the century progressed, dame schools came to be viewed in an increasingly negative light, perhaps because social reformers and politicians alike were so focused on reforming the educational system away from small, localized institutions into a national, standardized, and compulsory system. Dame schools were portrayed as travesties of schools, incapable of teaching children anything useful. Some historians have suggested that this is not a complete picture arguing that part of what appealed to families about Dame schools and led to them being criticised by the authorities was that they were run by the working classes for themselves whilst other educational options were guided by middle class officials through the state, charity or the church who wanted to ensure that education did not challenge the strict social structure of Victorian society. Dame schools were more informal, run in the kinds of homes their pupils were already familiar with and gave parents more control over their children's schooling.

In 1861, the Newcastle Commission surveyed schools across Britain, including many dame schools. The commission reported that 2,213,694 children of the poorer classes were in elementary day schools. Of that number, 573,536 were attending private schools, including dame schools. The commission painted a woeful portrait of dame schools, stating that they failed to provide children with an education that would be serviceable to them later in life.

The Elementary Education Act 1870 (33 & 34 Vict. c. 75), a product of the Newcastle Commission, set the framework for schooling of all children between the ages of 5 and 12 in England and Wales. Subsequently, most dame schools closed since there were now new educational facilities available for children.

As late as 1850, around 30 percent of all children attended Dame schools.

=== Notable dame school attendees ===
- William Wordsworth: attended a dame school in Penrith, Cumbria, under the teacher Mrs. Anne Birkett. It was there that he met his wife, Mary Hutchinson. Of his dame school experience, he said, "The old Dame school did not affect to make theologians, or logicians, but, she taught to read, and she practised the memory, often no doubt by rote; but still the faculty was improved. Something perhaps she explained, and left the rest to the parents, to masters, and to the master of the parish."
- John Keats: attended a dame school in London.
- Oliver Goldsmith: learnt his letters from Mrs Delap at her dame school.
- Charles Dickens: attended a school established by a mistress on Rome Lane in Chatham, Kent. In his novel Great Expectations, Dickens' protagonist Pip attends a dame school taught by Mr. Wopsle's great-aunt, which is described as being nearly entirely useless.
- William Shenstone: wrote The Schoolmistress, A Poem based on his experience at a dame school.
- George Crabbe: wrote a poem based on his experience at a dame school in his Poems: Volume 1.

== North America ==
In Colonial America, dame schools were small private schools taught by women. They taught the three Rs and sometimes French, dancing, singing and embroidery for upper class young ladies.

The education provided by these schools ranged from basic to exceptional. The basic type of dame school was more common in New England, where basic literacy was expected of all classes, than in the southern colonies, where there were fewer educated women willing to be teachers.

Motivated by the religious needs of Puritan society and their own economic needs, some colonial women in 17th century rural New England opened small, private schools in their homes to teach reading and catechism to young children. An education in reading and religion was required for children by the Massachusetts School Law of 1642. This law was later strengthened by the famous Old Deluder Satan Act. According to Puritan beliefs, Satan would try to keep people from understanding the Scriptures, therefore it was considered necessary that all children be taught how to read. Dame schools fulfilled this requirement when parents were unable to educate their young children in their own home. For a small fee, women, often housewives or widows, offered to take in children to whom they would teach a little writing, reading, basic prayers and religious beliefs. These women received "tuition" in coin, home industries, alcohol, baked goods and other valuables. Teaching materials generally included, and often did not exceed, a hornbook, primer, Psalter and Bible. Both girls and boys were provided education through the dame school system. Dame schools generally focused on the four R's of education — Reading, Riting, Rithmetic, and Religion. In addition to primary education, girls in dame schools might also learn sewing, embroidery, and other "graces". Most girls received their only formal education from dame schools because of sex-segregated education in common or public schools during the colonial period. If their parents could afford it, after attending a dame school for a rudimentary education in reading, colonial boys moved on to grammar schools where a male teacher taught advanced arithmetic, writing, Latin and Greek.

In the 18th and 19th centuries, some dame schools offered boys and girls from wealthy families a "polite education". The women running these elite dame schools taught "reading, writing, English, French, arithmetic, music and dancing". Schools for upper-class girls were usually called "female seminaries", "finishing schools" etc. rather than "dame schools".

== Australia ==
The first known school in Australia was founded in Sydney in December 1789 by Isabella Rossen. The second known school in Australia was founded by Mary Johnson in Parramatta in 1791. Both women were convicts supervised by clergyman Rev. Richard Johnson.

== See also ==
- History of education in England
- Public school (United Kingdom)
- Education in early modern Scotland
- History of childhood care and education
- Education in the Thirteen Colonies
- History of education in the United States
