= Richard Pierce (publisher) =

American printing publisher and newspaper owner

Richard Pierce (died c. 1691) was an early American printing press owner and publisher who printed Publick Occurrences Both Forreign and Domestick for Benjamin Harris, generally considered the first newspaper printed in America.

In some vital records, his name is rendered Richard Pearce. Benjamin Franklin and others write that Pierce was conflated with a London printer of the same name. Franklin wrote that Pierce came to Boston and served his apprenticeship under John Foster. After Foster's death, he was employed by Samuel Green Jr. Pierce married Sarah Cotton in 1680; she died in 1690. Among other works printed was Richard Steere's A Monumental Memorial and New England Primer via his wife's family connection to John Cotton.

== Sources ==
- Littlefield, George Emery (1907). The Early Massachusetts Press, 1638-1711. Vol. I. The Club of Odd Volumes.
- Littlefield, George Emery (1907). The Early Massachusetts Press, 1638-1711. Vol. II. The Club of Odd Volumes.
