= Andrew Barclay (bookbinder) =

Scottish-born colonial American bookbinder (1737–1823)

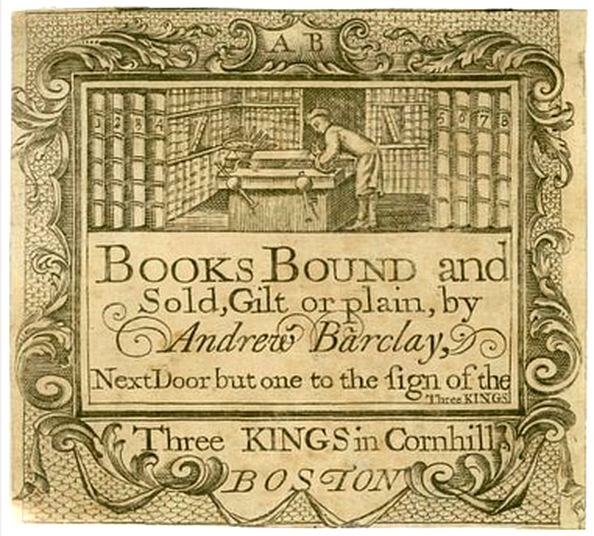
Andrew Barclay, bookbinding trade label

Andrew Barclay (1737–1823) was a Scottish bookbinder who emigrated from Kinross-shire to Boston in the British-American colonies in the mid-eighteenth century. As the American Revolutionary War drew near, Barclay sided with the Loyalists and was compelled to leave Boston when the British were driven out in March 1776. Upon leaving Boston he was assigned a command in charge of getting Loyalist refugees out of Boston to Nova Scotia. Soon after, he continued his trade in British-occupied New York for the duration of the war. Bookbinder's trade labels like Barclay's, found on the inside cover of some of his works, are considered a rarity among books printed in colonial America.

== Background ==
Andrew Barclay was born in the small town called Cleish in Kinross-shire. He was the third of four sons born to James and Marion Barclay, and was baptized on 31 March 1738. Little else is known of his youth and family life in Scotland.

Barclay was one of a group of Scottish bookbinders and booksellers who, at the age of 21, emigrated to the colonies and worked in Boston before and during the War for American Independence. His brother John arrived at Boston six years thereafter. Only a small percentage of bookbinders distinguished their work by including their signature trade label on the inside cover of the works they bound. Consequently, bookbinder's trade labels are seldom found in the various works that were published in Eighteenth-Century colonial America. The various works bound by Andrew Barclay containing such labels are considered among the rare exceptions to that advent, with only a few known surviving examples. Historians in this field have searched the rare book departments in various public and university libraries for these labels and have only found several examples. They maintain that the books containing binder's trade labels have largely gone unnoticed or unidentified and hope that more examples are yet to be found pending continued searches.

Before 1750 most bookbinders established their trade in Boston simply because its numerous religious establishments produced the largest quantity of printed religious literature that needed binding. As the ideals of revolution and independence became more prevalent Barclay sympathized with the Loyalists. In the early stages of the Revolutionary War he fled to Nova Scotia, then returned to the colonies at New York after the British had occupied that city, where he continued his trade for the duration of the war. The work of other immigrant binders was put on hold by the uncertainty of the war. John Mein and William MacAlpine, also ardent Loyalists, fled the colonies and returned to Scotland.

== Bookbinder ==
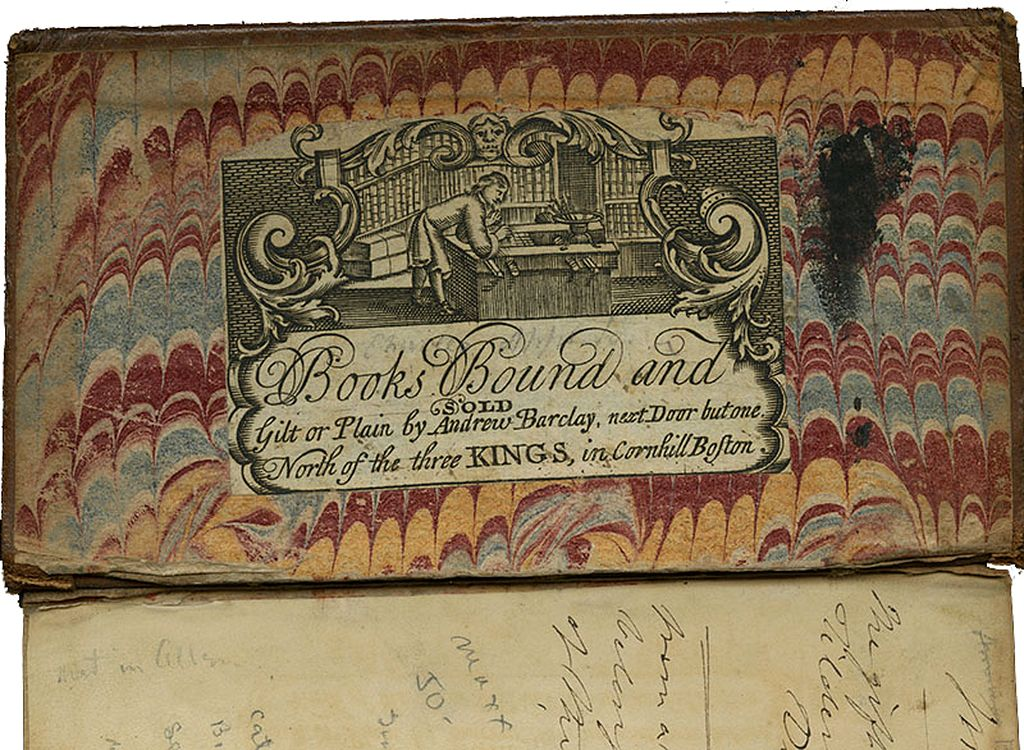
Andrew Barclay trade label on inside cover of A New Version of the Psalms, printed by MacAlpine and Fleming, 1765, binding by Barclay

Barclay's first bookbinding shop was located in Cornhill, Boston, where other printers and book sellers had established themselves. In colonial America, bookbinders were an obscure group of tradesmen who rarely took official credit on the title page of the works they bound. Because of limited resources, with virtually no patronage from royalty or wealth, with little access to superior sources of materials, along with the unstable and wavering economic and political factors present in the colonies, their work was generally of average quality compared to that of European bookbinders. Very often they combined the business of bookbinding with bookselling and sometimes with printing and publishing. There is no known bookbinder of American origin that was known to sign or label the works he bound. The two exceptions in the American colonies both emigrated from Scotland; Andrew Barclay and Samuel Taylor, who worked out of Boston and Philadelphia respectively.

In 1764 while Isaiah Thomas was an apprentice for Zechariah Fowle, now operating a printing press on his own, he printed Tom Thumb's playbook; To teach children their letters as soon as they can speak, which he commissioned Barclay for the bookbinding, and which bears Barclay's imprint. In September and October 1771 ads advertising bookbinding by Barclay appeared for six consecutive weeks in Thomas' patriot newspaper, The Massachusetts Spy.

Andrew Barclay, At the Gilt Bible in Cornhill, Hereby informs his customers and others,
that he has just imported from Glasgow, a neat assortment of BOOKS ... Likewise,
all Sorts of Binding, Lettering, and Gilding done in the neatest and best manner...

Both Barclay and Taylor are known for their elaborately engraved trade labels which are found on the inside cover of their works. Barclay's signature label is more fanciful and somewhat more widely known than that of Taylor. There are five known works where Barclay's labels can be found, while there are three known works where those of Taylor occur. The inscription on Barclay's trade labels typical read, "Bound by Andrew Barclay, Next Door but one to the Sign of the Three Kings in Cornhill".

Consistent with Barclay's Loyalist sympathies, he bound works by William MacAlpine, Nathaniel Hurd and John Hicks who fled Boston for Halifax with the British Army, all of whom had written in opposition to the prospect of American independence. When the American Revolutionary War broke out Barclay as a Loyalist assumed an active role by joining the Royal North British Volunteers against the rebels in Boston. When the British troops evacuated Boston in March 1776, he was forced to abandon his bookbinding wares and sailed for Nova Scotia, and soon thereafter to New York, where he remained until the end of the war; before leaving New York Barclay was honored by Sir Guy Carleton, and given a command over a company of Loyalist refugees bound for Shelburne, Nova Scotia, where he settled into a life of farming and ranching and was seldom involved in bookbinding.

Andrew Barclay died in Shelburne, Nova Scotia, on 2 July 1823, at age 86. His estate was appraised at £280. The various items listed in his will included a set of bookbinder's tools and other items.

== Works bound by Barclay ==
- Brady, Nicholas (1773). New version of the Psalms of David : fitted to the tunes used in churches. Boston : Printed for and sold by Andrew Barclay.

== See also ==
- John Ratcliff (bookbinder) — seventeenth-century bookbinder, first in the American colonies
- Early American publishers and printers
- List of early American publishers and printers
- Bookbinding

== Bibliography ==
- Amory, Hugh; Hall, David D. (2009). A History of the Book in America: Volume 1: The Colonial Book in the Atlantic World. University of North Carolina Press. ISBN 978-0-8078-68003.
- French, Hannah D. (1961). "The Amazing Career of Andrew Barclay, Scottish Bookbinder, of Boston". Studies in Bibliography. 14. Bibliographical Society of the University of Virginia: 145–162. JSTOR 40371302.
- Lehmann-Haupt, Hellmut; French, Hannah Dustin; Rogers, Joseph William (1967). Bookbinding in America; three essays. New York, R.R. Bowke.
- Tebbel, John William (1972). A history of book publishing in the United States / Vol. I, The creation of an industry, 1630-1865. Vol. I. New York : Bowker. ISBN 978-0-8352-04897.
- Thomas, Isaiah (1874). The history of printing in America, with a biography of printers. Vol. I. New York, B. Franklin.
- —— (1874). The history of printing in America, with a biography of printers. Vol. II. New York, B. Franklin.
- Thomas, Isaiah (1909). Hill, Benjamin Thomas (ed.). The Diary of Isaiah Thomas. Vol. I. The American Antiquarian Society.
- Samford, C. Clement; Hemphill, C. Clement (1990). Bookbinding in Colonial Virginia. Colonial Williamsburg Foundation Library.
- Wroth, Lawrence C. (1938). The Colonial Printer. Portland, Me., The Southworth-Anthoensen press.
- The Adverts 250 Project
