= Royal American =

Royal American can refer to:

- Royal American Magazine (The Royal American Magazine, or Universal Repository of Instruction and Amusement), (January 1774 - March 1775), a short-lived monthly periodical published in Boston, Massachusetts
- Royal American Regiment, see King's Royal Rifle Corps, a British Army infantry regiment raised in colonial North America
- Royal American Shows, an American travelling carnival company operating from the 1920s to the 1990s

== See also ==
- American Royal, a livestock show, horse show and rodeo held each year in October and November at Kemper Arena, Kansas City, Missouri
- American (disambiguation)
- Royal (disambiguation)
