= Worcester Spy =

American newspaper founded in 1775 in Worcester, Massachusetts

- Noscere res humanas est Hominis
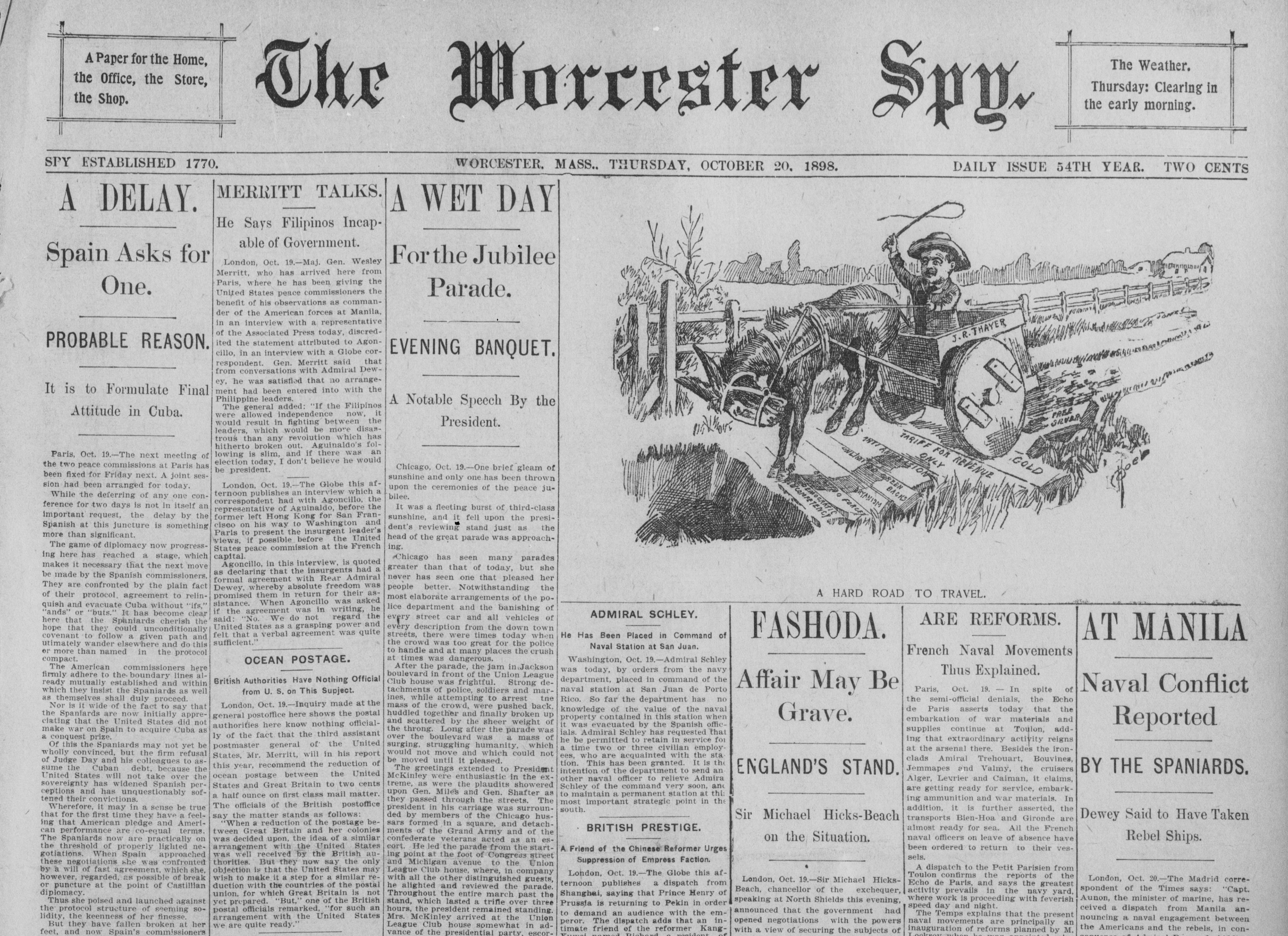
- Front Page of 'The Worcester Spy' for October 20th, 1898
- Founder: Isaiah Thomas
- Publisher: Isaiah Thomas
- Founded: 1775
- Relaunched: 2011, as The New Worcester Spy (now The Wormtown Herald).
- Headquarters: Worcester, Massachusetts
- City: Worcester, Massachusetts
- Country: United States
- Free online archives: Worcester Spy at LOC.gov (Chronicling America)

The Worcester Spy, originally known as the Massachusetts Spy, was a newspaper founded in 1770 in Boston, Massachusetts by Isaiah Thomas, dedicated to supporting the Revolutionary cause against the British. In the 19th century, it became an organ for abolitionist sentiment.

== History ==
In 1775, under threat from "Boston Tories", Thomas removed the newspaper's presses to Worcester, Massachusetts. In 1781 the title was changed to Thomas's Massachusetts Spy; or the Worcester Gazette with the motto "The noble Efforts of a Virtuous, Free and United People, shall extirpate Tyranny, and establish Liberty and Peace." At the end of the war the motto was again changed to "Noscere res humanas est Hominis" ("knowledge of the world is necessary for every man").

Thomas continued publication of the paper until 1802, when he transferred control of his business concerns to his son.

In 1859 the paper was purchased by John Denison Baldwin, and later co-owned and edited by his sons, Captain John Stanton Baldwin and Charles Clinton Baldwin.

In 2011, faculty and students in the English Department at Worcester State University launched the New Worcester Spy, an on-line news and literary journal with the mission to "revive the great Worcester journalistic tradition of publishing brave stories that impart necessary, sometimes terrible, truths, for the edification of readers."

This student publication is now known as the Wormtown Herald..

== See also ==
- History of American newspapers
- The Worcester Spy at The Library of Congress (Chronicling America)
- The New Worcester Spy (Archived)
- The Worcester Spy (Facebook Page)
- The Wormtown Herald (formerly The New Worcester Spy)
