= John D. Baldwin =

American politician (1809–1883)

John Denison Baldwin
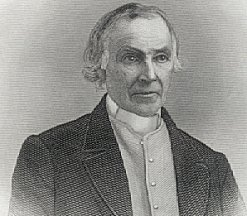

Member of the U.S. House of Representatives from Massachusetts's 8th district
- In office March 4, 1863 – March 3, 1869
- Preceded by: Charles R. Train
- Succeeded by: George Frisbie Hoar

Member of the Connecticut House of Representatives from the Blank district
- In office 1847–1852
- Preceded by: George S. Catlin
- Succeeded by: William W. Boardman

Personal details
- Born: September 28, 1809 North Stonington, Connecticut, US
- Died: July 8, 1883 (aged 73) Worcester, Massachusetts, US
- Party: Republican
- Spouse: Lemira Hathaway
- Profession: Minister, Writer, Editor

John Denison Baldwin (September 28, 1809 – July 8, 1883) was an American politician, Congregationalist minister, newspaper editor, and popular anthropological writer. He was a member of the Connecticut State House of Representatives and later a member of the U.S. House of Representatives from Massachusetts.

== Biography ==
Baldwin briefly studied law, but graduated with a degree in theology from Yale Divinity School in 1834. He became a Congregationalist minister and preached in West Woodstock, North Branford, and North Killingly, all in Connecticut. In 1839 Yale awarded him an honorary Master of Arts degree.

He became a member of the Connecticut State House of Representatives in 1847.

Baldwin was active in the Free Soil and anti-slavery movements. He edited anti-slavery journals the "Republican" (published in Hartford) and the "Commonwealth" (published in Boston), and from 1859 became the owner and editor of the "Worcester Spy," what George Frisbie Hoar called "one of the most influential papers in New England."

From this time onwards Baldwin was resident in Worcester, Massachusetts. He was a delegate to the 1860 Republican National Convention, where Abraham Lincoln was nominated as Republican presidential candidate, and in 1863 he was elected to the U.S. House of Representatives for Massachusetts's 8th congressional district. A "close friend" of both Charles Sumner and Henry Wilson, Senators from Massachusetts, Baldwin served for three terms in the House, promoting full equal rights for black Americans in the wake of the Civil War. In 1869, when George F. Hoar was nominated as the Republican candidate for his seat, Baldwin returned full-time to his journalistic and anthropological work. He edited the Worcester Spy until his death in 1883. In 1867 Baldwin was elected a member of the American Antiquarian Society.

=== Family ===
Baldwin married Lemira Hathaway of Bristol County, Massachusetts on April 3, 1832, and they had four children. Two daughters died by the age of 21, and neither married. Both of Baldwin's sons survived into adulthood and became partners in their father's newspaper business. The elder, John Stanton Baldwin, served as a captain in the 51st Massachusetts Volunteer Infantry in the Union Army during the Civil War.

John D. Baldwin was a distant cousin of Roger Sherman and of the Baldwin, Hoar, and Sherman family political family. He was also a direct descendant of Mayflower passenger John Billington.

== Anthropological writings and beliefs ==
Baldwin conducted correspondence with many notable thinkers of his time, including Ralph Waldo Emerson, Charles Darwin, James Russell Lowell, and particularly his friend Charles Sumner. He accepted Darwin's theory of evolution while maintaining a belief in the divine origin of "first forms."

In 1865 he was elected a corporate member of the American Oriental Society. Baldwin's anthropological writing posited the origins of human civilization as arising among an Arabian or Northeast African people, the Cushites, in pre-historic times.

In Ancient America, In Notes on American Archaeology he also speculated on the origins of the "Mound Builder" people then believed to have constructed the famous mounds around the Mississippi and Ohio River Valleys, suggesting that they had been an aboriginal people who had migrated northwards from Central America or Mexico. He rejected the then-common notion that they had been a lost European, Semitic, or Asian people who had been wiped out by the North American Indians, asserting on the contrary that the Mounds were "wholly original, wholly American" and "did not come from the Old World". He did, however, still subscribe to the idea that these "Mound Builders" were not the same as the American Indian inhabitants of the region at that time, who he believed were a separate race originating in Asia.

== Works ==
- A scriptural view of the Messiah: Being the substance of a sermon delivered in the Methodist chapel, Dighton, Mass., on Sunday evening, May 27, 1832, Edmund Anthony, Office of Independent Gazette, 1832.
- Lessons from the grave: A discourse delivered in North Branford, June 12, 1842, and occasioned by the death of Daniel Wheadon, Hitchcock & Stafford, 1842.
- The story of Raymond Hill,: And other poems, W.D. Ticknor & Co, 1847.
- STATE SOVEREIGNTY And TREASON. Speech of Hon. John D. Baldwin, of Massachusetts, Delivered in the House of Representatives, Washington, March 5, 1864, the House being in Committee of the Whole on the State of the Union., H. Polkinhorn, 1864.
- Congress and Reconstruction: Speech of Hon. John D. Baldwin of Massachusetts in the House of Representatives, April 7, 1866, 1866.
- Human rights and human races, Congressional Globe Office, 1868.
- Human rights and human races : speech of Mr. Baldwin, of Massachusetts, delivered in the House of Representatives, January 11, 1868, in reply to a speech of Hon. James Brooks, of New York, on the Negro race., F. & J. Rives & G.A. Bailey, 1868.
- Pre-Historic Nations; or, Inquiries Concerning Some of the Great Peoples and Civilizations of Antiquity, New York, Harper, 1869, ISBN 0-7661-0143-6.
- Ancient America, in notes on American archæology, New York, Harper, 1871, ISBN 1-56459-657-5.
- A record of the descendants of John Baldwin, of Stonington, Conn.: With notices of other Baldwins who settled in America in early colony times, Tyler & Seagrave, 1880.
- Thomas Stanton of Stonington, Conn: An incomplete record of his descendants, Tyler & Seagrave, 1882.
- A record of the descendants of Capt. George Denison of Stonington, Connecticut: With notices of his father and brothers, and some account of other Denisons who settled in America in the colony times.
