= Hornbook (law) =

One-volume legal treatises

In United States legal education, hornbooks are one-volume legal treatises, written primarily for law students on subjects typically covered by law school courses.

Hornbooks summarize and explain the law in a specific area. They are distinct from casebooks, which are collections of cases (or parts of cases) chosen to help illustrate and stimulate discussion about legal issues.

The term derives from the hornbook, an early children's educational tool, implying that the material is basic. Basic, settled legal principles are referred to as hornbook law. (See also black letter law).

== See also ==
- Black's Law Dictionary
- Bouvier's Law Dictionary
- Law dictionary
- Legal terminology textbook
- List of legal abbreviations
- Wex
