= Ibrahim Amin Baldar =

Kurdish author (1920-1998)

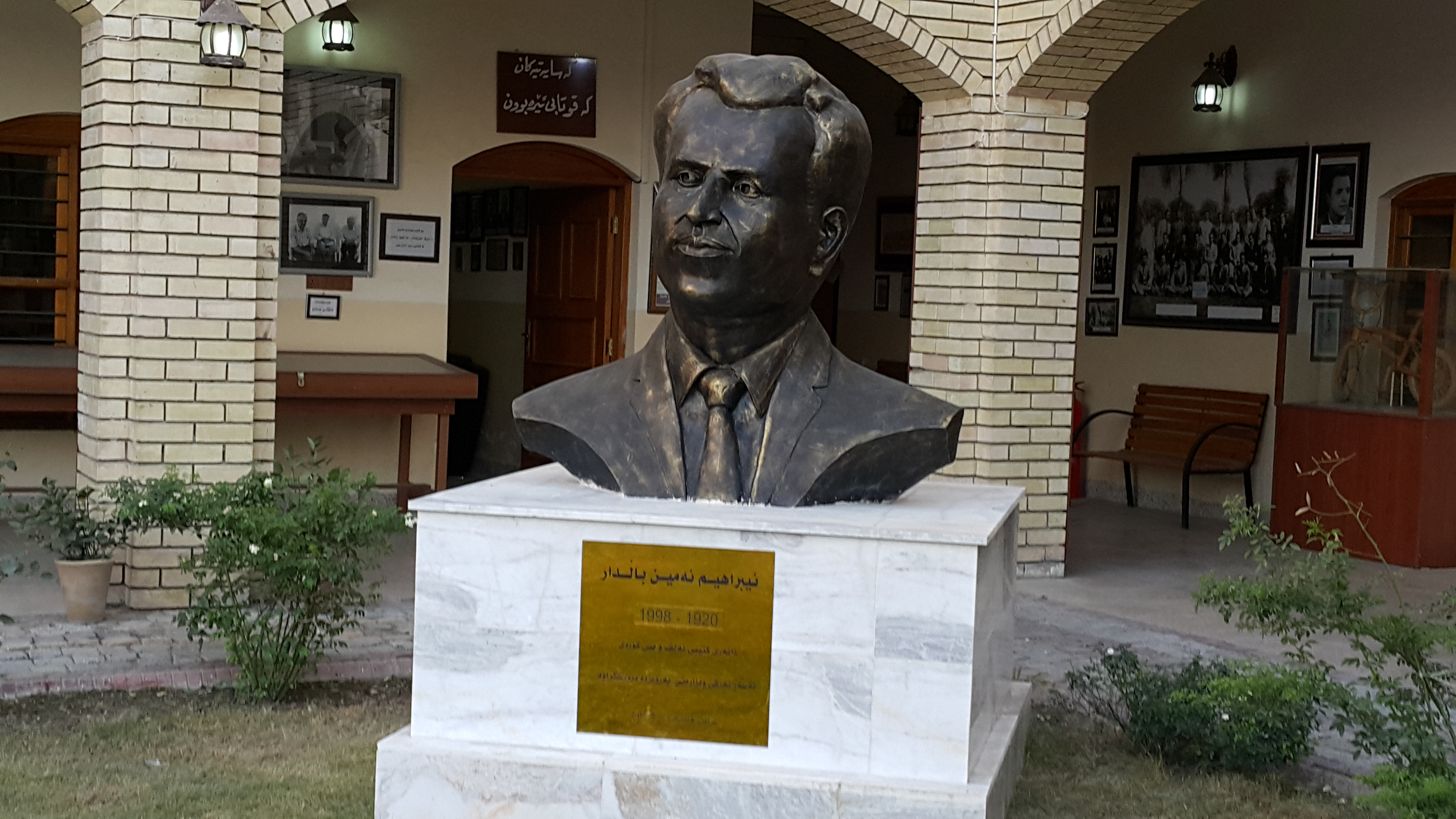
- His statue at the entrance of Erbil Museum of Education
- Born: July 1, 1920; Sulaymaniyah
- Died: July 10, 1998 (aged 78); Baghdad
- Occupations: teacher, author, educator
- Known for: First modern Kurdish Language Primer

Ibrahim Amin Baldar (1920–1998) (Kurdish: ئیبراهیم ئه‌مین باڵدار) was born in 1920 in the city of Sulaymaniyah. He is the author to the first official Kurdish language primer Alfubei Nwe published in 1951.

Baldar received a Bachelor degree from the Trade and Economy School in Baghdad in the 1950s , and his masters from the San Francisco State Teachers College in the 1960s. After finishing his studies in the USA he returned to his hometown and worked as lecturer at the Department of Literature at the University of Sulaymaniyah(later renamed to Salahaddin University) which was established in 1968.

Baldar continued to work at Salaheddin university until the late1980s, after that he moved to Baghdad and worked at Al-Mustansiriya University. He died on 10 July 1998 in Baghdad and was buried in Gardi Saywan cemetery in Sulaymaniyah.
