= Primer (textbook) =

First textbook for teaching of reading

A primer (in this sense usually pronounced /ˈprɪmər/, sometimes /ˈpraɪmər/, usually the latter in modern British English) is a first textbook for teaching of reading, such as an alphabet book or basal reader. The word also is used more broadly to refer to any book that presents the most basic elements of any subject. Secular primer textbooks developed out of medieval religious primer prayer books and educationally-oriented revisions of these devotionals proliferated during the English Reformation.

The Latin Enschedé Abecedarium of the late 15th century, translated into English as the Salisbury Prymer, has been identified as the earliest example of a printed primer. It presented the alphabet and several Catholic prayers.

Other historical examples of primers for children include:

- The New England Primer (1680s)
- McGuffey Readers (1836) in the US
- Bala Potam (Lessons for Children, 1850 & 1851) by Arumuka Navalar in Sri Lanka
- Al-Qiraa Al-Khaldouniya in 1923 by Sati' al-Husri in Arabic
- Alfudbei Nwe in 1951 by Ibrahim Amin Baldar in Kurdish

== See also ==
- Basal reader
- Hornbook
- Primary education
- Grammarians' War
- Book series
- Volume (bibliography)
- Collection (publishing)
