= Zechariah Fowle =

American printer and merchant

- Born: 1724; Charlestown, Boston, Province of Massachusetts Bay
- Died: 1776 (aged 51–52)
- Notable work: Massachusetts Spy
- Relatives: Daniel Fowle (brother)

Zechariah Fowle (1724–1776) was an early American printer and merchant of ballads and small books who worked in Boston. He was born in Charlestown, near Boston, of respected parents, and served his apprenticeship with his brother Daniel Fowle, who was at that period in partnership with Gamaliel Rogers, a carpenter.

== Career ==
Having no children, Fowle took on Isaiah Thomas, with the consent of his mother, as an apprentice, when Isaiah was a child, and provided him with room and board.

In 1742, Fowle entered into a partnership with Gamaliel Rogers and established the firm of Rogers & Fowle. They opened a printing shop in Prison lane, which was renamed Court street. They produced books in large numbers and varieties, which exceeded the usual works of the country.

In July, 1770, Isaiah Thomas, in connection with Zechariah Fowle, issued The Massachusetts Spy, named after several of the earlier papers in England, which bore the title of Spye.

Fowle printed little else other than ballads until 1757, when he began an edition of the Psalter, a religious work containing the Book of Psalms, for the local booksellers.

In its printing he was assisted by two young printers who had just completed their indentures. Fowle gave them proportionate part of the profits for their efforts. One of printers was Samuel Draper, a very worthy young man, with whom Fowle formed a partnership after the Psalter was printed. Their firm was Fowle & Draper. They set up shop on Marlborough Street, opposite the Founder's Arms. Among some of the noted works Fowle printed was an Almanac The new book of knowledge, published in 1767, authored by Isaiah Thomas.

== See also ==
- History of printing
- Colonial history of the United States

== Bibliography ==
- Hudson, Frederic (1873). Journalism in the United States, from 1690 to 1872. New York, Harper & Brothers.
- Thomas, Isaiah (1874). The history of printing in America, with a biography of printers. Vol. I. New York, B. Franklin.
- —— (1874). The history of printing in America, with a biography of printers. Vol. II. New York, B. Franklin.
