= Publick Occurrences Both Forreign and Domestick =

First multi-page newspaper printed in the Americas

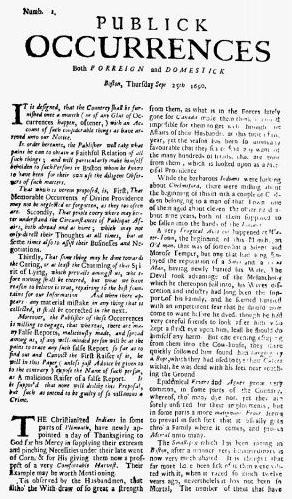
Publick Occurrences September 25th, 1690

Publick Occurrences Both Forreign and Domestick was the first multi-page newspaper published in British America. After its first issue, which carried an account that offended the colonial governor, the newspaper was promptly closed down by British colonial authorities, only days later. No other newspaper appeared in the colonies until fourteen years later.

== History ==
Publick Occurrences Both Forreign and Domestick was the first multi-page newspaper published in the British colonies in America. Before then, single-page newspapers, called broadsides, were published in the English colonies and printed in Cambridge in 1689. The first edition of Publick Occurrences was published September 25, 1690, in Boston, then a city in the Dominion of New England, and was intended to be published monthly, "or, if any Glut of Occurrences happen, oftener." It was printed by American Richard Pierce of Boston, and it was edited by Benjamin Harris, who was a refugee from England who had unsuccessfully tried to establish a free press there. The newspaper consisted of four pages 7 1/2 by 11 1/2 inches (19 by 29 cm), with two columns, with the last page left blank, allowing one to conveniently write a letter about its news that could be sent to another family member or friend. Without Parliamentary support or any prospective advertising, Harris quickly published what would prove to be the first and last issue of his newspaper. The only known copy in existence is housed in the London Public Record office, where it was discovered in 1845 by the Reverend Joseph B. Felt . Felt claimed that a man with the name George MacMasters published the article, though these claims have no basis.

The first and only issue, published on Thursday, September 25, 1690 (336 years ago), had an account of a battle waged by General Fitz-John Winthrop during King William's War covering the brutal treatment of French prisoners of war. No second edition was ever printed because the account angered the colonial government, which ordered the immediate suspension of the paper, only four days later on September 29, 1690, and which referred to the paper as a "pamphlet". All remaining issues of the newspaper were destroyed. The order stated:

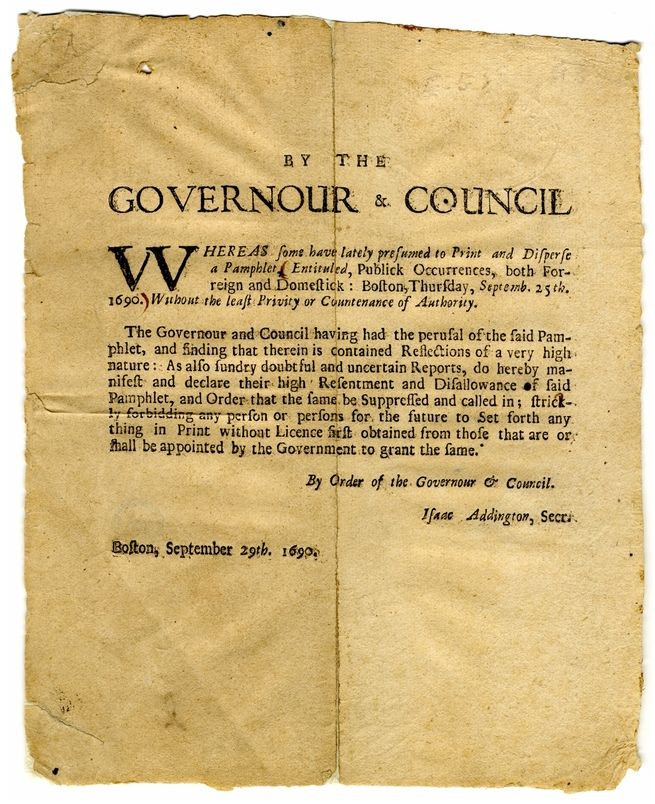
Order of the Governor & Council, 1690

"Whereas some have lately presumed to Print and Disperse a Pamphlet, Entitled, Publick Occurrences, both Forreign and Domestick: Boston, Thursday, Septemb. 25th, 1690. Without the least Privity and Countenance of Authority. The Governour and Council having had the perusal of said Pamphlet, and finding that therein contained Reflections of a very high nature: As also sundry doubtful and uncertain Reports, do hereby manifest and declare their high Resentment and Disallowance of said Pamphlet, and Order that the same be Suppressed and called in; strictly forbidden any person or persons for the future to Set forth any thing in Print without License first obtained from those that are or shall be appointed by the Government to grant the same."

By Order of the Governor and Council,

— Isaac Addington, Secr.,
Sept. 29, 1690,

The three-page newspaper did not contain any criticism on the new licensing law for printing newspapers, or make any issues about colonial government. Instead it appealed to and informed its readers about the various current issues, i.e. the smallpox outbreak, the successful harvest produced by the "Christianized" Indians, a murder, the execution of Native American prisoners of war. It also contained a story about the king of France, Louis XIV, who supposedly was sleeping with his son's wife—though since the wife was dead at that point it may have been published as a bit of fake news meant by the staunchly Protestant Harris to undermine the Catholic king. These issues were considered sensitive and questionable by colonial authorities, which led them to close down Harris' newspaper.

After the prompt suppression of Publick Occurrences and the subsequent passage of the newspaper and printing licensing law, future prospective publishers were discouraged from establishing new newspapers until 1704, when John Campbell established The Boston News-Letter. Campbell diligently made efforts to begin publication of his newspaper under authority, and with the proper license. Remembering the fate of the first newsletter, Campbell was careful not to print anything that could be construed as libelous or that otherwise would offend the Governor and the council; he generally limited himself to the reprinting of material taken from the London Flying Post and The London Gazette.

== See also ==
- Early American publishers and printers
- List of early American publishers and printers
- History of American newspapers
- History of newspaper publishing

== Bibliography ==
- Copeland, David A. (2000). Debating the issues in colonial newspapers : primary documents on events of the period. Westport, Conn. : Greenwood Press. ISBN 978-0-3133-09823.
- Lee, James Melvin (1923). History of American journalism. Boston & New York: Houghton Mifflin Company.
- Moore, John Weeks (1886). Moore's Historical, Biographical, and Miscellaneous Gatherings, in the form of disconnected notes relative to printers, printing, publishing, and editing of books, newspapers, magazines. Concord, N.H., Printed by the Republican press association.
- Shaw, Steven J. (1959). "Colonial Newspaper Advertising: A Step toward Freedom of the Press". The Business History Review. 33 (3). The President and Fellows of Harvard College: 409–420. doi:10.2307/3111955. JSTOR 3111955.
- Thomas, Isaiah (1874). The history of printing in America, with a biography of printers. Vol. I. New York, B. Franklin.
- Wroth, Lawrence C. (1938). The Colonial Printer. Portland, Me., The Southworth-Anthoensen press.
- "PUBLICK OCCURRENCES Both FORREIGN and DOMESTICK" (PDF). Publick Occurrences. National Humanities Center. 1690-09-25.
