= The New England Primer =

Series of children's early reading books

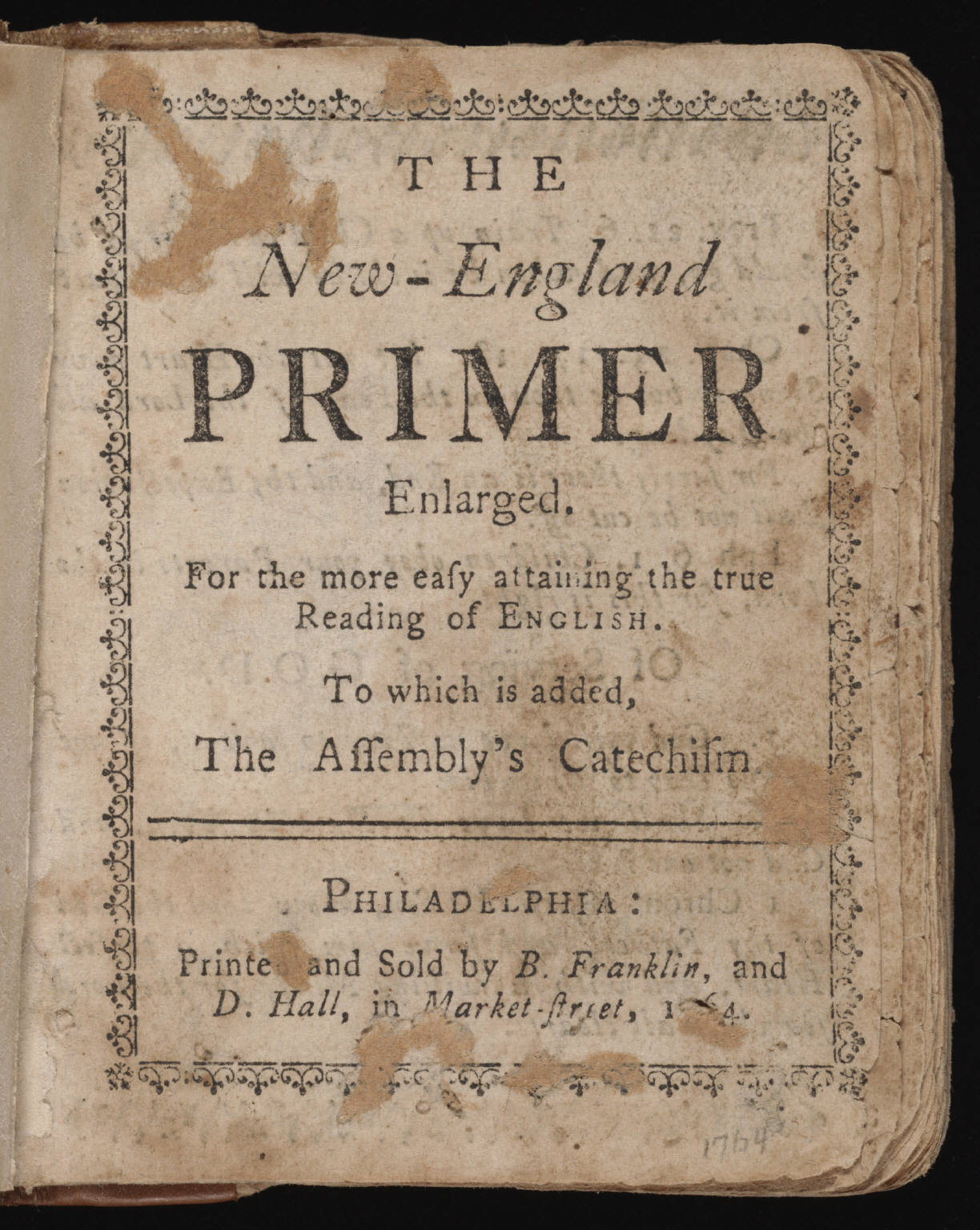
The New England Primer

The New England Primer was the first reading primer designed for the American colonies. It became the most successful educational textbook published in 17th-century colonial United States and it became the foundation of most schooling before the 1790s.

In the 17th century, the schoolbooks in use had been Bibles brought over from England. In 1686, the printer Benjamin Harris moved to Boston in order to escape the brief Catholic ascendancy under James II. Harris was the first publisher of the Primer, working between 1687 and 1690. His version was based largely upon The Protestant Tutor, which he had previously published in England, The selections for subsequent editions of the Primer varied somewhat over time. The 90-page work contained religious maxims, woodcuts, alphabetical assistants, acronyms, catechism answers, and moral lessons. It remained in print well into the 19th century and was even used until the 20th century. While widely popular with colonial schools, it was supplanted by Noah Webster's Blue Back Speller after 1790.

The theology of the Primer was a simplified version of Calvinism, intended mostly to inspire students to submit to the authority of God and their parents. The intended audience of Puritans was preoccupied with the topic of childhood depravity and was seeking solutions.

== History ==
The New England Primer was first published between 1687 and 1690 by printer Benjamin Harris, who had come to Boston in 1686 to escape the brief Catholic ascendancy under James II. It was based largely upon The Protestant Tutor, which he had published in England, and was the first reading primer designed for the American Colonies.

The selections in the New England Primer varied somewhat over time, although there was standard content for beginning reading instruction. Included were the alphabet, vowels, consonants, double letters, and syllabaries of two letters to six letter syllables. The 90-page work contained religious maxims, woodcuts, alphabetical assistants, acronyms, catechism answers, and moral lessons. The primer remained in print well into the 19th century and was even used until the 20th century. A reported 2 million copies were sold in the 18th century. No copies of editions before 1727 are known to survive; earlier editions are known only from publishers' and booksellers' advertisements.

== Theology ==
Many of its selections were drawn from the King James Bible and others were original. It embodied the dominant Puritan attitude and worldview of the day. Among the topics discussed are respect to parental figures, sin, and salvation. Some versions contained the Westminster Shorter Catechism; others contained John Cotton's shorter catechism, known as Spiritual Milk for Boston Babes; and some contained both.

David H. Watters argues that the Primer was built on rote memorization, the Puritans' distrust of uncontrolled speech, and their preoccupation with childhood depravity. By simplifying Calvinist theology the Primer enabled the Puritan child to define the "self" by relating his life to the authority of God and his parents. Emory Elliott argues that the Primer was part of the transformation that turned Puritans away from an angry and wrathful God the Father to the embrace of the gentle and loving Jesus Christ.

== Contents ==
Two of the most famous example verses are as follows

Now I lay me down to sleep,
I pray thee, Lord, my soul to keep;
If I should die before I wake,
I pray thee, Lord, my soul to take.

—1784 ed.

In Adam's Fall,
we sinned all.

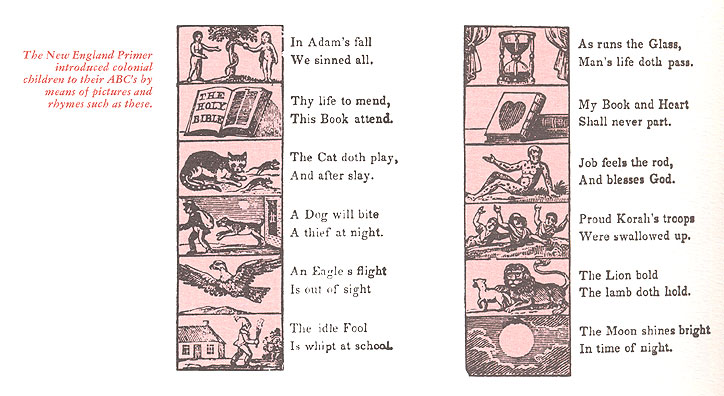

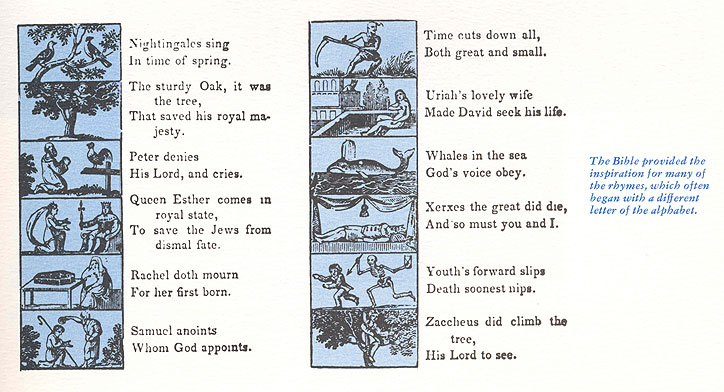

The text for L is alluded to in Washington Irving's The Legend of Sleepy Hollow: . . . "like the lion bold, which whilom so magnanimously the lamb did hold" ...

== Editions and reprints ==
There have been many reprints of The New England Primer.

- The New England Primer: Twentieth Century Reprint. Ginn & Company. 1901.
- New England Primer: Improved for the More Easy Attaining the True Reading of English: To Which Is Added the Assembly of Divines, and Mr. Cotton's Catechism. Aledo, Texas: WallBuilders. 1991. ISBN 0-925279-17-X. (note that this is the 1777 edition.)
- Klenk, Richard E. Sr. (1996). New England Primer: A Family & Homeschool Textbook. The 1843 Updated Edition with Lesson Plan. BizMin Association. ISBN 0-9648958-0-3. (A book, orig. a prayer book, used in teaching children to read or spell; hence, an elementary textbook.)

== See also ==
- Early American publishers and printers
- Alphabet book
- Basal reader
- Hornbook
