= Casebook =

Reference book of legal cases

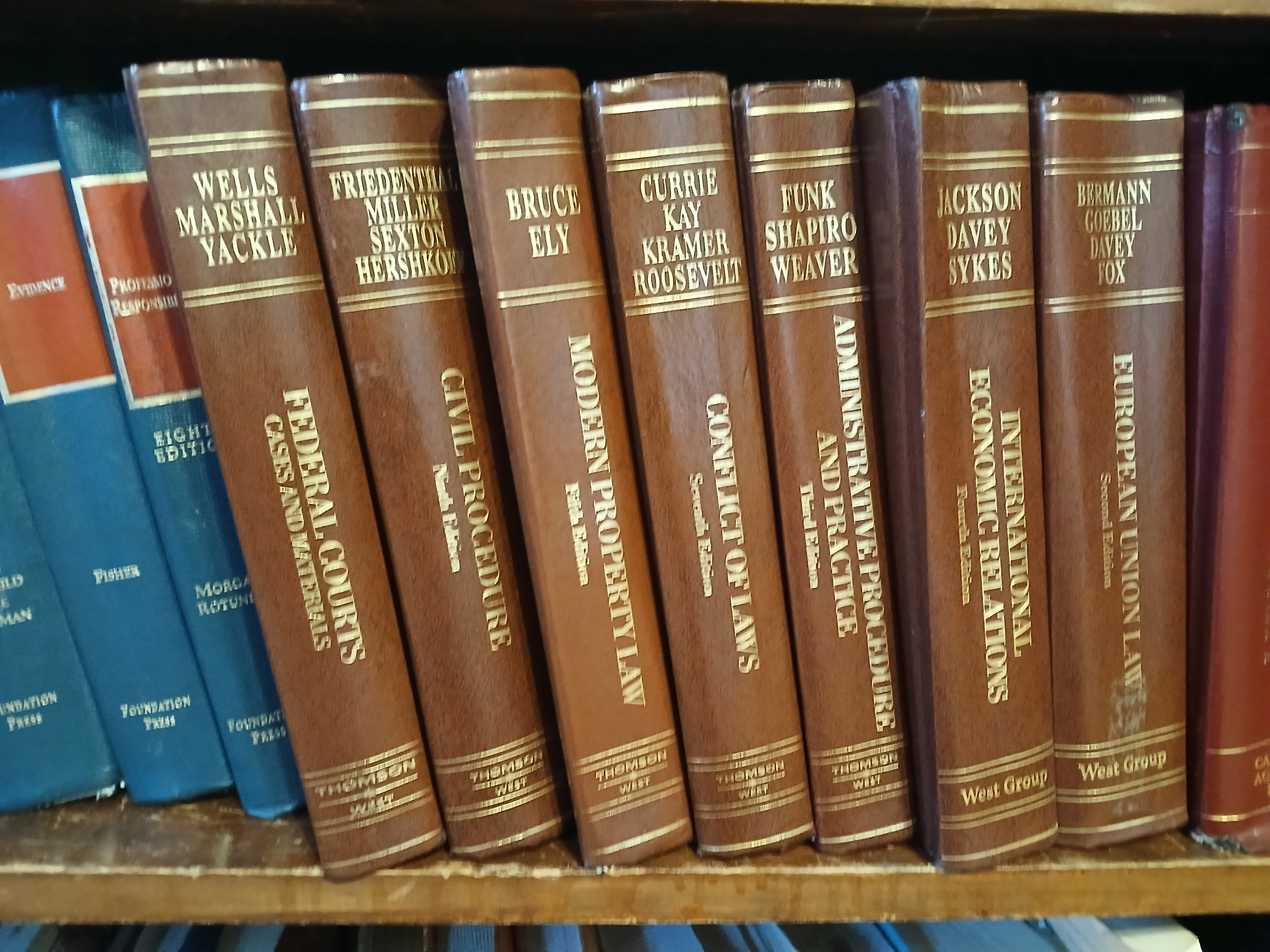
Casebooks commonly used in American law schools.

A casebook is a type of textbook used primarily by students in law schools. Rather than simply laying out the legal doctrine in a particular area of study, a casebook contains excerpts from legal cases in which the law of that area was applied. It is then up to the student to analyze the language of the case in order to determine what rule was applied and how the court applied it. Casebooks sometimes also contain excerpts from law review articles and legal treatises, historical notes, editorial commentary, and other related materials to provide background for the cases.

The teaching style based on casebooks is known as the casebook method and is supposed to instill in law students how to "think like a lawyer." The casebook method is most often used in law schools in countries with common law legal systems, where case law is a major source of law.

== Process ==
Most casebooks are authored by law professors, usually with two, three, or four authors, at least one of whom will be a professor at the top of their field in the area under discussion. New editions of casebooks often retain the names of famous professors on their covers decades after those professors have died. Updating of the books, then, falls on the shoulders of a younger generation of their colleagues. Such casebooks are often known by the names of the leading professor authors, such as Prosser, Wade, & Schwartz's, Torts: Cases & Materials (now in a 13th edition).

The leading publishers of casebooks in the United States are Thomson West (publisher of the Foundation Press and American Casebook Series imprints), Aspen Publishing, and LexisNexis. Each of these publishers uses a quickly identifiable color and pattern for their book covers across all subjects. Traditionally, the covers of casebooks came in the colors red, blue, or brown, although West's American Casebook Series has since switched to faded black cloth as an environmentally-friendly move.

Casebooks are intended only for use as teaching devices, but not as reference works. They are notorious for being "somewhat opaque", in that they are merely intended to deliver information in "small drips" during an entire law school semester under the supervision of a law professor. They do not always include legal doctrines in their most current form, as the point of a casebook (especially in first-year survey courses) is merely to introduce students to such doctrines. For more straightforward and current summaries of a particular area of law, students and attorneys turn to hornbooks.

The prevalence of the casebook method in American law schools has given rise to a market for commercial study aids "keyed" to a particular casebook edition. These study aids are generally summaries ("briefs") of the cases from the casebook to which it is "keyed," presenting them in the same order as the casebook. Often written by the same author who wrote the associated casebook, and published by the same company, "keyed" study aids are useful in distilling cases down to black-letter law. Popular study aid product lines include Legalines, High Court Case Summaries, and Gilbert Law Summaries published by West Thomson Reuters, Casenotes Legal Briefs by Aspen, and the Understanding series and Q&A series by LexisNexis.

== See also ==
- Sourcebook – similar structure used in the social sciences and humanities

== Bibliography ==
- Glanville Williams. "Case Books". Learning the Law. Eleventh Edition. Stevens and Sons. London. 1982. Pages 52 and 53.
- Sir Frederick Pollock. Oxford Lectures and other discourses. Macmillan and Co. London. 1890. Pages 105 and 106.
