= Royal American Magazine =

Magazine

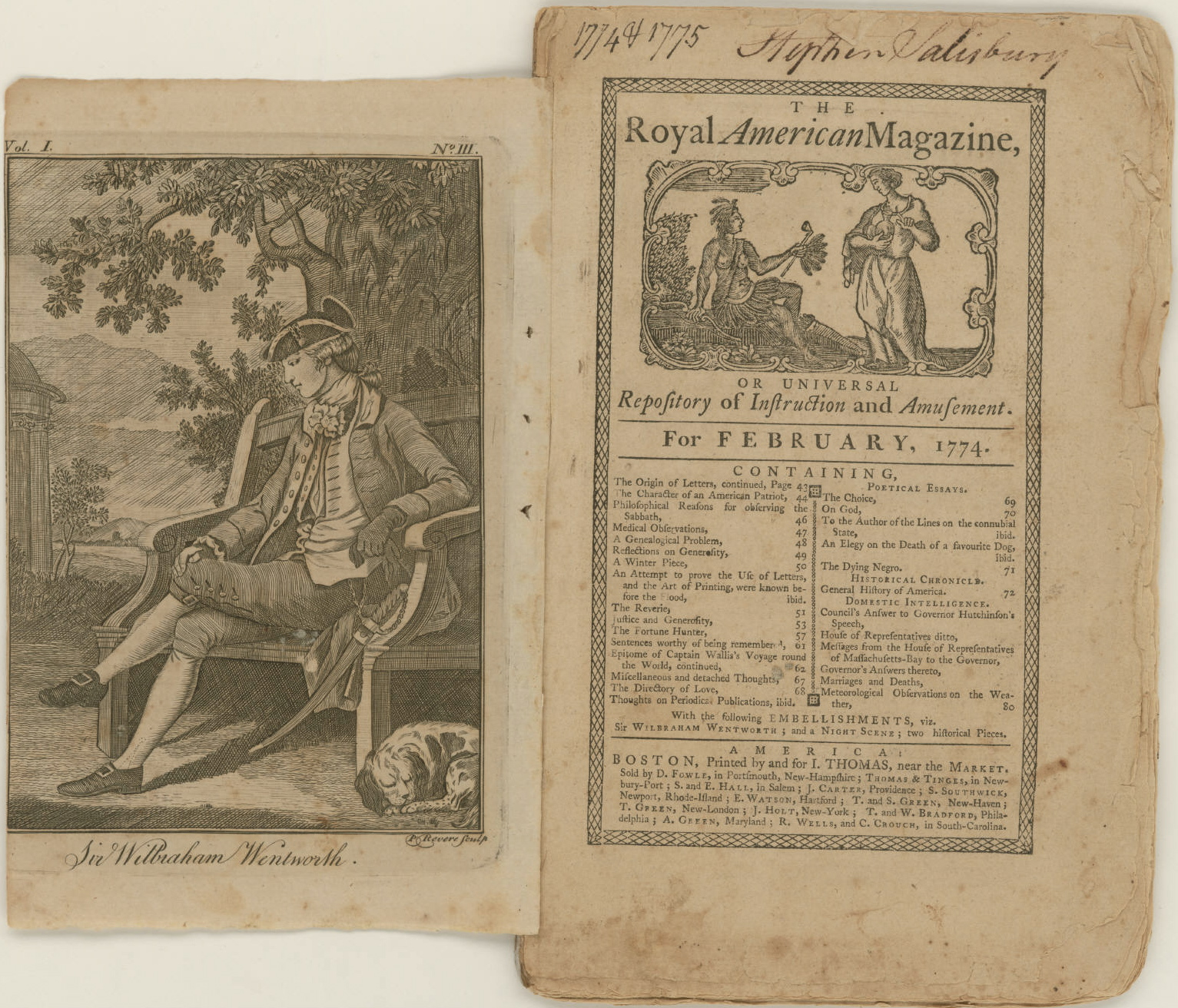
Royal American Magazine February 1774

The Royal American Magazine, or Universal Repository of Instruction and Amusement (January 1774 – March 1775) was a short-lived monthly periodical published in Boston, Massachusetts, by Isaiah Thomas and later by Joseph Greenleaf. It supported patriot and revolutionary sentiment in the Colonies against the Kingdom of Great Britain, and had contributors that included John Hancock and Paul Revere.

== History ==
In 1773, Thomas solicited subscribers to the proposed magazine, placing advertisements in local New England newspapers such as The Boston News-Letter. The first issue appeared in January 1774. It included a mix of original work and pieces reprinted from the British press: "conventional essays; articles on politics, medicine, agriculture, education, literature, and religion, advice to the ladies; fiction; 'poetical essays;' and current events, including marriages, deaths and meteorological tables." "The title of the Royal American Magazine epitomizes the magazine's double nature: it both wanted to imitate the British models of polite literature...and to advance the cause of the American patriots"

"Besides the usual variety of general literature, this work contains a faithful summary of the public transactions of Boston during that eventful year, and great value is added to the work by the public documents preserved in its pages," such as Thomas Hutchinson's History of the Colony of Massachusetts Bay.

Despite its relative success, the magazine ceased in March 1775. "The general distress and commotion in the town, occasioned by the operation of the act of the British parliament to blockade the port of Boston, obliged him to discontinue it ... much to the injury of his pecuniary interest." The Royal American Magazine was "the last of the periodicals of Boston under the provincial governors."

== Image gallery ==
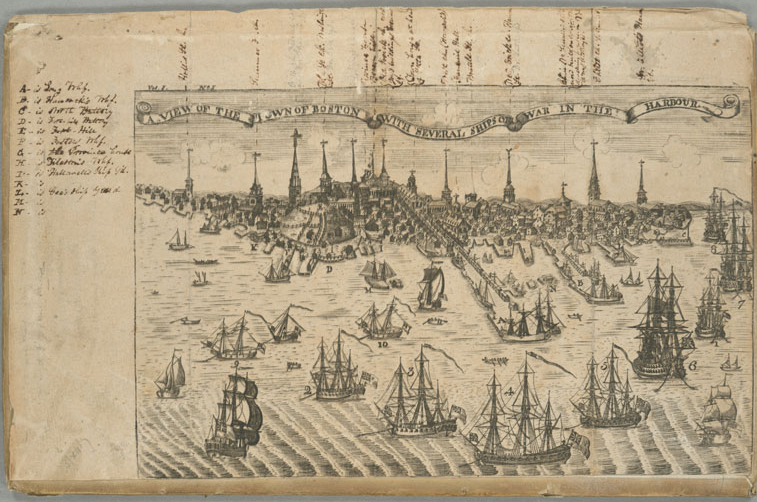
"A view of the town of Boston with several ships of war in the harbour" by Paul Revere, in Royal American Magazine, January 1774.

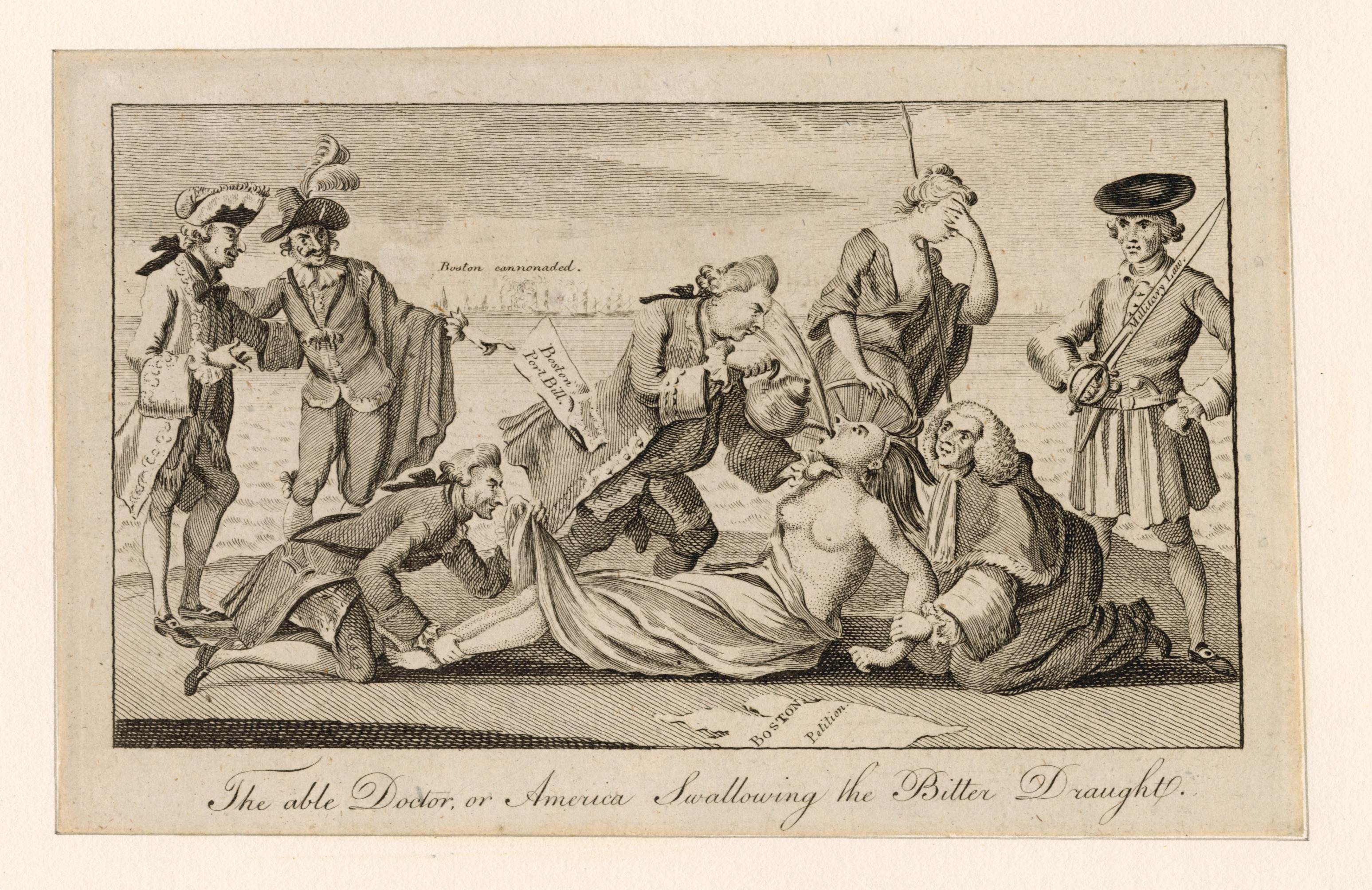
"The able doctor, or American swallowing the bitter draught" by Paul Revere, in Royal American Magazine, January 1774.

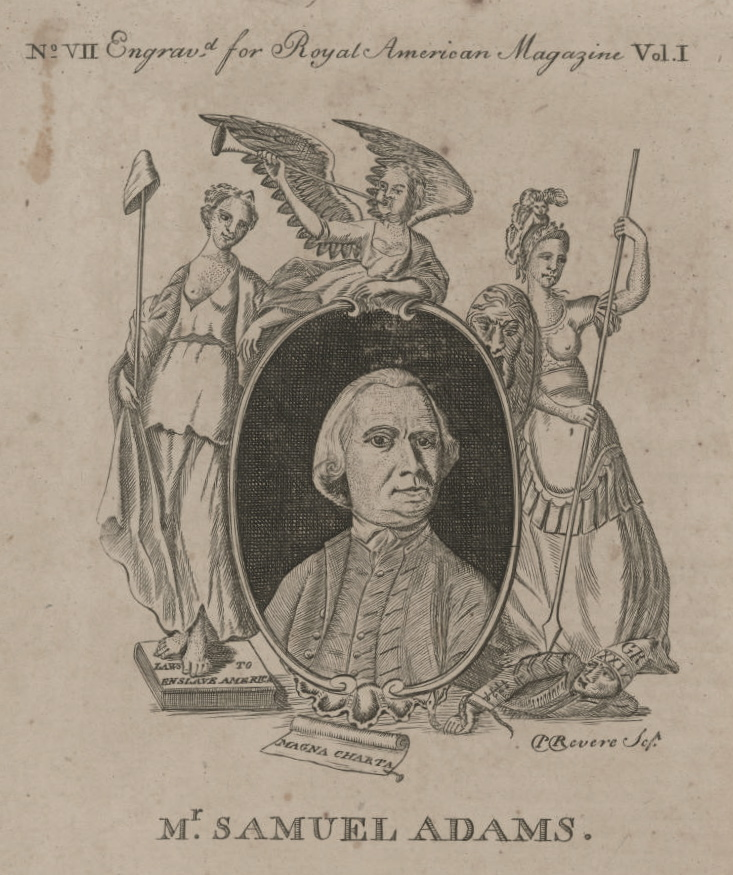
Portrait of Samuel Adams

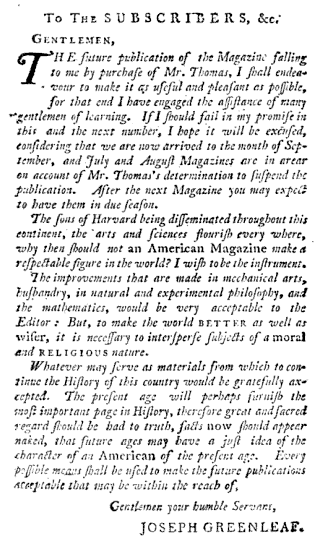
Greenleaf's letter to subscribers, ca.June 1774

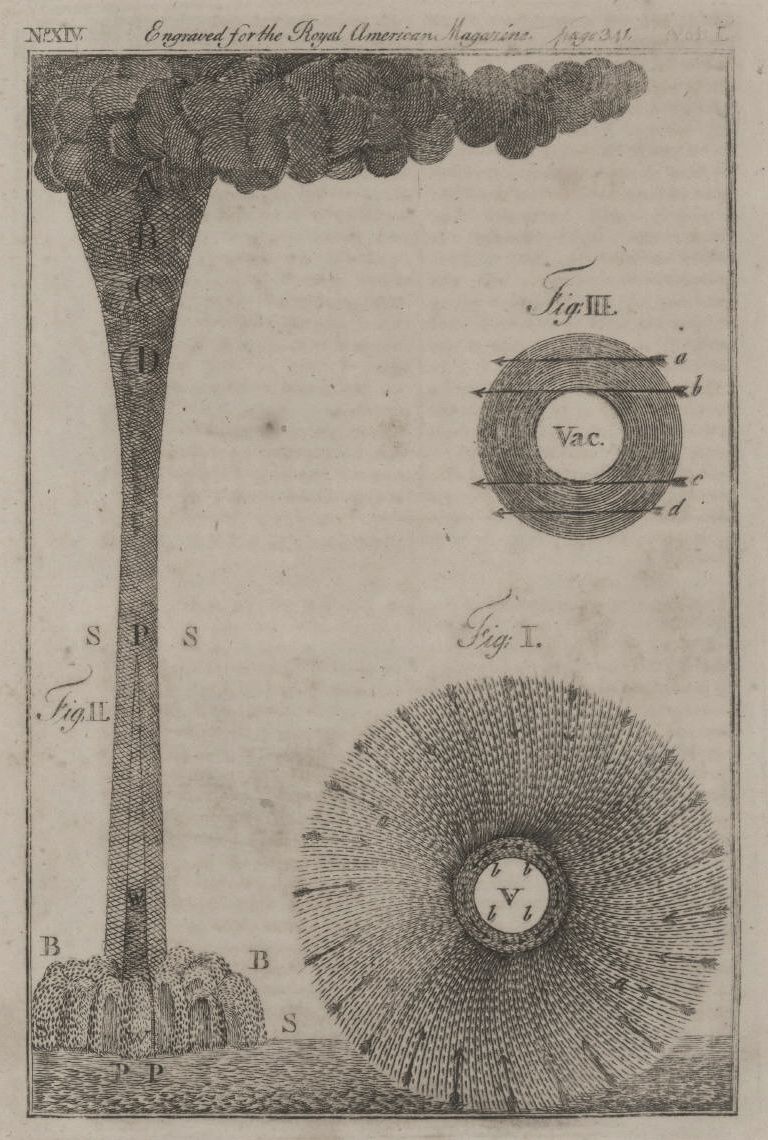
Copy after illustration originally published in Benjamin Franklin's Experiments and Observations on Electricity, London, 1774; in Royal American Magazine, Sept. 1774.

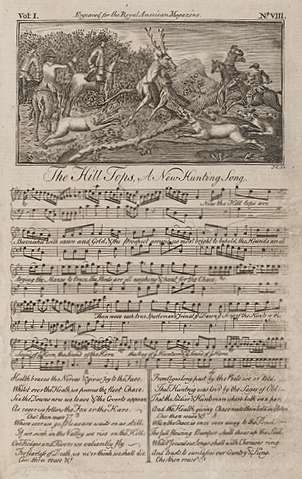
"The Hill Tops, a New Hunting Song," in Royal American Magazine no.8.

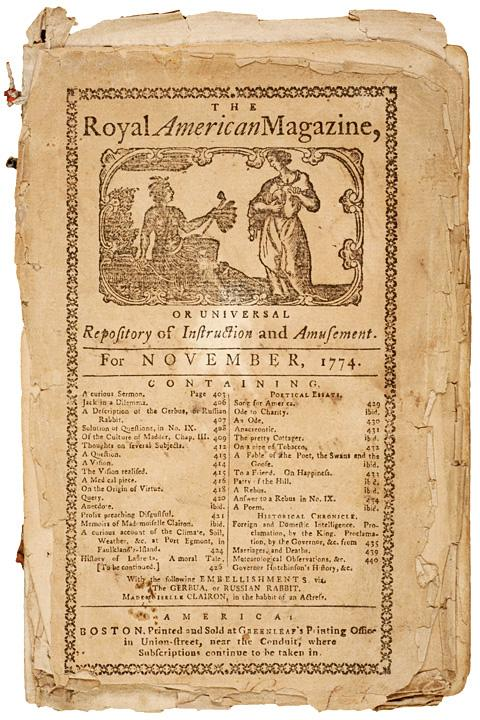
Royal American Magazine, November 1774, "printed and sold at Greeleaf's printing office in Union-Street," Boston

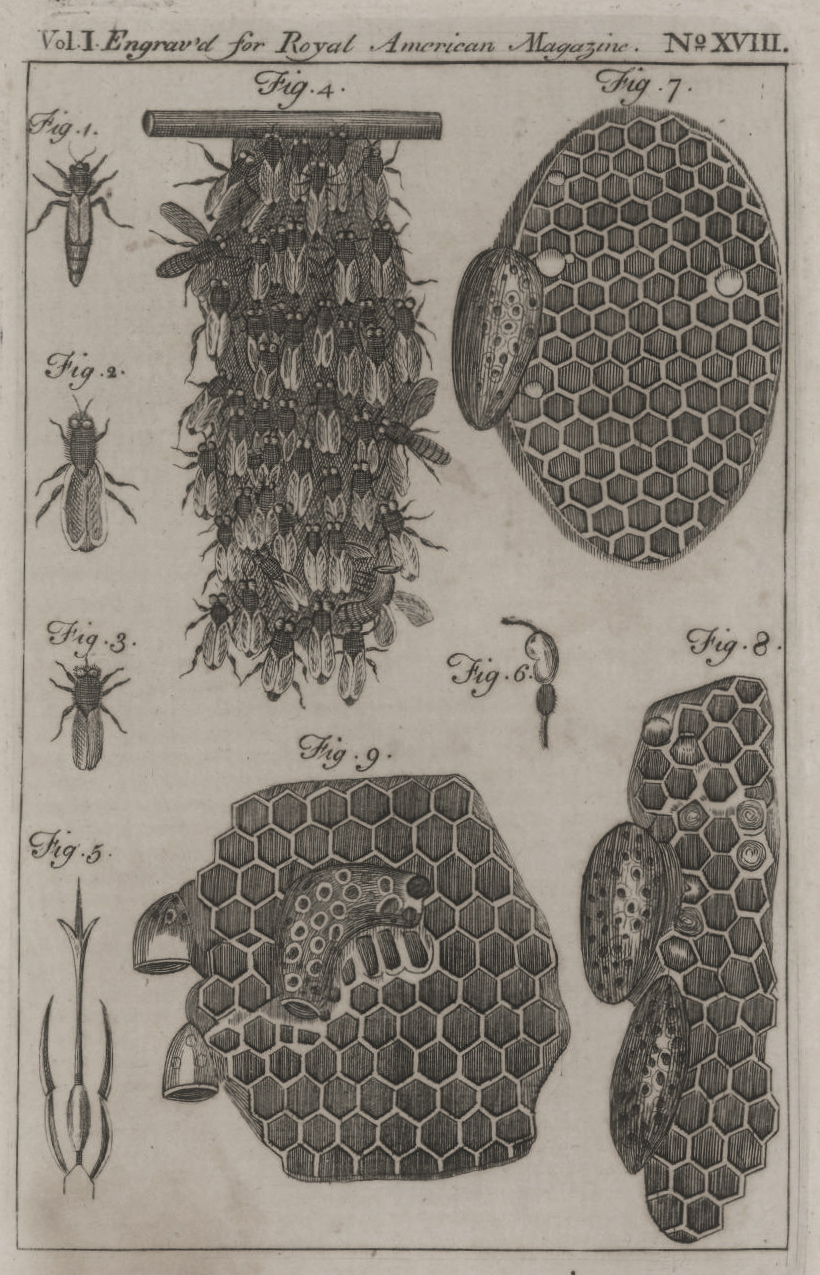
Copy after illustration originally published in Universal Magazine, June 1768; in Royal American Magazine, December 1774.
