= Benjamin Harris (publisher) =

American journalist

Benjamin Harris (fl. 1673–1716) was an English publisher, a figure of the Popish Plot in England who then moved to New England as an early journalist. He published the New England Primer, the first textbook in British America, and edited the first multi-page newspaper there, Publick Occurrences Both Foreign and Domestick, from 25 September 1690.

== Life ==
His career in London, as a publisher of Whig books, pamphlets, and a newspaper is known from 1673. Many of his publications were anti-Catholic. He published the pamphlet Appeal from the Country to the City in 1679 by Charles Blount, opposing the succession of James, Duke of York, and was consequently convicted of sedition and ordered to pay a fine he could not afford. Released from prison, Harris resumed his anti-Catholic campaigning. From 1679 to 1681, Harris published a paper that displayed an early use of local news, Domestic Intelligence: Or News both from City and Country.

He moved to Boston in 1686 to start the London Coffee House, which provided both men and women (unusual at the time) access to foreign newspapers and books. After publishing The New-England Primer (c.1690) and Tulley’s Almanach, he set out to publish a newspaper (Mindich). Publick Occurrences Both Forreign and Domestick had three pages of text, with the fourth page left blank for others to write in pieces of news to hand around. It focused on local news, and included gossip; one item concerned King William's War and atrocities attributed to Native American forces allied to the British, current in September 1690. Without a license, it was closed down after a single issue, Harris was jailed, and the next newspaper did not appear until 1704 when John Campbell's Boston News-Letter was the first American newspaper to last beyond the first issue.

From 1690 to 1695, Harris continued to run his coffeehouse and publish books. He joined another partner, John Allen in partnership. In 1692, he received the official assignment to print The Acts and Laws of Massachusetts in 1692 (Mindich). Harris was also active in community service, supporting homeless shelters and orphanages.

He returned to London in 1695. He started a series of short-lived newspapers before publishing the London Post from 1699 to 1706. He sold his paper, books, and almanacs from his printing shop and store. The location and date of Harris's death are unknown. He was married with two sons.

== See also ==
- List of early American publishers and printers

== Sources ==
- Copeland, David A. (2000). Debating the issues in colonial newspapers : primary documents on events of the period. Westport, Conn. : Greenwood Press. ISBN 978-0-3133-09823.
- Biography Resource Center. Farmington Hills, Mich.: Thomas Gale. 2006.
- “Harris, Benjamin”, Encyclopædia Britannica. 2006. Encyclopædia Britannica Online. 27 Nov. 2006
- Mindich, David T.Z. “Harris, Benjamin”, American National Biography Online, Feb. 2000
- Mark Knights, ‘Harris, Benjamin (c.1647–1720)’, Oxford Dictionary of National Biography, Oxford University Press, 2004; online edn, Jan 2008
