= Massachusetts Spy =

Patriot newspaper in colonial Boston, Massachusetts

The Massachusetts Spy
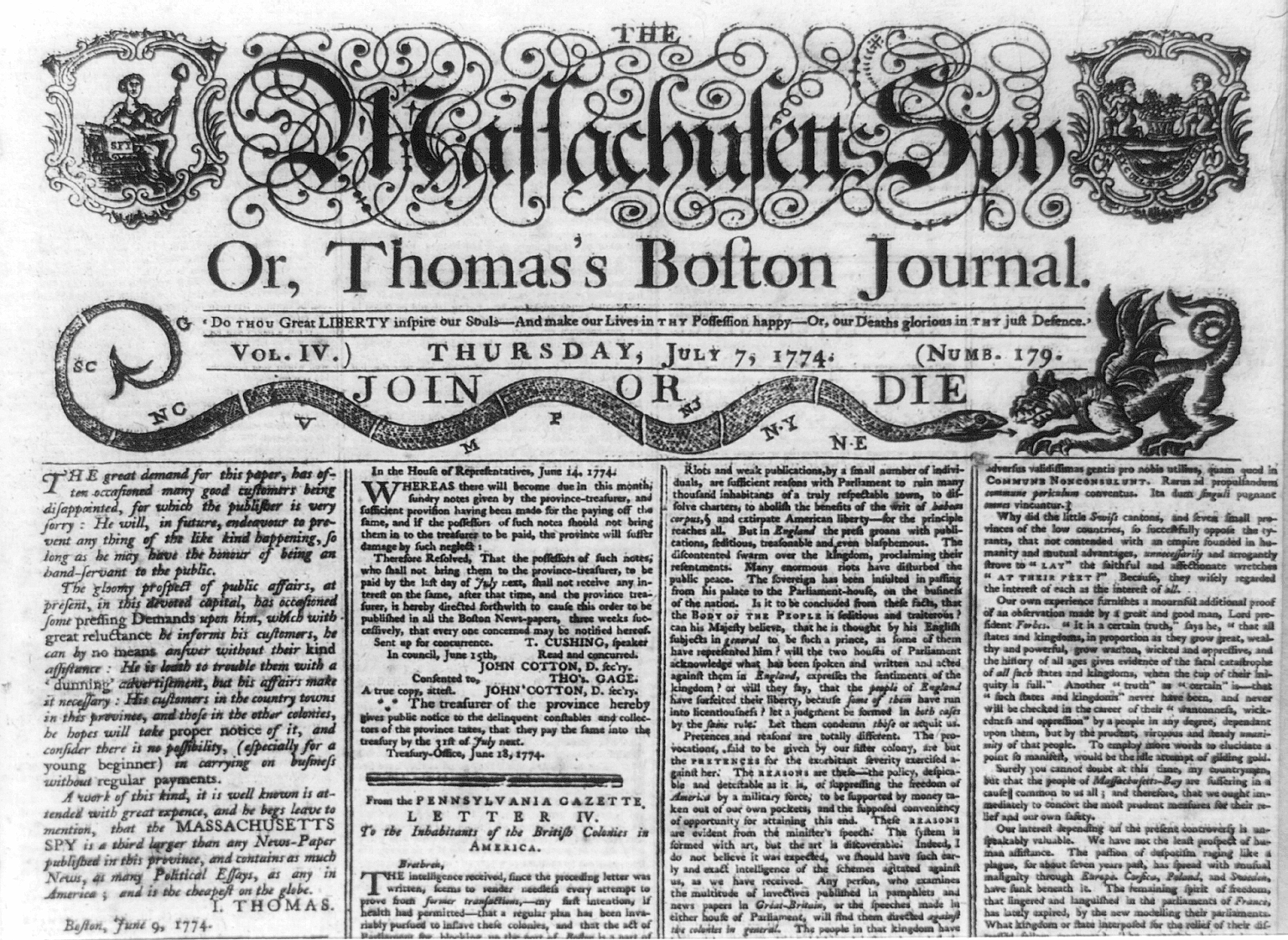
- Massachusetts Spy, July 7, 1774
- Founder: Isaiah Thomas
- Founded: 1770
- Political alignment: Revolutionary
- City: Boston, Massachusetts; Worcester, Massachusetts
- Country: United States

The Massachusetts Spy, later subtitled the Worcester Gazette, (est. 1770) was a newspaper published by Isaiah Thomas in Boston and Worcester, Massachusetts, in the 18th century.

The newspaper was heavily political and found itself constantly on the verge of being suppressed by the British colonial government, from the time of its establishment in 1770 to 1776 and through the beginning of the American Revolution.

== History ==
In 1771–1773, the Spy featured the essays of several anonymous political commentators who called themselves "Centinel," "Mucius Scaevola" and "Leonidas." They spoke in the same terms about similar issues, kept Patriot polemics on the front page, and supported each other against attacks in pro-government papers. Rhetorical combat was a Patriot tactic that explained the issues of the day and fostered cohesiveness without advocating outright rebellion. The columnists spoke to the colonists as an independent people tied to Britain only by voluntary legal compact. The Spy soon carried radicalism to its logical conclusion.

When articles from the Spy were reprinted in other papers, the country as a whole was ready for Thomas Paine's Common Sense, which was published in 1776. The newspaper had to be relocated from the third floor of today's Union Oyster House in Boston to Worcester, Massachusetts, "after the April 6, 1775 issue" just before the Battles of Lexington and Concord and the subsequent Siege of Boston to prevent the arrest of the publisher and printers and the presses from being seized and destroyed by the British; it resumed publication in Worcester on 3 May 1775.

The paper was later published by the son of Isaiah Thomas, Isaiah Thomas, Jr., and continued under similar names and different owners until some time in the first decades of the 19th century.
