= Black-letter law =

Well-established legal rules

In common law legal systems, black-letter law refers to well-established legal rules that are no longer subject to reasonable dispute. Black-letter law can be contrasted with legal theory or unsettled legal issues.

== Etymology ==
The phrase derives from the historic blackletter script and typeface that originated in Europe during the Middle Ages. It became particularly associated with English court documents in the 17th century.

== Historical usage ==
=== 'Trite law' ===
In the 15th-century case of T Pasch, Chief Justice Thomas Bryan described the principle that people cannot be prosecuted for their thoughts alone as "trite law," in the sense that this doctrine was well-established and obvious.

=== 'Black-letter law' ===
The phrase 'black-letter law' was, in the late 18th and early 19th centuries, used to critique textualists and promote purposive interpretations of evidence.

In 1783, Hervey Redmond Morres, member of the Irish House of Lords, used the phrase during a debate about the legality of the Irish Volunteers militia. He argued that "even if [the militia was] not authorised by... black letter law, they had an higher law for their foundation, self-preservation, that greatest and first of laws." In a 1797 biography of Judge William Murray, English barrister John Holliday praised an instance of Murray applying "common sense against the black-letter-law." That same year, Scottish writer George Chalmers published an essay on the Ireland Shakespeare forgeries that criticised historians who relied on the "black-letter law" of formal records while dismissing contextual evidence.

In the United States, the term was first used in a legal context by the Supreme Court in 1831. Justice William Johnson opined: "It is seldom that a case in our time savours so much of the black letter; but the course of decisions in New York renders it unavoidable."

== Modern usage ==
In modern usage, the phrase is used to refer to "well-established legal rules that are certain," and "no longer disputable" or "no longer subject to reasonable dispute."

=== Synonymous phrases ===
In the United States, 'black-letter law' is synonymous with the phrases 'hornbook law' or 'settled law.' In Commonwealth jurisdictions, the phrase 'trite law' is used to refer to a legal principle that is obvious or well-established.

== Examples ==
What is considered black-letter law is dependent upon region or jurisdiction. Examples of black-letter law in common law jurisdictions include the fundamentals of contracts, which must have an offer, acceptance, and consideration. The first two elements are similarly required in most civil law jurisdictions; consideration, however, is not.

In federalist countries, what is considered to be black-letter law may also differ by administrative area. In most of Canada, it is "trite law" that an employer is liable for wrongful dismissal when they fire an employee without sufficient notice. However, this is not always the case in Alberta.
