= Massachusetts School Laws =

Colonial American legislation

The Massachusetts School Laws were three legislative acts of 1642, 1647 and 1648 enacted in the Massachusetts Bay Colony. The most famous by far is the law of 1647, also known as the Old Deluder Satan Law (after the law's first sentence) and The General School Law of 1642. These laws are commonly regarded as the historical first step toward compulsory government-directed public education in the United States of America. Shortly after they passed, similar laws were enacted in the other New England colonies. Most mid-Atlantic colonies followed suit, though in some Southern colonies it was a further century before publicly funded schools were established there.

== Education provision prior to the 1647 Act ==
The law was one of a series of legislative acts directed at public education in the colony. The first Massachusetts School Law of 1642 broke with English tradition by transferring educational supervision from the clergy to the selectmen of the colony, empowering them to assess the education of children "to read & understand the principles of religion and the capital laws of this country." It held parents and masters responsible for their children's and apprentices' ability to read and write, stressing education rather than schooling. However, its implementation appears to have been somewhat neglected. Probably in response to this, the 1647 law was enacted by the Massachusetts General Court to impel the towns of the colony to found, operate and fund schools.

== Framing and provisions of the Acts ==
The 1647 legislation specifically framed ignorance as a Satanic ill to be circumvented through the education of the country's young people. It required every town having more than 50 families to hire a teacher, and every town of more than 100 families to establish a "grammar school". Failure to comply with the mandate would result in a fine of £5. The grammar school clause was intended to prepare students to attend Harvard College, whose mission was to prepare young men for the ministry.

The rationale for the law reflected the Calvinist Puritan ethos of the time and in particular the influence of the Reverend John Cotton, who was a teacher in the First Church of Boston and one of the Massachusetts Bay Colony's most influential leaders. The Puritans sought to create a literate population to ensure that, as the law put it, "ye ould deluder, Satan" could not use illiteracy to "keepe men from the knowledge of ye Scriptures." Their religious beliefs emphasized the view that personal knowledge of the Scriptures was an essential requirement for temporal living and eternal salvation. The statute also endorsed the principle that the interpretation of the Scriptures should be done under the aegis of proper authority, namely the Puritan leaders, in order to avoid "false glosses of saint seeming deceivers".

A further piece of educational legislation was passed in 1648, addressing and extending the schooling requirements set out in the 1642 law. It stipulated that children and apprentices, under the authority of parents or masters, were to be taught reading, the public laws, the catechism and "some honest lawful calling, labour or employment." Selectmen were to act as supervisors of the population, conducting examinations and if necessary fining parents or placing the young with other masters if their education was neglected.

The practical implementation of the educational laws appears to have been distinctly inconsistent. By the end of the 1650s, all eight of the 100-family towns and a third of the 50-family towns had met the respective requirements for grammar schools and the hiring of teachers. However, the remainder of the towns and many new towns ignored both mandates and instead paid the fine. The Massachusetts Civil Code of 1660 reiterated the school laws, but still met with a lack of implementation; to enforce it, a fresh act was passed in 1668.

In 1701 the Massachusetts General Court passed a law that stated, "No minister of any town shall be deemed, held, or accepted to be the school-master of such town." The result, according to historian Howard K, Beale, was that, "it deprived the towns of their best educated teachers."

== Text of the Massachusetts School Law of 1642 ==
This Cort, taking into consideration the great neglect of many parents & masters in training up their children in learning & labor, & other implyments which may be proffitable to the common wealth, do hereupon order and decree, that in euery towne ye chosen men appointed for managing the prudentiall affajres of the same shall henceforth stand charged with the care of the redresse of this evill, so as they shalbee sufficiently punished by fines for the neglect thereof, upon presentment of the grand iury, or other information or complaint in any Court within this iurisdiction; and for this end they, or the greater number of them, shall have power to take account from time to time of all parents and masters, and of their children, concerning their calling and implyment of their children, especially of their ability to read & understand the principles of religion & the capitall lawes of this country, and to impose fines upon such as shall refuse to render such accounts to them when they shall be required; and they shall have power, with consent of any Court or the magistrate, to put forth apprentices the children of such as they shall (find) not to be able & fitt to employ and bring them up. They shall take … that boyes and girles be not suffered to converse together, so as may occasion any wanton, dishonest, or immodest behavior; & for their better performance of this trust committed to them, they may divide the towne amongst them, appointing to every of the said townesmen a certaine number of families to have special oversight of. They are also to provide that a sufficient quantity of materialls, as hemp, flaxe, ecra, may be raised in their severall townes, & tooles & implements provided for working out the same; & for their assistance in this so needfull and beneficiall imploymt, if they meete wth any difficulty or opposition wch they cannot well master by their own power, they may have recorse to some of the matrats, who shall take such course for their help & incuragmt as the occasion shall require according to iustice; & the said townesmen, at the next Cort in those limits, after the end of their year, shall give a briefe account in writing of their proceedings herein, provided that they have bene so required by some Cort or magistrate a month at least before; & this order to continew for two yeares, & till the Cort shall take further order.

== Text of the Massachusetts General School Law of 1647 ==
It being one chief project of that old deluder, Satan, to keep men from the knowledge of the Scriptures, as in former times by keeping them in an unknown tongue, so in these latter times by persuading from the use of tongues, that so that at least the true sense and meaning of the original might be clouded and corrupted with love and false glosses of saint-seeming deceivers; and to the end that learning may not be buried in the grave of our forefathers, in church and commonwealth, the Lord assisting our endeavors.

It is therefore ordered that every township in this jurisdiction, after the Lord hath increased them to fifty households shall forthwith appoint one within their town to teach all such children as shall resort to him to write and read, whose wages shall be paid either by the parents or masters of such children, or by the inhabitants in general, by way of supply, as the major part of those that order the prudentials of the town shall appoint; provided those that send their children be not oppressed by paying much more than they can have them taught for in other towns.

And it is further ordered, that when any town shall increase to the number of one hundred families or householders, they shall set up a grammar school, the master thereof being able to instruct youth so far as they may be fitted for the university, provided that if any town neglect the performance hereof above one year that every such town shall pay 5 pounds to the next school till they shall perform this order.
