= Isaiah Thomas (publisher) =

American printer, newspaper publisher and author (1749–1831)

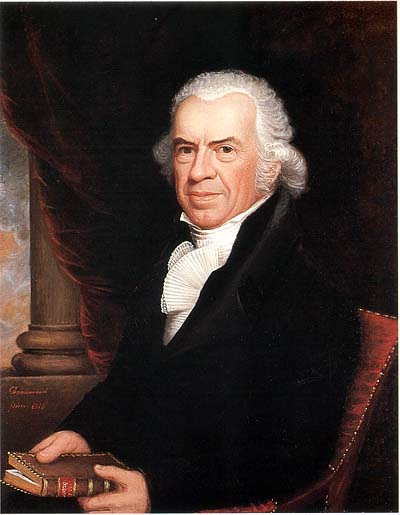
- Oil on canvas by Ethan Allen Greenwood in 1818 (American Antiquarian Society)
- Born: January 19, 1749; Boston, Province of Massachusetts Bay
- Died: April 4, 1831 (aged 82)
- Resting place: Rural Cemetery, Worcester, Massachusetts

Signature
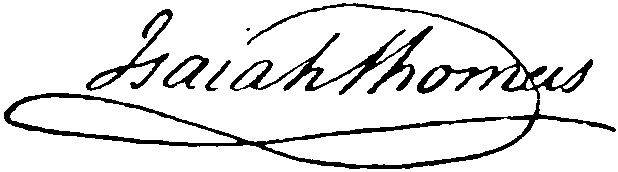

Isaiah Thomas (January 19, 1749 – April 4, 1831) was an early American printer, newspaper publisher and author. He performed the first public reading of the Declaration of Independence in Worcester, Massachusetts, and reported the first account of the Battles of Lexington and Concord. He was the founder of the American Antiquarian Society.

== Biography ==
=== Early life and career ===
Thomas was born in Boston, Massachusetts. He was apprenticed on July 7, 1756, to Zechariah Fowle, a Boston printer, with whom, after working as a printer in Halifax, Portsmouth (New Hampshire) and Charleston (South Carolina), he formed a partnership in 1770.

=== The Massachusetts Spy ===
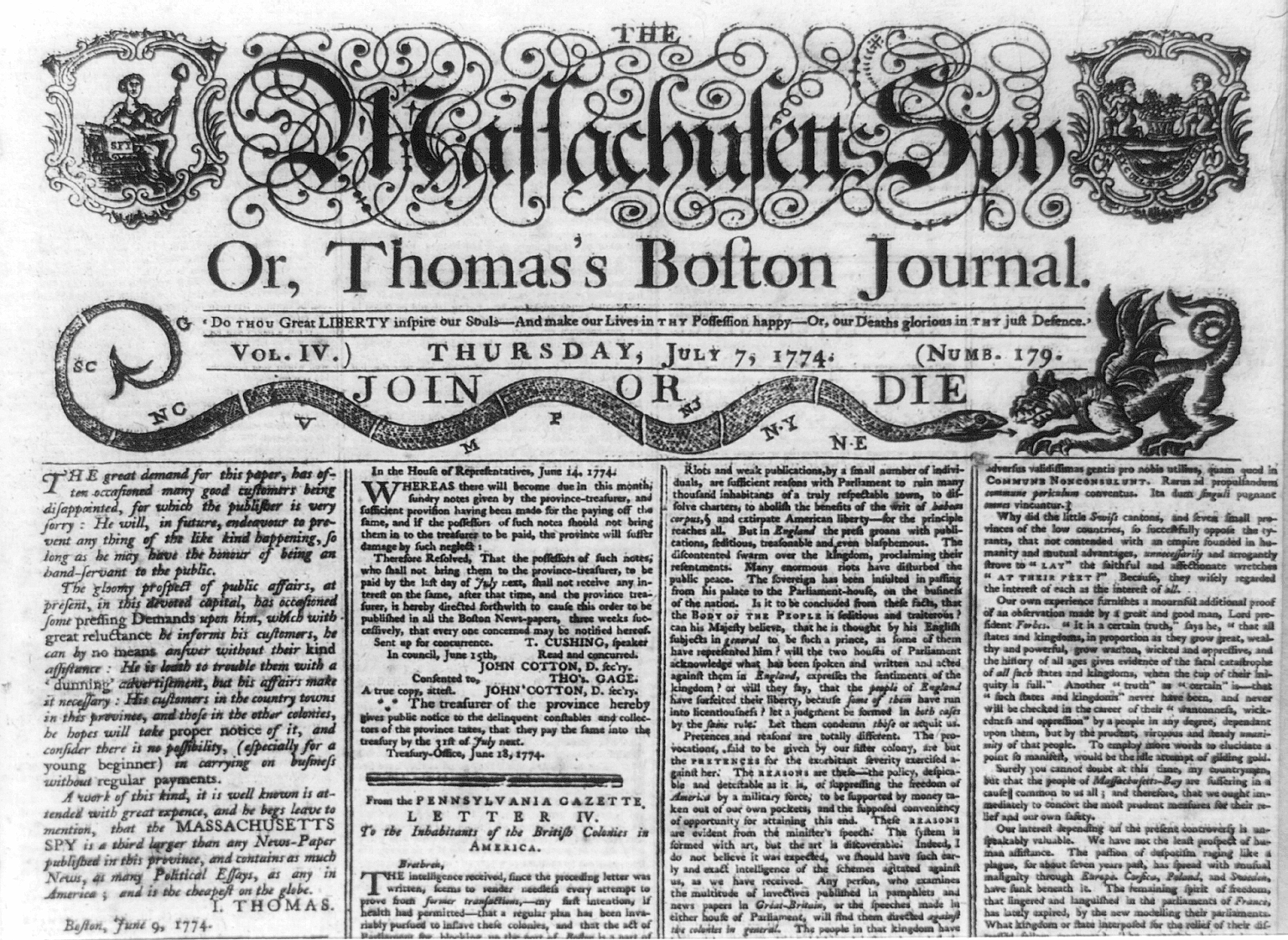
Masthead of July 7, 1774 issue

The partnership was formed to publish the Massachusetts Spy, and lasted for three months, after which Thomas continued publication alone. For the paper's motto, he chose "Open to all parties, but influenced by none." Initially it came out three times each week, then (under his sole ownership) as a semi-weekly, and beginning in 1771, as a weekly. The paper soon espoused the Whig cause and was the object of government efforts to suppress it. In 1771 Governor Thomas Hutchinson ordered the attorney general to prosecute Thomas, but the grand jury failed to find cause for indictment.

In Boston, in 1774, Thomas published the Royal American Magazine, which was continued for a short time by Joseph Greenleaf, and which contained many engravings by Paul Revere.

=== Escape to Worcester ===
Wary of the Tories' growing resentment of the independence of the Spy, on April 16, 1775 (three days before the Battle of Lexington, in which he took part), Thomas took his presses from Boston and set them up in Worcester. His other property was destroyed. In Worcester, he published and sold books, built a paper mill and book-bindery, and continued the paper until 1802 save for gaps in 1776–1778 and in 1786–1788. The Spy supported George Washington and the Federalist Party. He was also postmaster for a time.

Thomas married Mary Fowle, described as a "half-cousin", on May 26, 1779. Around 1802, Thomas gave his Worcester business over to his son, including the control of the Spy.

=== Later life ===
Coat of Arms of Isaiah Thomas

From 1775 until 1803, Thomas published the New England Almanac, continued until 1819 by his son, Isaiah Thomas Jr. It had something of the flavor of Benjamin Franklin's Poor Richard's Almanack. In 1786 he procured from Europe the first font of music type that was brought to the United States, and he was the first printer in the U.S. to use such type. He was engaged at Walpole, New Hampshire, in book publishing and printing the Farmer's Museum, and in 1788 opened a bookstore in Boston under the firm name of Thomas and Andrews, also establishing branches of his publishing business in several parts of the United States. The monthly Massachusetts Magazine was published by the firm, with Ebenezer T. Andrews, in eight volumes, from 1789 until 1796. At Worcester he printed a folio edition of the Bible in 1791, Watts' Psalms and Hymns, and most of the Bibles and school books that were used in the U.S. at that date.

His ambition throughout his life was to write an extensive book on the history of publishing. He began what would become History of Printing in America in 1808. Fully titled History of Printing in America, with a Biography of Printers, and an Account of Newspapers, it was published in two volumes in 1810. A second edition, published in 1874, was prepared by his grandson Benjamin Franklin Thomas and included a catalog of American publications previous to 1776 and a memoir of Isaiah Thomas.

In November 1812, Thomas founded the American Society of Antiquaries, now known as the American Antiquarian Society, partly to take care of the extensive library he had accumulated in preparing his history of publishing. At its first meeting, Thomas was elected president, a role he held until his death. In addition to nearly 8,000 volumes from his collection, he gave to its library tracts, and one of the most valuable files of newspapers in the country, and he presented land and a hall, with a provision equal to $24,000 for its maintenance. In 1816, Thomas was elected a member of the American Philosophical Society in Philadelphia.

Thomas spent his final days in Worcester. Upon his death in 1831, he bequeathed his entire library, his collection of early American newspapers, as well as his personal papers and records to the American Antiquarian Society.

Thomas is interred at Rural Cemetery in Worcester.

== Legacy ==
Thomas's grandson B. F. Thomas noted his grandfather's importance in founding the American Antiquarian Society. "He saw and understood, no man better, from what infinitely varied and minute sources the history of a nation's life was to be drawn; that the only safe rule was to gather up all the fragments so that nothing be lost." In 1943, Publishers Weekly created the Carey-Thomas Award for creative publishing, named in honor of Mathew Carey and Isaiah Thomas.

At a meeting of the American Antiquarian Society held in Worcester on April 15, 1981, the legacy of Thomas was characterized by Marcus A. McCorison as establishing a library on revolutionary principles, one preserving democratic literature and the written materials of a culture in which all sorts of ideas freely circulate and from which precipitate new ideas of the true and beautiful.

== See also ==
- William Goddard (publisher)
- History of American newspapers
- John Holt (publisher)
- William Parks (publisher)
