= Hornbook =

Medieval alphabet teaching aid

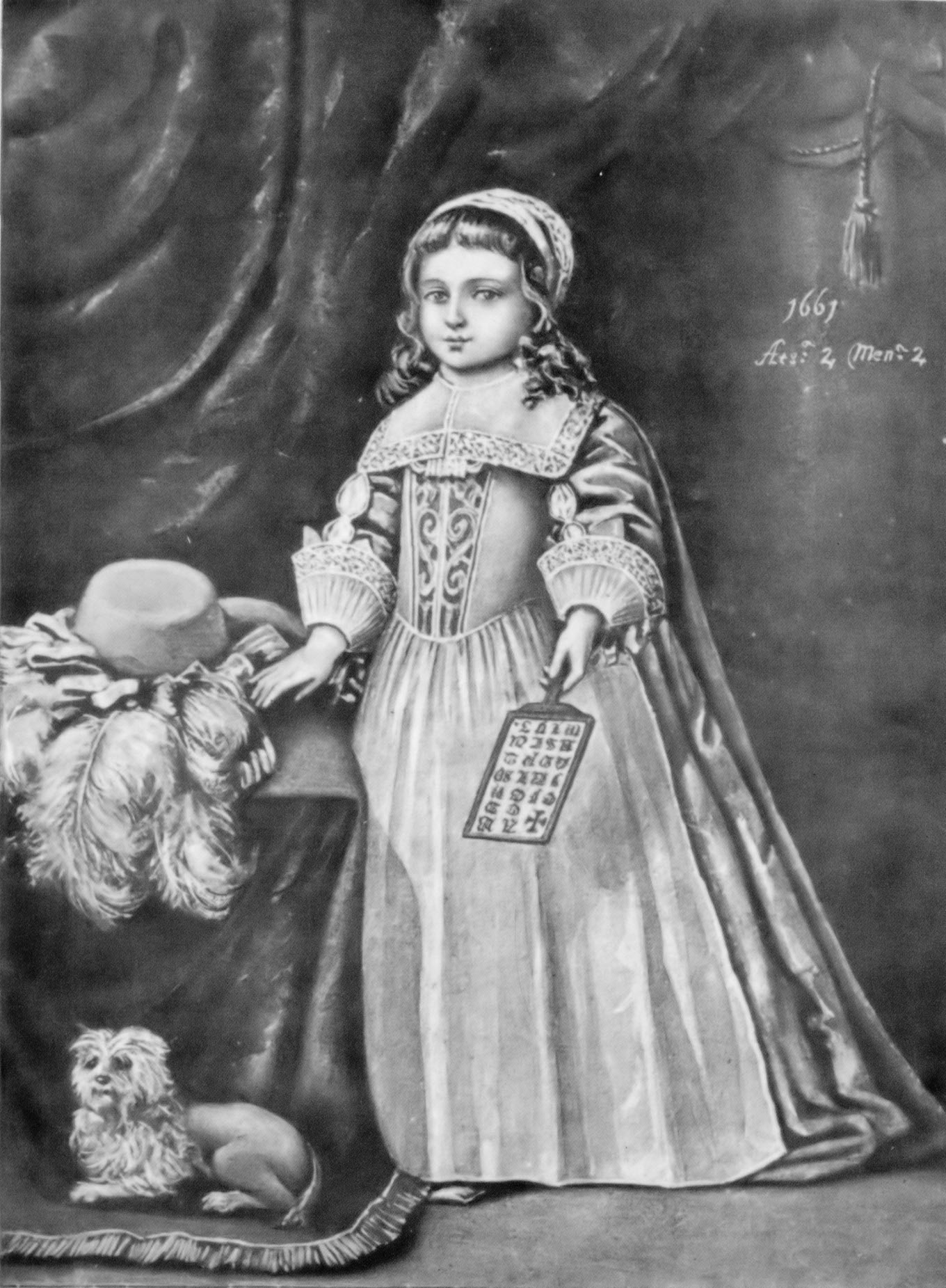
Miss Campion holding a hornbook, 1661. From Tuer's History of the Horn-Book.

A hornbook (horn-book) is a single-sided alphabet tablet, which served from medieval times as a primer for study, and sometimes included vowel combinations, numerals or short verse. The hornbook was in common use in England around 1450, but may have originated more than a century earlier. The term (hornbook) has been applied to different study materials in different fields but owes its origin to children's education, represented by a sheet of vellum or paper displaying the alphabet, religious verse, etc., protected with a translucent covering of horn (or mica) and attached to a frame provided with a handle.

== History ==
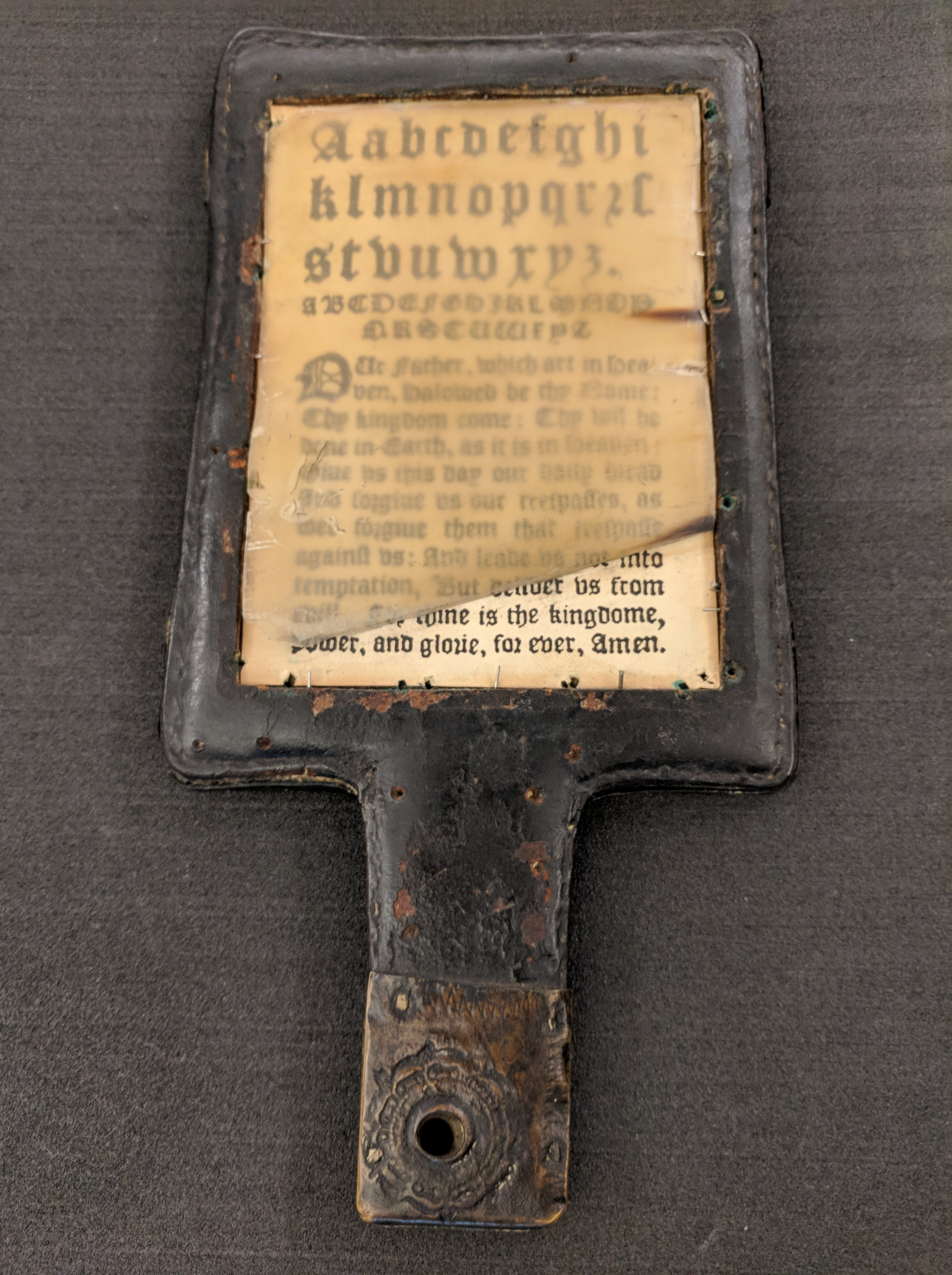
Leather hornbook in the Cary Graphic Arts Collection

Horn books, battledore books and crisscross books were all tablets designed primarily to teach the alphabet to children laid out as an abecedarium, the elementary method of teaching used from Antiquity to the Middle Ages where letters of the alphabet were taught by rote. An illustration of a hornbook from 1326 appears in a richly illuminated vellum manuscript (Liber de Officiis Regum, by Walter de Wilemete) but the earliest recorded reference (to a "boke of horn") is in 1450. Wooden hornbook primers were in common use by children from the mid-15th century to late 18th century, evolving in to battledore books (mid-18th to mid-19th century), crisscross books, finally displaced by cardboard ABC books in the 19th century.

Hornbooks consist of a lesson sheet illustrating the letters of the alphabet, mounted on a paddle of wood, bone, leather, silver, lead alloy or stone and protected by a thin sheet of translucent horn, (Note: Opaque horn was worked to make it translucent) or mica, (Note: Historically, writers referred to mica as "talc". The sheet mica used in hornbooks are likely to be Muscovite, or Muscovy-glass, a name given to the mineral in Elizabethan England due to its use in medieval Russia (Muscovy) as a cheaper alternative to glass in windows) held in place by narrow brass strips (latten) tacked through the horn to the paddle to protect the lesson sheet. The paddle often had a handle with a hole for a cord or ribbon suspended from the child's girdle at their waist. The lesson sheet, which was first of vellum and later of paper, were typically inscribed with a large cross, (Note: from which the hornbook was called the Christ Cross Row, or criss-cross row.) followed by alphabet letters, (Note: Early hornbooks lack the letters "J" and "U.") numbers and in later version, short verse. Hornbooks displayed letters of the alphabet, a syllabary and prayers for novice readers. Andrew Tuer described a typical hornbook with a line separating the lower case and capital letters from the syllabary. This syllabarium or syllabary, likely added to the hornbook in 1596, taught pronunciations of vowel and consonant combinations.

ab eb ib ob ub ba be bi bo bu

These syllables are possible ancestors to the modern instructional practice of new readers working with onsets and rimes in word families. From the first hornbook, the alphabet format cemented the learning progression from syllables to words. The inscriptions appear either in block print (illustrated upper left), best suited for learning to read or hand-written (illustrated lower right), best suited for learning to write.

== Present ==
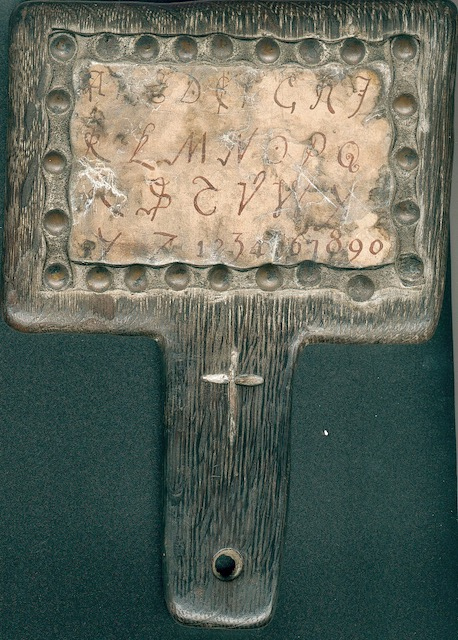
A 19th-century replica of a Late Tudor oak Hornbook

The memory of "hornbooks" in modern culture has faded partly because of the extreme scarcity of original exemplars as they fell out of use. (Note: When technological advances displace utility objects, their value in advancing that technology is often lost as better and more desirable utilities replaced them. Even as early as 1651, some educationalists scorned the use of hornbooks (Bailey 2013, p. 11), so it is not surprising that few contemporaries recognise the value of incipient posterity) Hornbooks were educational tools for children, but children often repurposed them as toys or rackets (battledores), which contributed to the lack of surviving examples. By the time that antiquarians noticed their scarcity in the 19th century, most had been destroyed. Those few authentic hornbooks in existence today are preserved either because of their intrinsic value (their owners were rich and famous e.g. Queen Elizabeth I), or because they were mislaid by their owners, lost beneath floor-boards, behind panelling, lodged in thatched rafters, or more recently buried, in various states of preservation. The rarity of hornbooks increased their value in the 19th century, which when combined with gaps in knowledge, opened the doors to counterfeit. Even the name itself (hornbook) has been appropriated, becoming synonymous with child education (e.g. The Horn Book Magazine), as a benchmark for essential education (e.g. Hornbook (law)), or used as a pejorative term (e.g. poorly educated). Today, there are certainly many more "spurious" hornbooks in circulation than genuine but, in the absence of verified exemplars, skilled counterfeit can be hard to discount.

=== Memory preserved in art ===
Images of hornbooks are variously preserved in the margins of old manuscripts, as a prop in portraiture (illustrated above) or referred to in verse:

- The hornbook is mentioned in William Shakespeare's Love's Labour's Lost (written in the mid-1590s), act 5, scene 1, where Moth refers to the ba, the a, e, i, o, u, and the horn:

ARMADO. [To HOLOFERNES] Monsieur, are you not lett'red?
MOTH. Yes, he teaches boys the hornbook. What is a, b, spelt backward with the horn on his head?
HOLOFERNES. Ba, pueritia, with a horn added.
MOTH. Ba, most silly sheep with a horn. You hear his learning.
HOLOFERNES. Quis, quis, thou consonant?
MOTH. The third of the five vowels, if You repeat them; or the fifth, if I.
HOLOFERNES. I will repeat them: a, e, i—
MOTH. The sheep; the other two concludes it: o, u.

- Ben Jonson also describes it in his play Volpone (1605–06), act 4, scene 2:

CORVINO: ... And yet I hope that I may say, these eyes
Have seen her glued unto that piece of cedar,
That fine well-timber'd gallant; and that here
The letters may be read, through the horn,
That make the story perfect.

- Attributed to William Hornby, an English poet in 1622:

Even so the Hornbooke is the seede and graine
Of skill, by which we learning first obtained :
And though it be accounted small of many,
And haply bought for twopence or a penny.
Yet will the teaching somewhat costly be
Ere they attain unto the full degree
Of scholarship and art.

- Robert Burns, in his poem Death and Doctor Hornbook (1785), refers to a local schoolmaster with a sideline as an apothecary, as Doctor Hornbook.

=== Use in United States legal education ===
In United States law, a hornbook is a text that gives an overview of a particular area of law. A law hornbook is a type of treatise, usually one volume, which could be a briefer version of a longer, multi-volume treatise. Students in American law schools often use hornbooks as supplements to casebooks.
