= History of American newspapers =

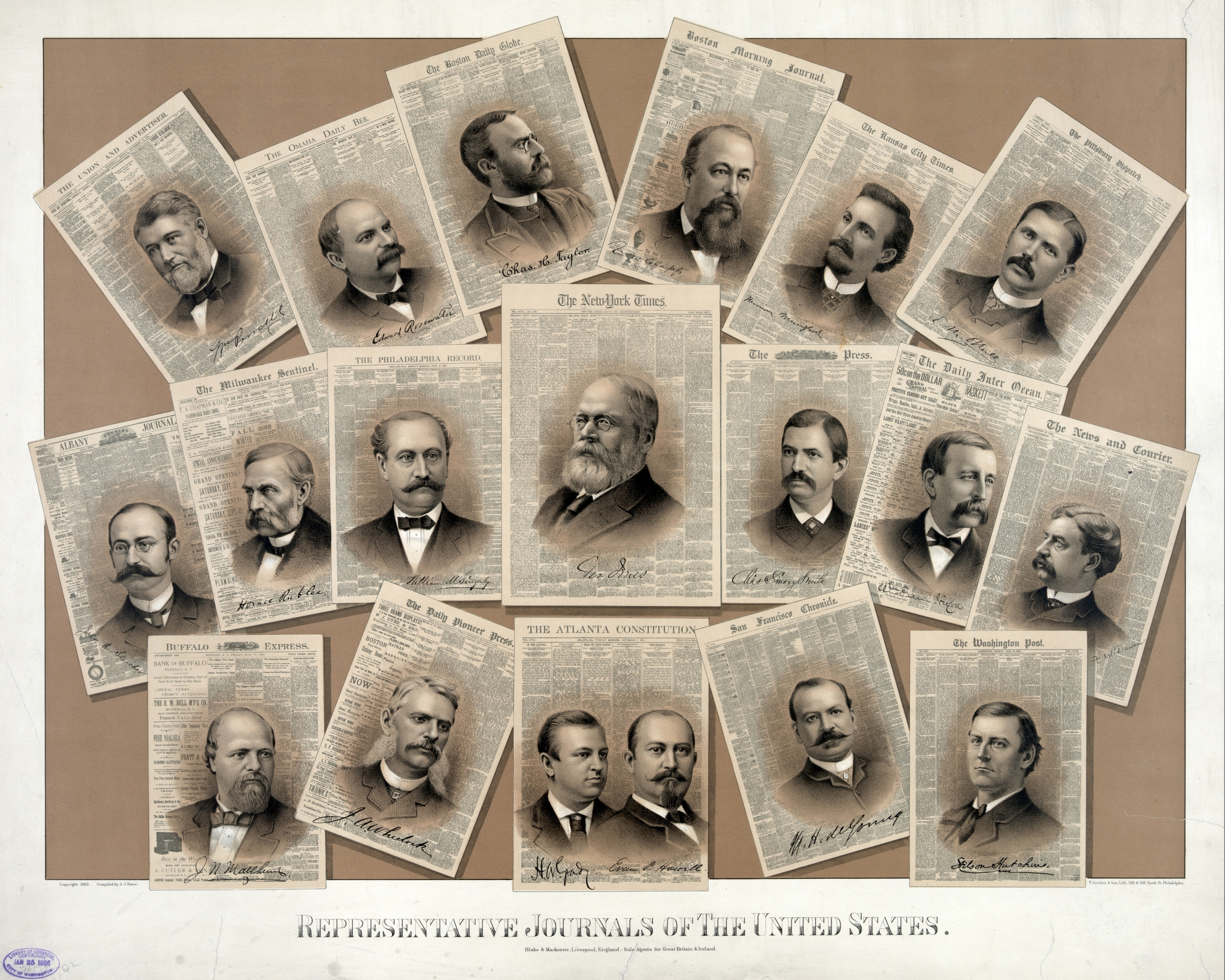
A selection of American newspapers from 1885, with portraits of their publishers: Top row: The Union and Advertiser (William Purcell) - The Omaha Daily Bee (Edward Rosewater) - The Boston Daily Globe (Charles H. Taylor) - Boston Morning Journal (William Warland Clapp) - The Kansas City Times (Morrison Mumford) - The Pittsburgh Dispatch (M. O'Neill). Middle row: Albany Evening Journal (John A. Sleicher) - The Milwaukee Sentinel (Horace Rublee) - The Philadelphia Record (William M. Singerly) - The New York Times (George Jones) - The Philadelphia Press (Charles Emory Smith) - The Daily Inter Ocean (William Penn Nixon) - The News and Courier (Francis Warrington Dawson). 'Bottom row: Buffalo Express (James Newson Matthews) - The Daily Pioneer Press (Joseph A. Wheelock) - The Atlanta Constitution (Henry W. Grady & Evan Howell) - San Francisco Chronicle (Michael H. de Young) - The Washington Post (Stilson Hutchins)

The history of American newspapers begins in the 17th century with the publication of the first colonial newspapers. American newspapers began as a sideline for printers. They became a political force in the campaign for American independence. Following independence, the first amendment to the U.S. Constitution guaranteed freedom of the press. The Postal Service Act of 1792 provided substantial subsidies: Newspapers were delivered up to 100 miles for a penny and beyond for 1.5 cents, when first class postage ranged from six cents to a quarter.

The American press grew rapidly during the First Party System (1790s–1810s) when both parties sponsored papers to reach their loyal partisans. From the 1830s onward, the Penny press began to play a major role in American journalism. Technological advancements such as the telegraph and faster printing presses in the 1840s also helped expand the nation's press as it experienced rapid economic and demographic growth. Editors typically became the local party spokesman, and hard-hitting editorials were widely reprinted.

By 1900, major newspapers had become profitable powerhouses of advocacy, muckraking, and sensationalism, alongside serious and objective news-gathering. During the early 20th century, prior to the rise of television, the average American read several newspapers per day. Starting in the 1920s, technological changes reshaped American journalism as radio and later television began to play increasingly important competitive roles.

In the late 20th century, much of American journalism became housed in big media chains. With the coming of digital journalism in the 21st century, all newspapers faced a business crisis as readers turned to the Internet for sources and advertisers followed them.

== Colonial period ==
On September 25, 1690, the first colonial newspaper in America, Publick Occurrences Both Forreign and Domestick, was published in Boston. However, it was suppressed after its first edition.

In 1704, the governor allowed The Boston News-Letter, a weekly, to be published, and it became the first continuously published newspaper in the colonies. Philadelphia had two newspapers by 1760.

Merchants published mainly commercial papers. For example, The Boston Daily Advertiser reported on ship arrivals and departures.

By the mid-1760s, there were 24 weekly newspapers in the 13 colonies (only New Jersey lacked one), and satirical attacks on government became common in American newspapers.

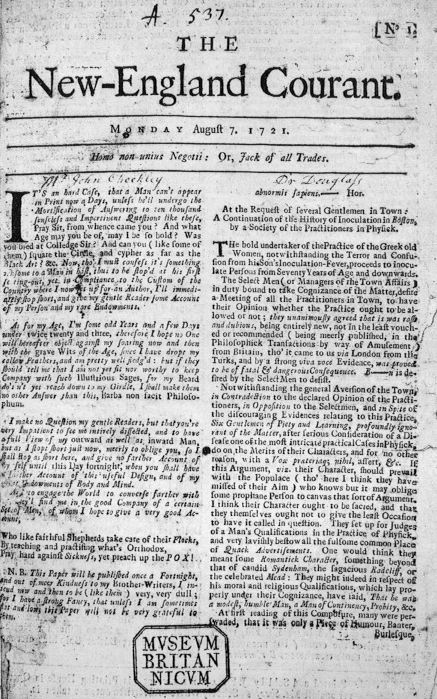
The New England Courant, the 7 August 1721 front page

James Franklin (1697–1735), Benjamin Franklin's older brother, launched a third newspaper, The New England Courant." His associates were known as the Hell-Fire Club; they succeeded in publishing a distinctive newspaper that annoyed the New England elite, while proving entertaining and establishing a kind of literary precedent. Instead of filling the first part of the Courant with governors' addresses to provincial legislatures, James Franklin's club wrote essays and satirical letters modeled on The Spectator, which had appeared in London ten years earlier. After the more formal news reporting on some general topic, the facetious letters of imaginary correspondents commonly filled the remainder of the Courant's first page. Spectator texts were sometimes reprinted in the Courant in their entirety, and the paper also included poetry, histories, autobiographies, etc.

Benjamin Franklin saw the printing press as a device to instruct colonial Americans in moral virtue. Frasca argues that he saw this as a service to God because he understood moral virtue in terms of actions; thus, doing good provided a service to God. Despite his own moral lapses, Franklin saw himself as uniquely qualified to instruct Americans in morality. He tried to influence American moral life through the construction of a printing network based on a chain of partnerships from the Carolinas to New England. Franklin thereby invented the first newspaper chain. It was more than a business venture, for like many publishers since, he believed that the press had a public-service duty.

When Franklin established himself in Philadelphia in 1729 the town boasted three newspapers: Andrew Bradford's American Mercury, and Samuel Keimer's Universal Instructor in all Arts and Sciences and Pennsylvania Gazette. This instruction in all arts and sciences consisted of weekly extracts from Chambers's Universal Dictionary. Franklin purchased the Instructor and renamed it The Pennsylvania Gazette, its first issue coming out on October 2, 1729.

The Pennsylvania Gazette, like most other newspapers of the period, was often poorly printed. Franklin was busy with a hundred matters outside of his printing office, and never seriously attempted to raise the mechanical standards of his trade. Nor did he ever properly edit or collate the chance medley of stale items that passed for news in the Gazette. His influence on the practical side of journalism was minimal. On the other hand, his advertisements for books show his strong interest in popularizing secular literature. Undoubtedly, his paper contributed to the broader culture that distinguished Pennsylvania from its neighbors before the Revolution. Like many publishers, Franklin built a bookshop in his printing office; he took the opportunity to read new books before selling them.

Franklin had mixed success in his plan to establish an inter-colonial network of newspapers that would produce a profit for him and disseminate virtue. He began in Charleston, South Carolina, in 1731. After the second editor died, his widow, Elizabeth Timothy, took over and made it a success, 1738–1746. She was one of the colonial era's first woman printers. For three decades, Franklin maintained a close business relationship with her and her son, Peter, who took over in 1746. The Gazette had a policy of impartiality in political debates while creating opportunities for public debate, which encouraged others to challenge authority. Editor Peter Timothy avoided blandness and crude bias and, after 1765, increasingly took a patriotic stand in the growing crisis with Great Britain.

However, Franklin's Connecticut Gazette (1755–1768) proved unsuccessful.

=== The Virginia Gazette ===
Early theatrical notices may also be followed in The Virginia Gazette, edited by William Parks in Williamsburg, the old capital of Virginia. Performances of The Busy-Body, The Recruiting Officer, and The Beaux' Stratagem were often by amateurs, though professionals were known as early as 1716 in Williamsburg. Life in Williamsburg in 1736 had a more cosmopolitan quality than in other towns. An essay-serial called The Monitor, which fills the first page of The Virginia Gazette for twenty-two numbers, probably reflects not only the social life of the capital, but also the newer fashion in such periodical work. It is dramatic in method, with vividly realized characters who gossip and chat over games of piquet or at the theatre. The Beaux' Stratagem, which had been played in Williamsburg three weeks before, is mentioned as delightful enough to make one of the ladies commit the indiscretion of giggling. The Monitor represents a kind of light social satire unusual in the colonies.

=== Politics in the later newspapers ===
After 1750, general news became accessible, and newspapers increasingly showed interest in public affairs. The literary first page was no longer necessary, though occasionally used to cover a dull period. A new type of polemic gradually superseded the older essay. A few of the well-known conventions were retained, however, such as the fictitious letter with the fanciful signature, or a series of papers under a common title, such as The Virginia-Centinel, or Livingston's Watch-Tower. The former is an appeal to arms, running through The Virginia Gazette in 1756, and copied into Northern papers to rouse patriotism against the French enemy. The expression of the sentiment, even thus early, seems national. Livingston's well-known Watch-Tower, a continuation of his pamphlet-magazine The Independent Reflector, presaged Revolutionary writings of fifteen and twenty years later. The fifty-second number includes one of the popular phrases of the Revolution: "Had I not sounded the Alarm, Bigotry would e'er now have triumphed over the natural Rights of British Subjects." (Gaine's Mercury in 1754–1755)

== Revolutionary epoch and early national era: 1770–1820 ==
(This section is based on Newspapers, 1775–1860 by Frank W. Scott)

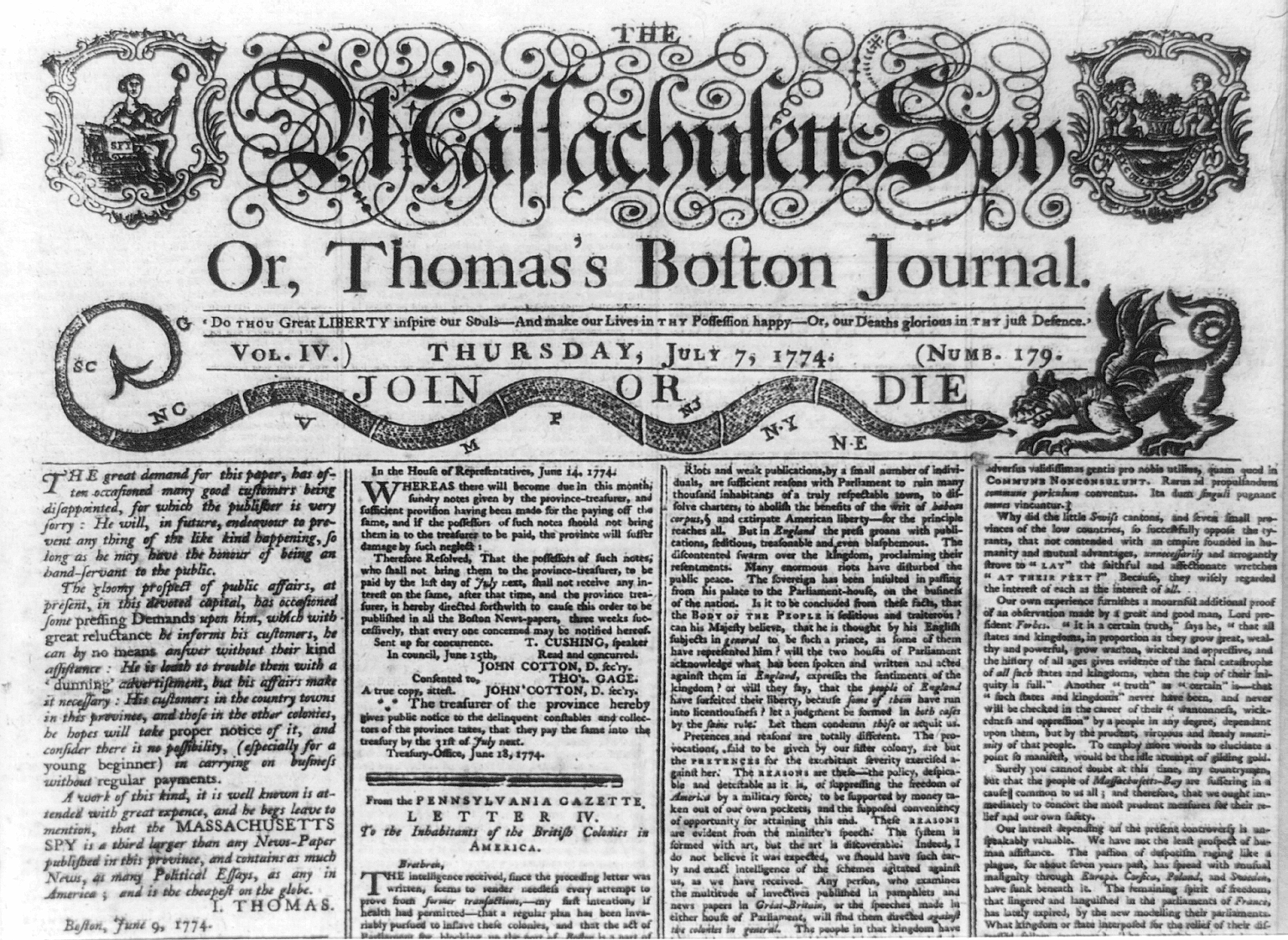
Massachusetts Spy, July 7, 1774

Weekly newspapers in major cities and towns were strongholds of patriotism (though a few were Loyalist papers). They printed many pamphlets, announcements, patriotic letters, and pronouncements. On the eve of the Revolution, Virginia had three separate weeklies named The Virginia Gazette—they all kept up a heavy fire against the king and his governors.

=== The Massachusetts Spy and the Patriotic Press ===
Isaiah Thomas's Massachusetts Spy, published in Boston and Worcester, was constantly on the verge of being suppressed from the time of its establishment in 1770 to 1776. In 1771-73, the Spy featured the essays of several anonymous political commentators who called themselves "Centinel," "Mucius Scaevola," and "Leonidas." These writers spoke to the colonists as an independent people tied to Britain only by a voluntary legal compact. Articles from the Spy were reprinted in other papers in the colonies.

The turbulent years between 1775 and 1783 were a time of great trial and disturbance among newspapers. Interruptions, suppression, and lack of support significantly hindered their growth. Although there were forty-three newspapers in the United States when the treaty of peace was signed (1783), as compared with thirty-seven on the date of the Battle of Lexington (1775), only a dozen remained in continuous operation between the two events, and most of those had experienced delays and difficulties through lack of paper, type, and patronage. Not one newspaper in the principal cities, Boston, New York, and Philadelphia, continued publication throughout the war. When the colonial forces were in possession of the territory, royalist papers were suppressed; during British occupation, revolutionary papers moved away, were discontinued, or became royalist. There was an exodus of papers from the cities along the coast to smaller inland places, where they could continue without interruption. There was an acute scarcity of paper and publishers could not replace worn type. This meant that the appearance of the newspapers deteriorated, and issues sometimes failed to appear. Mail service was poor, and foreign newspapers, an important source of information, could be obtained but rarely.

News from distant sources was less complete and regular than it had been before revolutionary times. Reports of major events were however disseminated through messengers who were in the service of patriotic organizations. The Salem Gazette printed an account of the battle of Lexington, detailing the burning, pillage, and barbarities charged to the British, and praising the militia, who were filled with "higher sentiments of humanity." When the Declaration of Independence was published by Congress on July 6, 1776, it initially appeared in the Philadelphia Evening Post from which it was copied by most of the newspapers in the new nation. Some papers managed to print detailed accounts of the proceedings of provincial assemblies and of Congress; others, but in general readers were given a limited account of the progress of the war.

The spirit of the time was expressed in mottoes, editorials, letters, and poems. Over time both editorials and other writings urged united resistance, discussing independence and theories of government. The papers published poems inspired by current events, narratives of battles, and eulogies of departed heroes. Much of the poetry of the Revolution is to be found in the columns of the newspapers, from the vivid and popular satires and narratives of Philip Freneau to the saddest effusions of the most commonplace schoolmaster.

The newspapers of the Revolution worked towards the unification of sentiment, the awakening of a consciousness of a common purpose, interest, and destiny among the separate colonies, and of a determination to see the war through to a successful issue. They were more single-minded than the people themselves, and they bore no small share of the burden of arousing and supporting the often discouraged and indifferent public spirit. The New Jersey Journal became the second newspaper published in New Jersey. It was established by Shepard Kollock at his press in 1779 in the village of Chatham, New Jersey. This paper became a catalyst in the revolution. News of events came directly to the editor from Washington's headquarters in nearby Morristown, boosting the morale of the troops and their families, and he conducted lively debates about the efforts for independence with those who opposed and supported the cause he championed. Kollock later relocated the paper twice, until 1785, when he established his last publication location in Elizabeth under the same name. The Elizabeth Daily Journal ceased publication on January 2, 1992, after 212 years of continuous publication, making it the fourth-oldest newspaper published continuously in the United States.

Many of the papers, however, which were kept alive or brought to life during the war, could not adapt themselves to the new conditions of peace. Perhaps only a dozen of the survivors held their own in the new time, notably the Boston Gazette, which declined rapidly in the following decade, The Connecticut Courant of Hartford, The Providence Gazette, and The Pennsylvania Packet of Philadelphia, to which may be added such representative papers as the Massachusetts Spy, Boston's Independent Chronicle, the New York Journal and Packet, the Newport Mercury, the Maryland Gazette of Annapolis, The Pennsylvania Gazette and The Pennsylvania Journal, both of Philadelphia. Practically all were of four small pages, each of three or four columns, issued weekly. In 1783, the Pennsylvania Evening Post became the first American daily. The next year, the Pennsylvania Packet was published three times a week, and the New York Journal twice a week, as were several of the papers begun in that year. There was a notable extension to new fields. In Vermont, where the first paper, established in 1781, had soon died, another arose in 1783; in Maine, two were started in 1785. In 1786, the first one west of the Alleghenies appeared in Pittsburgh, and following the westward tide of immigration, the Kentucky Gazette was begun at Lexington in 1787.

Conditions were hardly more favorable to newspapers than during the recent conflict. The sources of news were much the same; the means of communication and the postal system were little improved. Newspapers were not carried in the mails but by favor of the postmen, and the money of one state was of dubious value in another. Consequently, circulations were small, rarely reaching a thousand; subscribers were slow in paying; and advertisements were not plentiful. Newspapers remained subject to provincial laws of libel, in accordance with the old common law, and were, as in Massachusetts for a short time in 1785, subject to special state taxes on paper or on advertisements. But public sentiment was growing strongly against all legal restrictions, and in general, the papers practiced freedom, not to say license, of utterance.

With independence had come the consciousness of a great destiny. The collective spirit aroused by the war, though clouded by conflicting local difficulties, was intense, and the principal interest of the newspapers was to create a nation out of the loose confederation. Business and commerce were their next care, but in an effort to be all things to all men, the small page included a little of whatever might "interest, instruct, or amuse." Political intelligence occupied first place; news, in the modern sense, was subordinated. A new idea, quite as much as a fire, a murder, or a prodigy, was a matter of news moment. There were always a few items of local interest, usually placed with paragraphs of editorial miscellany. Correspondents, in return for the paper, sent items; private letters, often no doubt written with a view to such use, were a fruitful source of news, but the chief resource was the newspapers that every office received as exchanges, carried in the post free of charge, and the newspapers from abroad.

=== Partisan newspapers ===
Newspapers became a form of public property after 1800. Americans believed that, as republican citizens, they had a right to access the newspaper's information without paying. To gain access, readers subverted the subscription system by refusing to pay, borrowing, or stealing. Editors, however, tolerated these tactics because they wanted longer subscription lists. First, the more people read the newspaper, the more attractive it would be to advertisers, who would purchase more ads and pay higher rates. A second advantage was that greater depth of coverage translated into political influence for partisan newspapers. Newspapers also became part of the public sphere when they became freely available at reading rooms, barbershops, taverns, hotels, and coffeehouses.

The editor, usually reflecting the sentiment of a group or a faction, began to emerge as a distinct power. He closely followed the drift of events and expressed vigorous opinions. But as yet the principal discussions were contributed not by the editors but by "the master minds of the country." The growing importance of the newspaper was shown in the discussions preceding the Federal Convention, and notably in the countrywide debate over the adoption of the Constitution, in which the newspaper largely displaced the pamphlet. When Alexander Hamilton, James Madison, and John Jay united to produce the Federalist Essays, they chose to publish them in The Independent Journal and The Daily Advertiser, from which they were copied by practically every paper in America long before they were made into a book.

When the first Congress assembled on March 4, 1789, the administration felt the need for a paper, and, under the influence of Hamilton, John Fenno issued at New York, April 15, the first number of The Gazette of the United States, the earliest of a series of administration organs. The editorship of the Gazette later fell to Joseph Dennie, who had previously made a success of The Farmer's Weekly Museum and would later found The Port Folio, two of the most successful newspapers of the era. The seat of government became the journalistic center of the country, and as long as party politics remained the staple news interest, the administration organs and their opponents were the chief sources of news for the country's papers.

Partisan bitterness increased during the last decade of the century as the First Party System took shape. The parties needed newspapers to communicate with their voters. New England papers were generally Federalist; in Pennsylvania, there was a balance; in the West and South, the Republican press predominated. Though the Federalists were vigorously supported by such able papers as Russell's Columbian Centinel in Boston, Isaiah Thomas's Massachusetts Spy, The Connecticut Courant, and, after 1793, Noah Webster's daily Minerva (soon renamed Commercial Advertiser) in New York, the Gazette of the United States, which in 1790 followed Congress and the capital to Philadelphia, was at the center of conflict, "a paper of pure Toryism", as Thomas Jefferson said, "disseminating the doctrines of monarchy, aristocracy, and the exclusion of the people." To offset the influence of this, Jefferson and Madison induced Philip Freneau, who had been editing The Daily Advertiser in New York, to set up a "half weekly", to "go through the states and furnish a Whig [Republican] vehicle of intelligence." Freneau's National Gazette, which first appeared on October 31, 1791, soon became the most outspoken critic of the administration of Adams, Hamilton, and Washington, and an ardent advocate of the French Revolution. Fenno and Freneau, in the Gazette of the United States and the National Gazette, at once came to grips, and the campaign of personal and party abuse in partisan news reports, in virulent editorials, in poems and skits of every kind, was echoed from one end of the country to the other. The National Gazette closed in 1793 due to circulation problems and the political backlash against Jefferson and Madison's financial involvement in founding the paper.

The other Republican paper of primary importance was the Aurora General Advertiser, founded on October 2, 1790, by Ben Franklin's grandson and heir, Benjamin Franklin Bache. The Aurora, published from Franklin Court in Philadelphia, was the most strident newspaper of its time, attacking John Adams' anti-democratic policies on a daily basis. No paper is thought to have given Adams more trouble than the Aurora. His wife, Abigail, wrote frequent letters to her sister and others, decrying what she considered the slander spewing forth from the Aurora. Jefferson credited the Aurora with averting a disastrous war with France and laying the groundwork for his own election. Following Bache's death (the result of his staying in Philadelphia during a yellow fever epidemic, while he was awaiting trial under the Sedition Act), William Duane, an immigrant from Ireland, led the paper until 1822 (and married Bache's widow, following the death of his own wife in the same Yellow Fever epidemic). Like Freneau, Bache and Duane were involved in a daily back-and-forth with the Federalist editors, especially Fenno and Cobbett.

Noah Webster, strapped for money, accepted an offer in late 1793 from Alexander Hamilton of $1,500 to move to New York City and edit a Federalist newspaper. In December, he founded New York's first daily newspaper, American Minerva (later known as The Commercial Advertiser). He edited it for four years, writing the equivalent of 20 volumes of articles and editorials. He also published the semi-weekly publication, The Herald, A Gazette for the country (later known as The New York Spectator). As a partisan he soon was denounced by the Jeffersonian Republicans as "a pusillanimous, half-begotten, self-dubbed patriot", "an incurable lunatic", and "a deceitful newsmonge ... Pedagogue and Quack." Fellow Federalist Cobbett labeled him "a traitor to the cause of Federalism", calling him "a toad in the service of sans-culottism", "a prostitute wretch", "a great fool, and a barefaced liar", "a spiteful viper", and "a maniacal pedant." The master of words was distressed. Even the use of words like "the people", "democracy", and "equality" in public debate bothered him, for such words were "metaphysical abstractions that either have no meaning, or at least none that mere mortals can comprehend."

The first party newspapers were full of vituperation. As one historian comments,

It was, however, with the newspaper editors on both sides that a climax of rancorous and venomous abuse was reached. Of the Federalist editors, the most voluminous masters of scurrility were William Cobbett of Porcupine's Gazette and John Ward Fenno of the United States Gazette, at Philadelphia; Noah Webster of the American Minerva, at New York; and at Boston, Benjamin Russell of the Columbian Centinel, Thomas Paine of the Federal Orrery, and John Russell of the Boston Gazette. Chief of these was Cobbett, whose control of abusive epithet and invective may be judged from the following terms applied by him to his political foes, the Jacobins: "refuse of nations"; "yelper of the Democratic kennels"; "vile old wretch"; "tool of a baboon"; "frog-eating, man-eating, blood-drinking cannibals"; "I say, beware, ye under-strapping cut-throats who walk in rags and sleep amidst filth and vermin; for if once the halter gets round your flea-bitten necks, howling and confessing will come too late." He wrote of the "base and hellish calumnies" propagated by the Jacobins, and of "tearing the mask from the artful and ferocious villains who, owing to the infatuation of the poor, and the supineness of the rich, have made such fearful progress in the destruction of all that is amiable and good and sacred among men." Among the milder examples of his description of Jacobins was the following:

"Where the voice of the people has the most weight in public affairs, there it is most easy to introduce novel and subversive doctrines. In such States too, there generally, not to say always, exists a party who, from the long habit of hating those who administer the Government, become the enemies of the Government itself, and are ready to sell their treacherous services to the first bidder. To these descriptions of men, the sect of the Jacobins have attached themselves in every country they have been suffered to enter. They are a sort of flies that naturally settle on the excremental and corrupted parts of the body politic... The persons who composed this opposition, and who thence took the name of Anti-Federalists, were not equal to the Federalists, either in point of riches or respectability. They were, in general, men of bad moral characters, embarrassed in their private affairs, or the tools of such as were. Men of this caste naturally feared the operation of a Government imbued with sufficient strength to make itself respected, and with sufficient wisdom to exclude the ignorant and wicked from a share in its administration."

This decade of violence was nevertheless one of development in both the quality and the power of newspapers. News reporting was extended to new fields of local affairs, and the intense rivalry of all too numerous competitors awoke the beginnings of that rush for the earliest reports, which was to become the dominant trait in American journalism. The editor evolved into a new type. As a man of literary skill, or a politician, or a lawyer with a gift for polemical writing, he began to supersede the contributors of essays as the strongest writer on the paper. Much of the best writing, and of the rankest scurrility, be it said, was produced by editors born and trained abroad, like Bache of the Aurora, Cobbett, Cooper, Gales, Cheetham, Callender, Lyon, and Holt. Of the whole number of papers in the country towards the end of the decade, more than one hundred and fifty, at least twenty opposed to the administration were conducted by aliens. The power wielded by these anti-administration editors impressed John Adams, who in 1801 wrote: "If we had been blessed with common sense, we should not have been overthrown by Philip Freneau, Duane, Callender, Cooper, and Lyon, or their great patron and protector. A group of foreign liars, encouraged by a few ambitious native gentlemen, have discomfited the education, the talents, the virtues, and the prosperity of the country."

The most obvious example of that Federalist lack of common sense was the passage of the Alien and Sedition laws in 1798 to protect the government from the libels of editors. The result was a dozen convictions and a storm of outraged public opinion that threw the party from power and gave the Jeffersonian Republican press renewed confidence and the material benefit of patronage when the Republicans took control of the government in 1800. The Republican party was especially effective in building a network of newspapers in major cities to broadcast its statements and editorialize in its favor. Fisher Ames, a leading Federalist, blamed the newspapers for electing Jefferson: they were "an overmatch for any Government... The Jacobins owe their triumph to the unceasing use of this engine; not so much to skill in use of it as by repetition."

The newspapers continued to be primarily party organs; the tone remained strongly partisan, though it gradually gained poise and attained a degree of literary excellence and professional dignity. The typical weekly newspaper, had a paid circulation of 500. The growth of the postal system, with free local and statewide transportation of newspapers, allowed the emergence of powerful state newspapers that closely reflected and shaped party views.

=== Growth ===
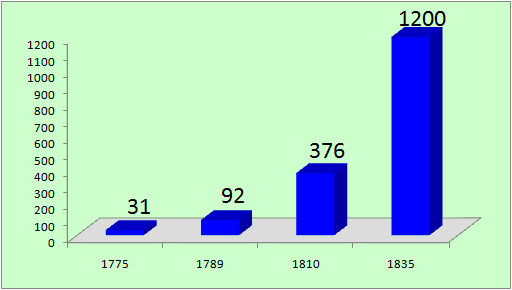
Growth in newspapers

The number and geographical distribution of newspapers grew apace. In 1800, there were between 150 and 200; by 1810, there were 366, and during the next two decades the increase was at least as rapid. With astonishing promptness, the press followed the sparse population as it trickled westward and down the Ohio or penetrated the more northerly forests. By 1835, papers had spread to the Mississippi River and beyond, from Texas to St. Louis, throughout Ohio, Indiana, Illinois, Michigan, and into Wisconsin. These pioneer papers, poorly written, poorly printed, and partisan, often beyond all reason, served a greater purpose than merely local in sending weekly to every locality their hundreds of messages of good and evil report, of politics and trade, of weather and crops, that helped immeasurably to bind the far-flung population into a nation. Every congressman wrote regularly to his own local paper; other correspondents were called upon for like service, and in some instances the country editors established extensive and reliable lines of intelligence; but most of them depended on the bundle of exchanges from Washington, Philadelphia, and New York, and reciprocally the city papers made good use of their country exchanges.

As the number of cities with populations of 8,000 or more grew rapidly, so too did the number of daily newspapers. The first had appeared in Philadelphia and New York in 1784 and 1785; in 1796, one appeared in Boston. By 1810, there were twenty-seven in the country—one in the city of Washington, five in Maryland, seven in New York, nine in Pennsylvania, three in South Carolina, and two in Louisiana. As early as 1835, the Detroit Free Press began its long career.

== The press in the Party System: 1820–1890 ==
(This section is based on Newspapers, 1775–1860 by Frank W. Scott)

The political and journalistic situation made the administration organ one of the period's characteristic features. Fenno's Gazette had served the purpose for Washington and Adams; but the first great example of the type was the National Intelligencer established in October 1800, by Samuel Harrison Smith, to support the administration of Jefferson and of successive presidents until after Jackson it was thrown into the opposition, and The United States Telegraph, edited by Duff Green, became the official paper. It was replaced at the close of 1830 by a new paper, The Globe, under the editorship of Francis P. Blair, one of the ablest of all ante-bellum political editors, who, with John P. Rives, conducted it until the changing standards and conditions in journalism rendered the administration organ obsolescent. The Globe was displaced in 1841 by another paper called The National Intelligencer, which in turn gave way to The Madisonian. Thomas Ritchie was, in 1845, called from his long service on The Richmond Enquirer to found, on the remains of The Globe, the Washington Union, to speak for the Polk administration and to reconcile the factions of democracy. Neither the Union nor its successors, which maintained the semblance of official support until 1860, ever occupied the commanding position held by the Telegraph and The Globe, but for forty years the administration organs had been the leaders when political journalism was dominant. Their influence was shared and increased by such political editors as M. M. Noah and James Watson Webb of the New York Courier and Enquirer, Solomon Southwick of the Albany Register, Edwin Croswell, who edited The Argus and who, supported by Martin Van Buren and others, formed what was known as the "Albany Regency." The "Regency", the Richmond "Junta", which centered in the Enquirer, and the "Kitchen Cabinet" headed by the editor of The Globe, formed one of the most powerful political and journalistic cabals that the country has ever known. Their decline, in the late thirties, coincided with great changes, both political and journalistic, and though successors arose, their kind was not again so prominent or influential. The newspaper of national scope was passing away, yielding to the influence of the telegraph and the railroad, which robbed the Washington press of its claim to prestige as the chief source of political news. At the same time, politics was losing its predominant importance. The public had many other interests, and a new spirit and type of journalism was being trained to make greater and more various demands upon the journalistic resources of its papers.

The administration organ presents, but one aspect of a tendency in which political newspapers generally gained in editorial individuality, and both the papers and their editors acquired greater personal and editorial influence. The beginnings of the era of personal journalism were to be found early in the 19th century. Even before Nathan Hale had shown the way to editorial responsibility, Thomas Ritchie, in the Richmond Enquirer in the second decade of the century, had combined with an effective development of the established use of anonymous letters on current questions a system of editorial discussion that soon extended his reputation and the influence of his newspaper far beyond the boundaries of Virginia. Washington Barrow and the Nashville Banner, Amos Kendall and The Argus of Western America, G. W. Kendall and the New Orleans Picayune, John M. Francis and the Troy Times, and Charles Hammond and the Cincinnati Gazette, to mention but a few among many, illustrate the rise of editors to individual power and prominence in the third and later decades. Notable among these political editors was John Moncure Daniel, who just before 1850 became editor of the Richmond Examiner and soon made it the leading newspaper of the South. Perhaps no better example need be sought of brilliant invective and literary pungency in American journalism just prior to and during the Civil War than in Daniel's contributions to the Examiner.

Though it could still be said that "too many of our gazettes are in the hands of persons destitute at once of the urbanity of gentlemen, the information of scholars, and the principles of virtue", a fact due largely to the intensity of party spirit, the profession was by no means without editors who exhibited all these qualities, and put them into American journalism. Alexander Hamilton founded the New York Evening Post (the present-day New York Post) in 1801, with well-regarded William Coleman as editor.

Indeed, the problem most seriously discussed at the earliest state meetings of editors and publishers, held in the thirties, was improving the press's tone. They tried, by joint resolution, to attain a degree of editorial self-restraint, which few individual editors had yet acquired. Under the influence of Thomas Ritchie, vigorous and unsparing political editor but always a gentleman, who presided at the first meeting of Virginia journalists, the newspaper men in one state after another resolved to "abandon the infamous practice of pampering the vilest of appetites by violating the sanctity of private life, and indulging in gross personalities and indecorous language", and to "conduct all controversies between themselves with decency, decorum, and moderation." Ritchie found in the low tone of the newspapers a reason why journalism in America did not occupy as high a place in public regard as it did in England and France.

=== Editorials ===
The editorial page was assuming something of its modern form. The editorial signed with a pseudonym gradually died out, but unsigned editorial comments and leading articles did not become an established feature until after 1814, when Nathan Hale made them a characteristic of the newly established Boston Daily Advertiser. From that time on, they grew in importance until, in the succeeding period of personal journalism, they were the most vital part of the greater papers.

=== Innovations in news reporting ===
The Sun, a newspaper in New York City, was the first to hire reporters to go out and collect stories. Prior to this, newspapers dealt almost exclusively in articles about politics or reviews of books or the theater and relied, in the days before the organization of syndicates such as the Associated Press (AP) and United Press International (UPI), on items sent in by readers and unauthorized copies of stories from other newspapers. The Sun's focus on crime was the beginning of "the craft of reporting and storytelling". The paper had a central focus on crime news, in which it was a pioneer, and was the first journal to hire a police reporter. Its audience was primarily working class readers.

=== Penny press ===
In 1830 the United States had 650 weekly newspapers and 65 daily ones. This grew to 1,141 weeklies and 138 dailies by 1840. In the 1830s new high speed presses allowed the cheap printing of tens of thousands of papers a day. Selling them to their intended audience required new business techniques (such as rapid citywide delivery) and a new style of journalism to attract new audiences.

James Gordon Bennett Sr. (1794–1872) took the lead in New York with the New York Herald. His idea for success rested on the success of the one-cent press established by the New York Sun in 1833. To pay at such a price, these papers must have large circulations, be sought among the public that had not been accustomed to buy papers, and gain by printing news of the street, shop, and factory. To reach this public, Bennett began the New York Herald. "In journalistic débuts of this kind", Bennett wrote, "many talk of principle—-political principle, party principle—-as a sort of steel trap to catch the public. We... disdain... all principle, as it is called, all party, all politics. Our only guide shall be good, sound, practical common sense, applicable to the business and bosoms of men engaged in everyday life."

According to historian Robert C Bannister, Bennett was :

A gifted and controversial editor. Bennett transformed the American newspaper. Expanding traditional coverage, the Harold provided sports reports, a society page, and advice to the lovelorn, soon permanent features of most metropolitan dailies. Bennett covered murders and sex scandals and delicious detail, faking materials when necessary.... His adroit use of telegraph, pony express, and even offshore ships to intercept European dispatches set high standards for rapid news gathering.

Bannister also argues that Bennett was a leading crusader against evils he perceived:

Combining opportunism and reform, Bennett exposed fraud on Wall Street, attacked the Bank of the United States, and generally joined the Jacksonian assault on privilege. Reflecting a growing nativism, he published excerpts from the anti-catholic disclosures of "Maria Monk" and greeted Know-Nothingism cordially. Defending labor unions in principle, he assailed much union activity. Unable to condemn slavery outright, he opposed abolitionism.

News was commodity, and the newspapers furnished it as a business transaction. The Herald, like the Sun, was successful and influential in altering journalistic practices. The penny press expanded its coverage to "personals": short paid-for paragraphs by men and women seeking companionship. These sometimes included short paragraphs of fiction, typically romantic. Moralists were aghast and warned of the ruin of young girls. Personals advertisements are still included in many papers and magazines into the 21st century.

=== Specialty media ===
In a period of widespread unrest and change, many specialized forms of journalism sprang up—religious, educational, agricultural, and commercial magazines proliferated. The Catholic immigrants started arriving in large numbers and major dioceses sponsored their own newspapers. For example, between 1845 and 1861, the Diocese of St. Louis saw four newspapers come and go: the Catholic News-Letter (1845–48), The Shepherd of the Valley (1850–54), The St. Louis Daily Leader (1855–56), and the Western Banner (1858–61). The Boston Pilot was the leading Irish Catholic paper whose news and editorials were often reprinted by other Catholic papers, the leading Irish Catholic newspaper of the period. The paper tried to balance support of the Union with its opposition to emancipation, while maintaining Irish American patriotism.

Evangelical Protestants began discussing temperance, prohibition, and even broached the subject of votes for women. Abolition of slavery after 1830 became a highly inflammatory topic promoted by evangelical Protestants in the North. The leading abolitionist newspaper was William Lloyd Garrison's Liberator, first issued January 1, 1831, which denounced slavery as a sin against God that had to be immediately stopped. Many abolitionist papers were excluded from the mails; their circulation was forcibly prevented in the South; in Boston, New York, Baltimore, Cincinnati, Alton, and elsewhere, editors were assaulted, offices were attacked and destroyed; rewards were offered in the South for the capture of Greeley and Garrison; in a few instances editors, like Lovejoy at Alton, lost their lives at the hands of mobs.

=== American Farmer ===
American Farmer was a weekly subscription-based agricultural newspaper founded by John Stuart Skinner in Baltimore, Maryland. Its first issue was published on April 2, 1819. American Farmer was one of the first and earliest American agricultural newspapers. Initially running from 1819 to 1834, it would occasionally return under alternative names until 1897. It received contributions and endorsements from important figures such as Thomas Jefferson, John Taylor, John Randolph, Timothy Pickering, Andrew Jackson, Edmund Ruffin, Thomas M. Randolph, John H. Cocke, and James Madison. The paper was dedicated to advancements in farming techniques and spreading agricultural knowledge. The paper attempted to avoid controversial political issues and remain distinct from other political newspapers of the time. The paper inspired the creation of several other agricultural newspapers in the United States and is considered a pioneer of agricultural journalism.

Over time, more of the paper began to be devoted to rural sports, and a dedicated sports segment was added in January of 1825. The addition of this section made it the first American newspaper to cover sporting events regularly. One sport of particular interest was horse racing. American Farmer contributed greatly to the popularization of the organized and intentional breeding of horses, along with detailed record keeping of horses’ pedigrees.

=== Rural papers ===
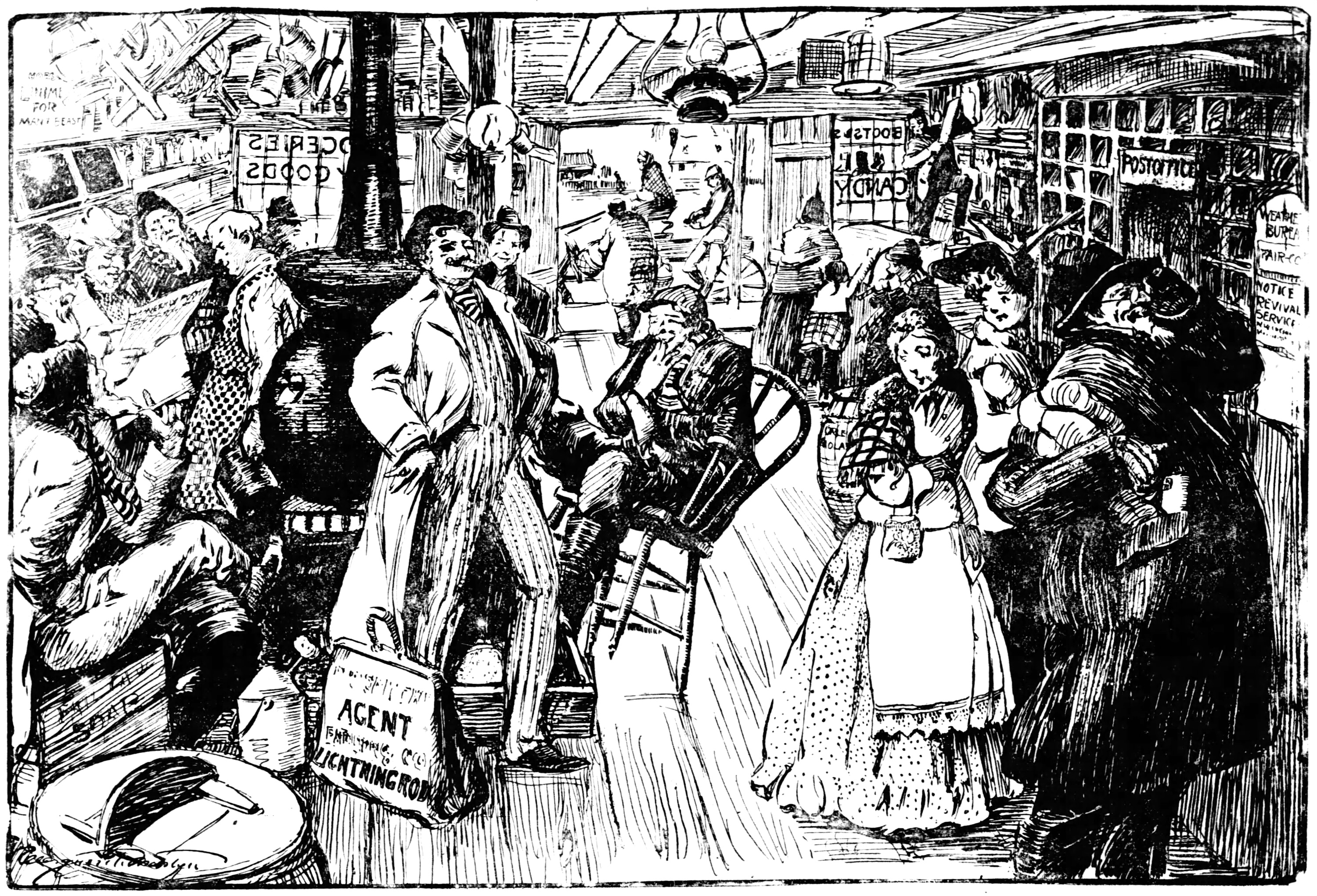
Fanciful drawing of a rural general store . On the far left, a group of men listen to a reading of the weekly newspaper.

Nearly every county seat, and most towns of more than 500 or 1000 population, sponsored one or more weekly newspapers. Politics was of chief interest. The editor-owner was typically deeply involved in local party organizations and shared updated information on new developments. The paper also contained local news and presented literary columns and book excerpts that catered to an emerging middle-class, literate audience. A typical rural newspaper provided its readers with a substantial source of national and international news and political commentary, typically reprinted from metropolitan newspapers. Higher income men paid for their subscriptions; others listened to a reading of the political news at a local store or tavern.

The major metropolitan daily newspapers gave regional or national circulation to weekly editions, with their contents often coed by rural papers. Most famously, the Weekly New York Tribune was jammed with political, economic, and cultural news and features, and was a major resource for the Whig and Republican parties, as well as a window on the international world and the New York and European cultural scenes. The expansion of the Rural Free Delivery program, which made daily newspapers more accessible in rural areas of the United States in the early twentieth century, increased support for populist parties and positions.

=== The press in western territories ===
The first newspaper to be published west of the Mississippi was the Missouri Gazette. Its starting issue was published on July 12, 1808, by Joseph Charless, an Irish printer. Swayed by Meriweather Lewis to leave his home in Kentucky and start a new paper for the Missouri Territory, the paper's masthead identified Charless as "Printer to the Territory". The paper published advertisements for domestic help, notices for runaway slaves, public notices, and sales of merchandise such as land plots or cattle. Newspapers like the Gazette were instrumental in the founding of new territories and in supporting their stability as they became states.

In 1849, The Santa Fe New Mexican began publication in Santa Fe, New Mexico Territory. It has gone on to be the longest-running newspaper west of the Mississippi river, and the longest running paper in the West and Southwestern United States. It continues to be one of the most widely distributed papers in the U.S. state of New Mexico, along with the Albuquerque Journal (1880) and Las Cruces Sun-News (1881).

With westward expansion, other territories, like Nebraska, followed Lewis and Missouri's plan for territorial stability and founded a newspaper alongside the opening of the Nebraska Territory in 1854. The Nebraska Palladium was a rough newspaper that published poetry and news from the East, ran advertisements, and created a space for emerging political editorials, helping develop a sense of community and cultural influence in the territory. Produced during a time when pioneers were far removed from neighbors, these early territorial papers brought a sense of community to the territories. Because of the information gap felt by new settlers in territories such as Kansas, Michigan, Nebraska, and Oklahoma, there was a mass startup of numerous newspapers. Frank Luther Mott says, "Wherever a town sprang up, there a printer with a rude press and a 'shirt-tail-full of type' was sure to appear". Competition was intense between the large number of pop-up papers, and often many failed within a year or were bought out by rivals.

=== Associated Press and impact of telegraphy ===
This idea of news and the newspaper for its own sake, the unprecedented aggressiveness in news-gathering, and the blatant methods by which the cheap papers were popularized aroused the antagonism of the older papers, but created a competition that could not be ignored. Systems of more rapid news-gathering (such as by "pony express") and distribution quickly appeared. Sporadic attempts at co-operation in obtaining news had already been made; in 1848, the Journal of Commerce, Courier and Enquirer, Tribune, Herald, Sun, and Express formed the New York Associated Press to jointly obtain news for its members. Out of this idea grew other local, then state, and finally national associations. European news, which, thanks to steamship service, could now be obtained when but half as old as before, became an important feature. In the forties, several papers sent correspondents abroad, and in the next decade, this field was highly developed.

The telegraph, invented in 1844, quickly linked all major cities and most minor ones to a national network that provided news in minutes or hours rather than days or weeks. It transformed the news gathering business. Telegraphic columns became a leading feature. The Associated Press (AP) became the dominant factor in the news distribution. The inland papers, in such cities as Chicago, Louisville, Cincinnati, St. Louis, and New Orleans, used AP dispatches to become independent of papers in Washington and New York. In general, only one newspaper in each city had the Associated Press franchise, and it dominated the market for national and international news. United Press was formed in the 1880s to challenge the monopoly. The growing number of chains led each to set up its own internal dissemination system.

=== Great editors ===
Out of the period of restless change in the 1830s, there emerged a few great editors whose force and ability gave them and their newspapers an influence hitherto unequalled, and made the period between 1840 and 1860 that of personal journalism. These few men not only interpreted and reflected the spirit of the time but also exerted great influence in shaping and directing public opinion. Consequently, the scope, character, and influence of newspapers were immensely widened and enriched, and rendered relatively free from the worst subjection to political control.

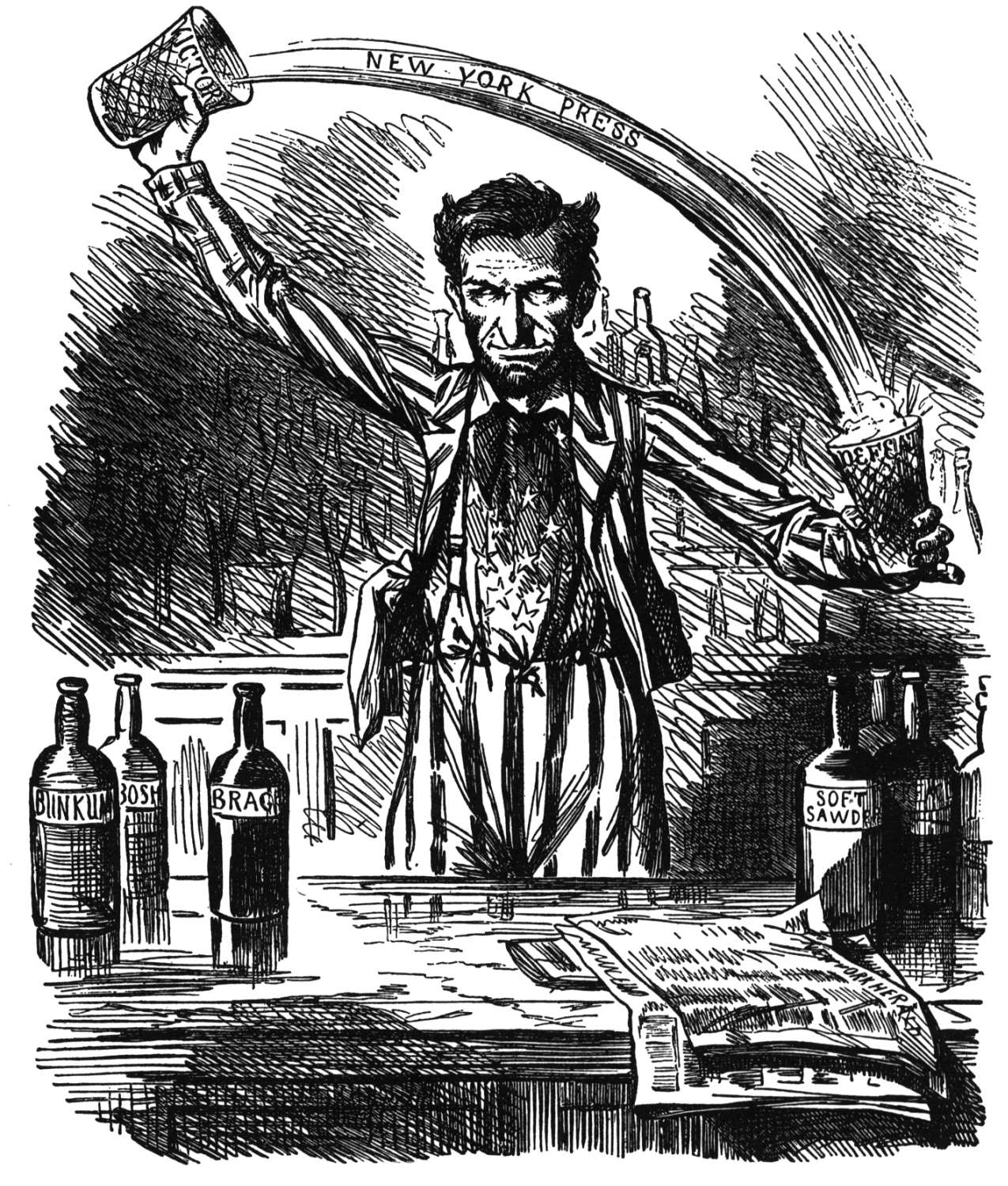
Lincoln spins the news—a Copperhead cartoon from 1862 (note the horns)

Naturally, the outstanding feature of this personal journalism was the editorial. Rescued from the slough of ponderousness into which it had fallen in its abject and uninspired party service, the editorial was revived, invigorated, and endowed with a vitality that made it the center about which all other features of the newspaper were grouped. It was individual; however large the staff of writers, the editorials were regarded as the utterance of the editor. "Greeley says" was the customary preface to quotations from the Tribune, and indeed, many editorials were signed. James Gordon Bennett, Sr., Samuel Bowles (1826–78), Horace Greeley (1811–72), and Henry J. Raymond (1820–69) were the outstanding figures of the period. Of Bennett's influence, something has already been said; especially, he freed his paper from party control. His power was great, but it came from his genius in gathering and presenting news rather than from editorial discussion, for he had no great moral, social, or political ideals, and his influence, always lawless and uncertain, can hardly be regarded as characteristic of the period. Of the others named, and many besides, it could be said with approximate truth that their ideal was "a full presentation and a liberal discussion of all questions of public concernment, from an entirely independent position, and a faithful and impartial exhibition of all movements of interest at home and abroad." As all three were not only upright and independent, but in various measures gifted with the quality of statesmanship at once philosophical and practical, their newspapers were powerful molders of opinion at a critical period in the history of the nation.

The news field was broadened; news style was changed. Interviews, newly introduced, lent ease and freshness of dialogue and direct quotation. There was improvement in the reporting of business, markets, and finance. In a few papers, the literary department was conducted by staff as able as any today. A foreign news service was developed that, in intelligence, fidelity, and general excellence, reached the highest standard yet attained in American journalism. A favorite feature was the series of letters from the editor or other members of the staff who traveled and wrote about what they heard or saw. Bowles, Olmsted, Greeley, Bayard Taylor, Bennett, and many others thus observed life and conditions at home or abroad; and they wrote so entertainingly and to such purpose that the letters—those of Olmsted and Taylor, for instance—are still sources of entertainment or information.

The early growth of these papers in 1840 through 1860 led to the development of large staffs of workers.

=== Greeley's New York Tribune ===
The New York Tribune under Horace Greeley exhibited features of the new and semi-independent personal journalism, based on political party supporters and inspired by an enthusiasm for service, one of the fine characteristics of the period. In editing the The New Yorker, Greeley had acquired experience in literary journalism and in political news; his Jeffersonian and Log Cabin were popular Whig campaign papers, which had brought him into contact with politicians and made his reputation as a journalist. He was a party man, therefore he was chosen to manage a party organ when one was needed to support the Whig administration of Harrison. The prospectus of the New York Tribune appeared on April 3, 1841. Almost from the first, the staff that made the Tribune represented a broad catholicity of interests and tastes, in the world of thought as well as in the world of action, and a solid excellence in ability and in organization. It included Henry J. Raymond, who later became Greeley's rival on the Times, George M. Snow, George William Curtis, Charles A. Dana, Bayard Taylor, George Ripley, William H. Fry, Margaret Fuller, Edmund Quincy, and Charles T. Congdon.

The great popular strength of the Tribune doubtless lay in its disinterested sympathy with all the ideals and sentiments that stirred the popular mind in the forties and fifties. "We cannot afford", Greeley wrote, "to reject unexamined any idea which proposes to improve the moral, intellectual, or social condition of mankind." He pointed out that the proper course of an editor, in contrast to that of the time-server, was to have "an ear open to the plaints of the wronged and suffering, though they can never repay advocacy, and those who mainly support newspapers will be annoyed and often exposed by it; a heart as sensitive to oppression and degradation in the next street as if they were practiced in Brazil or Japan; a pen as ready to expose and reprove the crimes whereby wealth is amassed and luxury enjoyed in our own country as if they had only been committed by Turks or Pagans in Asia some centuries ago."

On the most important question of the time, the abolition of slavery, Greeley's views were intimately connected with party policy. His antipathy to slavery, based on moral and economic grounds, placed him from the first among the mildly radical reformers. But his views underwent gradual intensification. Acknowledged the most influential Whig party editor in 1844, he had by 1850 become the most influential anti-slavery editor—the spokesman not of Whigs merely but of a great class of Northerners who were thoroughly antagonistic to slavery but who had not been satisfied with either the non-political war of Garrison or the one-plank political efforts of the Free Soil party. This influence was greatly increased between 1850 and 1854 by some of the most vigorous and trenchant editorial writing America has ever known. The circulation of the Tribune in 1850 was, all told, a little less than sixty thousand, two-thirds of which was the Weekly. In 1854, the Weekly alone had a circulation of 112,000 copies. But even this figure is not the measure of the Tribune's peculiar influence, "for it was pre-eminently the journal of the rural districts, and one copy did service for many readers. To the people in the Adirondack wilderness, it was a political bible, and the well-known scarcity of Democrats there was attributed to it. Yet it was as freely read by the intelligent people living on the Western Reserve of Ohio", (James Ford Rhodes) and in Wisconsin and Illinois. The work of Greeley and his associates in these years gave a new strength and a new scope and outlook to American journalism.

Greeley was a vigorous advocate of freedom of the press, especially in the 1830s and 1840s. He fought numerous libel lawsuits waged battles with the New York City postmaster, and shrugged off threats of duels and physical violence to his body. Greeley used his hard-hitting editorials to alert the public to dangers to press freedom. He would not tolerate any threats to freedom and democracy which curtailed the ability of the press to serve as a watchdog against corruption and a positive agency of social reform.

After replacing Greeley, Whitelaw Reid became the powerful long-time editor of the Tribune. He emphasized the importance of partisan newspapers in 1879:

The true statesman and the really influential editor are those who are able to control and guide parties... There is an old question as to whether a newspaper controls public opinion or public opinion controls the newspaper. This at least is true: that editor best succeeds who best interprets the prevailing and the better tendencies of public opinion, and, who, whatever his personal views concerning it, does not get himself too far out of relations to it. He will understand that a party is not an end, but a means; will use it if it lead to his end, -- will use some other if that serve better, but will never commit the folly of attempting to reach the end without the means... Of all the puerile follies that have masqueraded before High Heaven in the guise of Reform, the most childish has been the idea that the editor could vindicate his independence only by sitting on the fence and throwing stones with impartial vigor alike at friend and foe.

=== Henry Raymond and the New York Times ===
Henry Jarvis Raymond, who began his journalistic career on the Tribune and gained further experience in editing the respectable, old-fashioned, political Courier and Enquirer, perceived that there was an opening for a type of newspaper that should stand midway between Greeley, the moralist and reformer, and Bennett, the cynical, non-moral news-monger. He was able to interest friends in raising the hundred thousand dollars that he thought essential to the success of his enterprise. This sum is significant of the development of American daily journalism, for Greeley had started the Tribune only ten years earlier with a capital of one thousand dollars, and Bennett had founded the Herald with nothing at all. On this sound financial basis, Raymond began the career of The New York Times with his business partner George Jones on September 18, 1851.

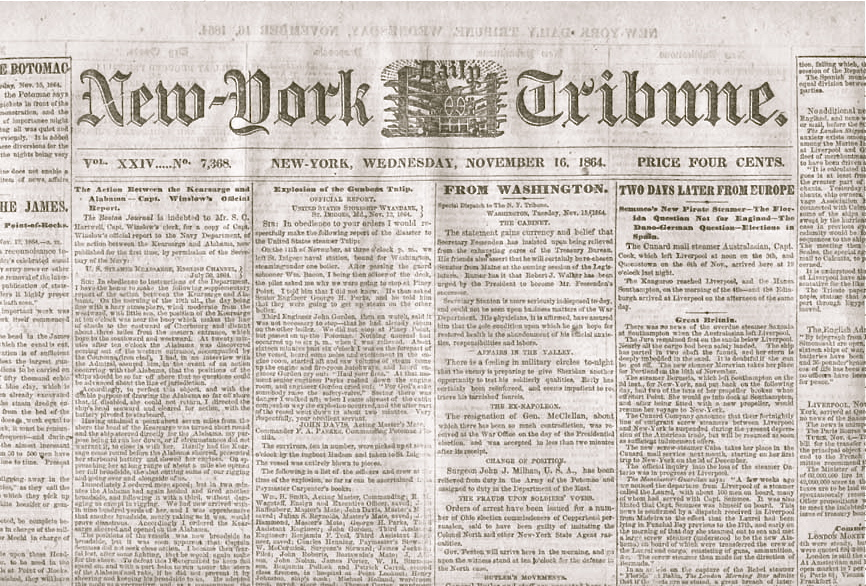
The Tribune spoke for the Republican party in 1864

The theory of journalism announced by Raymond in the Times marks another advance over the party principles of his predecessors. He thought that a newspaper might assume the rôle now of a party paper, now of an organ of non-partisan, independent thought, and still be regarded by the great body of its readers as steadily guided by principles of sincere public policy. An active ambition for political preferment prevented him from achieving this ideal. Although he professed conservatism only in those cases where conservatism was essential to the public good and radicalism in everything that might require radical treatment and radical reform, the spirit of opposition to the Tribune, as well as his temperamental leanings, carried him definitely to the conservative side. He was by nature inclined to accept the established order and make the best of it. Change, if it came, should come not through radical agitation and revolution, but by cautious and gradual evolution. The world needed brushing, not harrowing. Such ideas, as he applied them to journalism, appealed to moderate men, reflected the opinions of a large and influential class somewhere between the advanced thinkers and theorists and the mass of men more likely to be swayed by passions of approbation or protest than by reason.

It was the tone of the Times that especially distinguished it from its contemporaries. In his first issue Raymond announced his purpose to write in temperate and measured language and to get into a passion as rarely as possible. "There are few things in this world which it is worth while to get angry about; and they are just the things anger will not improve." In controversy he meant to avoid abusive language. His style was gentle, candid, and decisive, and achieved its purpose by facility, clearness, and moderation rather than by powerful fervor and invective. His editorials were generally cautious, impersonal, and finished in form. With abundant self-respect and courtesy, he avoided, as one of his coadjutors said, vulgar abuse of individuals, unjust criticism, or narrow and personal ideas. He had that degree and kind of intelligence that enabled him to appreciate two principles of modern journalism—the application of social ethics to editorial conduct and the maintenance of a comprehensive spirit. As he used them, these were positive, not negative virtues.

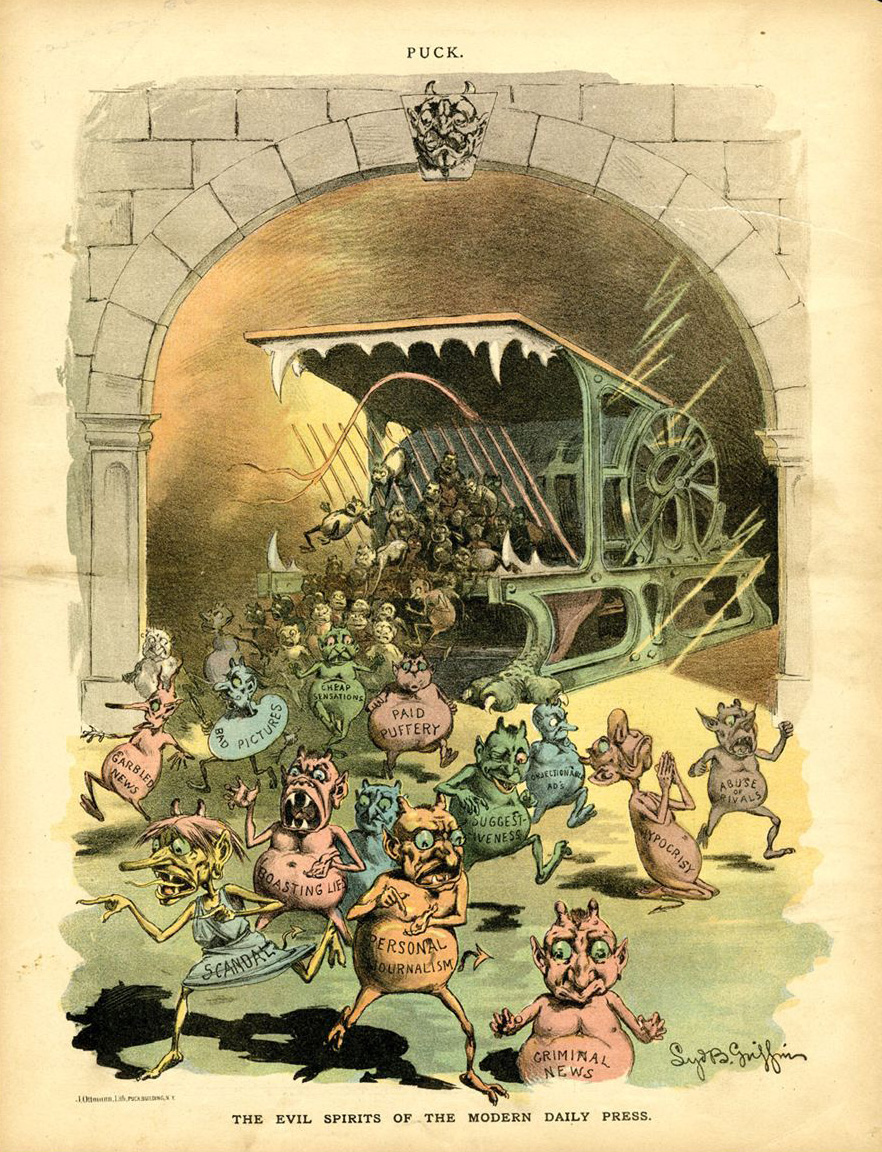
Vile gossip and scandal spew from the press in the 1888 Puck cartoon

Raymond's contribution to journalism was not revolutionizing innovations but a general improving and refining of its tone, a balancing of its parts, and sensitizing it to popular taste. Taking The Times of London as his model, he tried to combine in his paper the English standard of trustworthiness, stability, inclusiveness, and exclusiveness, with the energy and news initiative of the best American journalism.

=== Late 19th century ===
Newspapers continued to play a major political role. In rural areas, the weekly newspaper published in the county seat played a major role. In the larger cities, different factions of the party have their own papers. During the Reconstruction era (1865–1877), leading editors increasingly turned against corruption represented by President Grant and his Republican Party. They strongly supported the third-party Liberal Republican movement of 1872, which nominated Horace Greeley for president. The Democratic Party endorsed Greeley officially, but many Democrats could not accept the idea of voting for the man who had been their fiercest enemy for decades; he lost in a landslide. Most of the 430 Republican newspapers in the Reconstruction South were edited by scalawags (Southern born white men) – only 20 percent were edited by carpetbaggers (recent arrivals from the North who formed the opposing faction in the Republican Party. White businessmen generally boycotted Republican papers, which survived through government patronage.)

Newspapers were a major growth industry in the late nineteenth century. The number of daily papers grew from 971 to 2226, 1880 to 1900. Weekly newspapers were published in smaller towns, especially county seats, or for German, Swedish and other immigrant subscribers. They grew from 9,000 to 14,000, and by 1900 the United States published more than half of the newspapers in the world, with two copies per capita. Out on the frontier, the first need for a boom town was a newspaper. The new states of North and South Dakota by 1900 had 25 daily papers, and 315 weeklies. Oklahoma was still not a state, but it could boast of nine dailies and nearly a hundred weeklies. In the largest cities the newspapers competed fiercely, using newsboys to hawk copies and carriers to serve subscribers. Financially, the major papers depended on advertising, which paid in proportion to the circulation base. By the 1890s in New York City, especially during the Spanish–American War, circulations reached 1 million a day for Pulitzer's World and Hearst's Journal. While smaller papers relied on loyal Republican or Democratic readers who appreciated the intense partisanship of the editorials, the big-city papers realized they would lose half their potential audience by excessive partisanship, so they took a more ambiguous position, except at election time.

Journalism was an attractive, but low-paid profession that drew ambitious young men starting their careers, and a few women. Editors were too busy condensing and rewriting and meeting deadlines to provide much tutelage. Reporters learned the craft by reading and discussing news stories among themselves, and following the tips and suggestions of more experienced colleagues. Reporters developed a personal rather than a professional code of ethics, and implemented their own work rules. Falsification was never allowed but increasingly the editors demanded sensationalistic perspectives, and juicy tidbits regardless of the news value.

After the Civil War, there were several transitions in the newspaper industry. Many of the main founders of the modern press died, including Greeley, Raymond, Bennett, Bowles. and Bryant. Their successors continued the basic policies and approaches, but were less innovative. The civil war put a premium on news reporting, rather than editorials, and the news columns became increasingly important, with speed of the essence as multiple newspapers competed on the city streets for customers. The major papers issued numerous editions the day each with blaring headlines to capture attention. Reporting became more prestigious. There was no newspaper that exerted the national influence of Greeley's New York Tribune. Western cities, developed influential newspapers of their own in Chicago, San Francisco and St. Louis; the Southern press went into eclipse as the region lost its political influence and talented young journalists headed North for their careers. The Associated Press became increasingly important and efficient, producing a vast quantity of reasonably accurate, factual reporting on state and national events that editors used to service the escalating demand for news. Circulation growth was facilitated by new technology, such as the stereotype, by which 10 or more high-speed presses could print the same pages.

Generic advertising of medical nostrums and other products typical of that appearing on a preprinted "patent inside" sheet used in most rural weeklies.

After 1865 there was a heavy migration to the western territories from Americans and Europeans. Good farmland was very cheap and railroads offered low prices and even free transportation to attract farmer. The growth of a state or territory could be measured by the growth of the areas newspapers. With settlers pushing westward communities were considered stable if they had a newspaper publishing. This was a form of communication for all of the settlers and pioneers that lived in the far, rural communities. Larger, more established towns would begin to grow multiple newspapers. One of the papers would promote a Democratic view and the other Republican.

Rural weekly papers often used patent insides. Instead of printing four pages on the front and back of a large sheet of paper, they printed only pages 1 and 4. Pages 2 and 4 arrived already printed, and filled with advertising, essays and stories. The paper was very cheap to buy, and made the newspaper much more attractive to women.

== Mass markets, yellow journalism and muckrakers, 1890–1920 ==
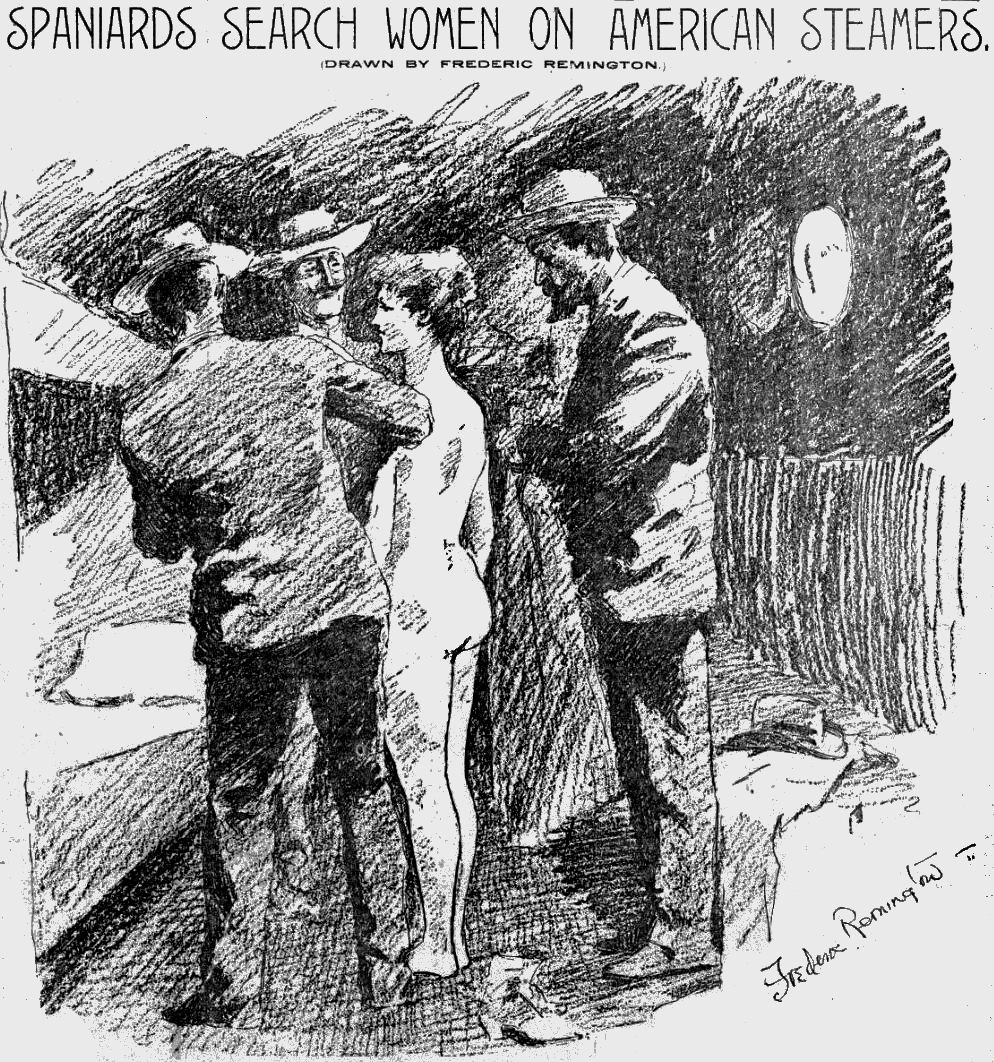
Male Spanish officials strip search an American woman tourist in Cuba looking for messages from rebels; front page "yellow journalism" from Hearst (artist: Remington)

=== Muckrakers ===
A muckraker is an American English term for a person who investigates and exposes issues of corruption. They shared widely held values in their exposure of political corruption, corporate crime, child labor, conditions in slums and prisons, unsanitary conditions in food processing plants (such as meat), fraudulent claims by manufacturers of patent medicines, labor racketeering, and similar topics. In British English however the term is applied to sensationalist scandal-mongering journalism, not driven by any social value.

The term muckraker is most usually associated in America with a group of American investigative reporters, novelists and critics in the Progressive Era from the 1890s to the 1920s. It also applies to post 1960 journalists who follow in the tradition of those from that period. See History of American newspapers for Muckrakers in the daily press.

Muckrakers have most often sought, in the past, to serve the public interest by uncovering crime, corruption, waste, fraud and abuse in both the public and private sectors. In the early 1900s, muckrakers shed light on such issues by writing books and articles for popular magazines and newspapers such as Cosmopolitan, The Independent, Collier's Weekly and McClure's. Some of the most famous of the early muckrakers are Ida Tarbell, Lincoln Steffens, and Ray Stannard Baker.

==== History of term muckraker ====
President Theodore Roosevelt coined the term 'muckraker' in a 1906 speech when he likened the muckrakers to the Man with the Muckrake, a character in John Bunyan's Pilgrim's Progress (1678).

Roosevelt disliked their relentless negativism and he attacked them for stretching the truth:

There are, in the body politic, economic and social, many and grave evils, and there is urgent necessity for the sternest war upon them. There should be relentless exposure of and attack upon every evil man whether politician or business man, every evil practice, whether in politics, in business, or in social life. I hail as a benefactor every writer or speaker, every man who, on the platform, or in book, magazine, or newspaper, with merciless severity makes such attack, provided always that he in his turn remembers that the attack is of use only if it is absolutely truthful.

==== Early muckrakers ====
- Nellie Bly (1864–1922) Ten Days in a Mad-House
- Thomas W. Lawson (1857–1924) Frenzied Finance (1906) on Amalgamated Copper stock scandal
- Fremont Older (1856–1935) San Francisco corruption and the case of Tom Mooney
- Lincoln Steffens (1866–1936) The Shame of the Cities (1904)
- Charles Edward Russell (1860–1941)—investigated Beef Trust, Georgia's prison
- Ida Minerva Tarbell (1857–1944) expose, The History of the Standard Oil Company
- Burton J. Hendrick (1870–1949)—"The Story of Life Insurance" May–November 1906 McClure's magazine
- Westbrook Pegler (1894–1969)—exposed crime in labor unions in the 1940s
- I.F. Stone (1907–1989)—McCarthyism and Vietnam War, published newsletter, I.F. Stone's Weekly
- George Seldes (1890–1995)—Freedom of the Press (1935) and Lords of the Press (1938), blacklisted during the 1950s period of McCarthyism

==== Contemporary muckrakers ====
- Wayne Barrett—investigative journalist, senior editor of the Village Voice; wrote on mystique and misdeeds in Rudy Giuliani's conduct as mayor of New York City, Grand Illusion: The Untold Story of Rudy Giuliani and 9/11 (2006)
- Richard Behar—investigative journalist, two-time winner of the 'Jack Anderson Award'. Anderson himself once praised Behar as "one of the most dogged of our watchdogs"
- Juan Gonzalez (journalist)—investigative reporter, columnist in New York Daily News; authored book on Rudy Giuliani and George W. Bush administration's handling of the aftermath of the September 11 attacks in New York City and illnesses from Ground Zero dust: Fallout: The Environmental Consequences of the World Trade Center Collapse (2004)
- John Howard Griffin (1920–1980)—white journalist who disguised himself as a black man to write about racial injustice in the south
- Seymour Hersh—My Lai massacre, Israeli nuclear weapons program, Henry Kissinger, the Kennedys, 2003 invasion of Iraq, Abu Ghraib abuses
- Malcolm Johnson—exposed organized crime on the New York waterfront
- Jonathan Kwitny (1941–1998)—wrote numerous investigative articles for The Wall Street Journal
- Jack Newfield—muckraking columnist; wrote for New York Post; and wrote The Full Rudy: The Man, the Myth, the Mania [about Rudy Giuliani] (2003) and other titles
- Bob Woodward and Carl Bernstein—breakthrough journalists for Washington Post on the Watergate scandal; authors of All the President's Men, non-fiction account of the scandal

=== Yellow journalism ===
Yellow journalism is a pejorative reference to journalism that features scandal-mongering, sensationalism, jingoism or other unethical or unprofessional practices by news media organizations or individual journalists.

The term originated during the circulation battles between Joseph Pulitzer's New York World and William Randolph Hearst's New York Journal from 1895 to about 1898, and can refer specifically to this period. Both papers were accused by critics of sensationalizing the news in order to drive up circulation, although the newspapers did serious reporting as well. The New York Press coined the term "Yellow Journalism" in early 1897 to describe the papers of Pulitzer and Hearst.

==== Origins: Pulitzer v. Hearst ====
Joseph Pulitzer purchased the World in 1882 after making the St. Louis Post-Dispatch the dominant daily in that city. The publisher had gotten his start editing a German-language publication in St. Louis, and saw a great untapped market in the nation's immigrant classes. Pulitzer strove to make The World an entertaining read, and filled his paper with pictures, games and contests that drew in readers, particularly those who used English as a second language. Crime stories filled many of the pages, with headlines like "Was He A Suicide?" and "Screaming for Mercy". Pulitzer provided a bargain: he only charged two cents per issue but gave readers eight and sometimes 12 pages of information (the only other two-cent paper in the city never exceeded four pages).

While there were many sensational stories in the World, they were by no means the only pieces, or even the dominant ones. Pulitzer believed that newspapers were public institutions with a duty to improve society, and he put the World in the service of social reform. During a heat wave in 1883, World reporters went into the Manhattan's tenements, writing stories about the appalling living conditions of immigrants and the toll the heat took on the children. Stories headlined "How Babies Are Baked" and "Lines of Little Hearses" spurred reform and drove up circulation.

Just two years after Pulitzer took it over, the World became the highest circulation newspaper in New York, aided in part by its strong ties to the Democratic Party. Older publishers, envious of Pulitzer's success, began criticizing the World, harping on its crime stories and stunts while ignoring its more serious reporting—trends that influenced the popular perception of yellow journalism, both then and now. Charles Dana, editor of the New York Sun, attacked the World and said Pulitzer was "deficient in judgment and in staying power."

Pulitzer's approach made an impression on William Randolph Hearst, a mining heir who acquired the San Francisco Examiner from his father in 1887. Hearst read the World while studying at Harvard University and resolved to make the Examiner as bright as Pulitzer's paper. Under his leadership, the Examiner devoted 24 percent of its space to crime, presenting the stories as morality plays, and sprinkled adultery and "nudity" (by 19th century standards) on the front page.

A month after taking over the paper, the Examiner ran this headline about a hotel fire:

HUNGRY, FRANTIC FLAMES. They Leap Madly Upon the Splendid Pleasure Palace by the Bay of Monterey, Encircling Del Monte in Their Ravenous Embrace From Pinnacle to Foundation. Leaping Higher, Higher, Higher, With Desperate Desire. Running Madly Riotous Through Cornice, Archway and Facade. Rushing in Upon the Trembling Guests with Savage Fury. Appalled and Panic-Stricken the Breathless Fugitives Gaze Upon the Scene of Terror. The Magnificent Hotel and Its Rich Adornments Now a Smoldering heap of Ashes. The "Examiner" Sends a Special Train to Monterey to Gather Full Details of the Terrible Disaster. Arrival of the Unfortunate Victims on the Morning's Train—A History of Hotel del Monte—The Plans for Rebuilding the Celebrated Hostelry—Particulars and Supposed Origin of the Fire.

Hearst could go overboard in his crime coverage; one of his early pieces, regarding a "band of murderers", attacked the police for forcing Examiner reporters to do their work for them. But while indulging in these stunts, the Examiner also increased its space for international news, and sent reporters out to uncover municipal corruption and inefficiency. In one celebrated story, Examiner reporter Winifred Black was admitted into a San Francisco hospital and discovered that indigent women were treated with "gross cruelty". The entire hospital staff was fired the morning the piece appeared.

==== New York ====
With the Examiner's success established by the early 1890s, Hearst began shopping for a New York newspaper. Hearst purchased the New York Journal in 1895, a penny paper that Pulitzer's brother Albert had sold to a Cincinnati publisher the year before.

Metropolitan newspapers started going after department store advertising in the 1890s, and discovered the larger circulation base, the better. This drove Hearst; following Pulitzer's earlier strategy, he kept the Journal's price at one cent (compared to The Worlds two cent price) while doubling the size to 16 pages. Crime news featured big bold headlines, and startling graphic art. The approach worked, and as the Journals circulation jumped to 150,000, Pulitzer had to cut his price to a penny, hoping to drive his young competitor (who was subsidized by his family's fortune) into bankruptcy. In a counterattack, Hearst raided the staff of the World in 1896. In the 1880s Pulitzer had annoyed his rivals when he raided their staffs; now it was his turn. Hearst picked off the best journalists, especially those who considered Pulitzer a difficult man to work for.

Although the competition between the World and the Journal was fierce, the papers were temperamentally alike. Both were Democratic, both were sympathetic to labor and immigrants (a sharp contrast to publishers like the New York Tribune's Whitelaw Reid, who blamed their poverty on moral defects), and both invested enormous resources in their Sunday publications, which functioned like weekly magazines, going beyond the normal scope of daily journalism.

Their Sunday entertainment features included the first color comic strip pages, and some theorize that the term yellow journalism originated there, while as noted above the New York Press left the term it invented undefined. The Yellow Kid, a comic strip revolving around a bald child in a yellow nightshirt, became exceptionally popular when cartoonist Richard Outcault began drawing it in the World in early 1896. When Hearst predictably hired Outcault away, Pulitzer asked artist George Luks to continue the strip with his characters, giving the city two Yellow Kids. The use of "yellow journalism" as a synonym for over-the-top sensationalism in the U.S. apparently started with more serious newspapers commenting on the excesses of "the Yellow Kid papers".

Paul Moore and Sandra Gabriele use media theory to explore the nationwide rise of Sunday editions of big city newspapers from the 1870s to the 1930s. The new media used the innovations of yellow journalism and reflected the desires of audiences and editors. Sunday papers expanded the readership to include children, They reached new audiences by developing home delivery. They downplayed hard news and emphasized features, celebrities, color, comics, soft news and the information needs of consumers. The Sunday papers reflected a new set of rules for communication and participation in a modern world based on advertisements and consumption. They cultivated a consumer culture that set the stage for the new advertising techniques of radio in the 1920s and 1930s.

==== Spanish–American War ====
Pulitzer and Hearst are often credited (or blamed) for drawing the nation into the Spanish–American War with sensationalist stories or outright lying. In fact, the vast majority of Americans did not live in New York City, and the decision makers who did live there probably relied more on staid newspapers like the Times, the Sun or the Post. The most famous example of the exaggeration is the apocryphal story that artist Frederic Remington telegrammed Hearst to tell him all was quiet in Cuba and "There will be no war." Hearst responded "Please remain. You furnish the pictures and I'll furnish the war." The story (a version of which appears in the Hearst-inspired Orson Welles' film Citizen Kane) first appeared in the memoirs of reporter James Creelman in 1901, and there is no other source for it.

But Hearst was a war hawk after a rebellion broke out in Cuba in 1895. Stories of Cuban virtue and Spanish brutality soon dominated his front page. While the accounts were of dubious accuracy, the newspaper readers of the 19th century did not need, or necessarily want, his stories to be pure nonfiction. Historian Michael Robertson has said that "Newspaper reporters and readers of the 1890s were much less concerned with distinguishing among fact-based reporting, opinion and literature."

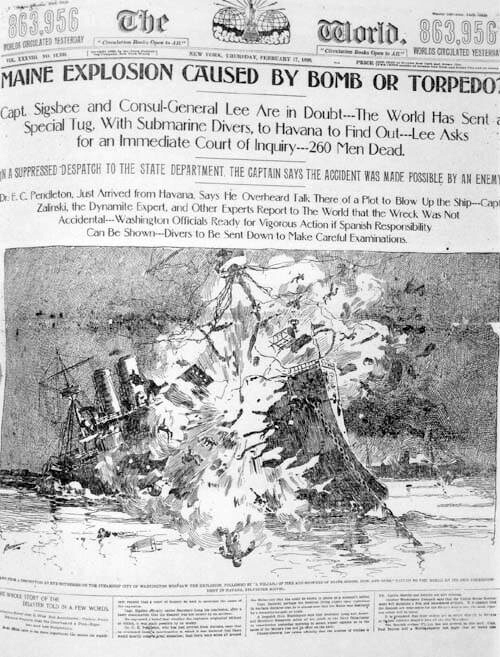
Pulitzer's treatment in the World emphasizes horrible explosion

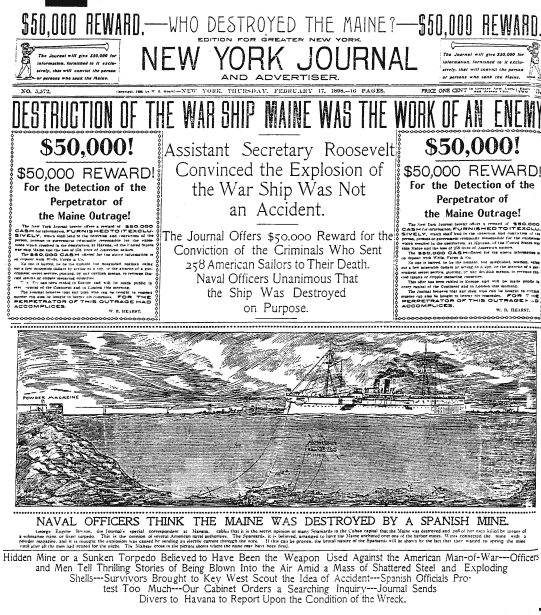
Hearst's treatment was more effective and focused on the enemy who set the bomb—and offered a huge reward to readers

Hearst's treatment was more effective and focused on the enemy who set the bomb—and offered a huge reward to readers. Pulitzer, though lacking Hearst's resources, kept the story on his front page. The yellow press covered the revolution extensively and often inaccurately, but conditions on Cuba were horrific enough. The island was in a terrible economic depression, and Spanish general Valeriano Weyler, sent to crush the rebellion, herded Cuban peasants into concentration camps and caused hundreds of thousands of deaths. Having clamored for a fight for two years, Hearst took credit for the conflict when it came: A week after the United States declared war on Spain, he ran "How do you like the Journal's war?" on his front page. Modern scholarship rejects the notion that Hearst or Yellow Journalism caused the war. In fact, President William McKinley never read the Journal, and newspapers like the Tribune and the New York Evening Post, both staunchly Republican, demanded restraint. Moreover, journalism historians have noted that yellow journalism was largely confined to New York City, and that newspapers in the rest of the country did not follow their lead. The Journal and the World were not among the top ten sources of news in regional papers, and the stories simply did not make a splash outside Gotham. War came because public opinion was sickened by the bloodshed, and because conservative leaders like McKinley realized that Spain had lost control of Cuba. These factors weighed more on the president's mind than the melodramas in the New York Journal.

=== After the War ===
Hearst placed his newspapers at the service of the Democrats during the 1900 presidential election. He later campaigned for his party's presidential nomination, but lost much of his personal prestige when columnist Ambrose Bierce and editor Arthur Brisbane published separate columns months apart that called for the assassination of McKinley. When McKinley was shot on September 6, 1901, the Republican press went livid, accusing Hearst of driving Leon Czolgosz to the deed. Hearst did not know of Bierce's column and claimed to have pulled Brisbane's after it ran in a first edition, but the incident would haunt him for the rest of his life and all but destroyed his presidential ambitions.

Pulitzer returned the World to its crusading roots as the new century dawned. By the time of his death in 1911, the World was a widely respected publication, the flagship of the Democratic Party, and would remain a progressive organ until its demise in 1931.

=== In popular culture ===
In many movies, sitcoms and other works of fiction, reporters often use yellow journalism against the main character, which typically works to set up the reporter character as an antagonist. This is done so often that it is sometimes considered to be a cliché.

For instance in the Spider-Man franchise, publisher J. Jonah Jameson spitefully and constantly smears the superhero in his Daily Bugle despite having his suspicions repeatedly proven wrong. Likewise, in the 1997 James Bond movie Tomorrow Never Dies, the deranged media magnate and main antagonist Elliot Carver (played by Jonathan Pryce) tries to start a war between Great Britain and China via sensationalized news stories; in the movie, he even alludes to Hearst's role in the Spanish–American War, using the apocryphal quote "You provide the pictures and I'll provide the war" as an excuse to prove that his plot is not new. (This quotation is also in Orson Welles' classic film Citizen Kane.) In Thomas Harris' novel Red Dragon, from the Hannibal Lecter series, a sleazy yellow journalist named Freddy Lounds, who writes for the National Tattler tabloid, is tortured and set aflame for penning a negative article about serial killer Francis Dolarhyde.

In the movie Bob Roberts, Senator Roberts characterizes media investigations into his business dealings (and particularly the links between his anti-drugs charity and CIA drug trafficking) as "yellow journalism".

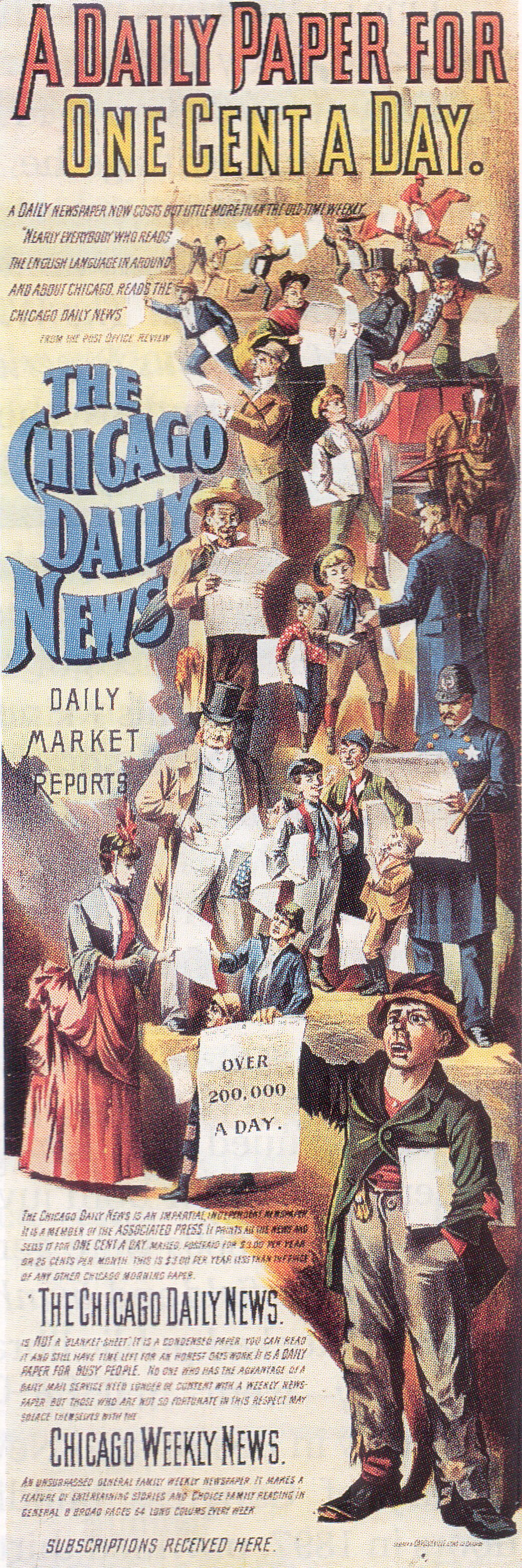
The Chicago Daily News in 1901 relied on newsboys hawking the headlines.

=== Newsboys in the front line of the circulation wars ===
Sensationalism made readers want to purchase newspapers, and circulation managers had to find new ways to handle the much heavier load. They typically relied primarily on newspaper hawkers or newsboy who sold individual copies of one paper on downtown streets. There also were plenty of newsstands that sold different titles from a stationary stand or storefront. Vending machines came in the 1890s. Home delivery was not uncommon in the early 1900, but became increasingly important as paperboys began to deliver more newspapers to subscribers. A busy corner would have several hawkers, each representing one major newspapers. They might carry a poster board with giant headlines, provided by the newspaper. The downtown newsboy started fading out after World War II, when publishers began to emphasize home delivery. Teenage newsboys delivered papers on a daily basis for subscribers who paid them monthly. Hawkers typically purchased a bundle of 100 copies from a wholesaler, who in turn purchased them from the publisher. Legally every state considered the newsboys to be independent contractors, and not employees, so they generally were not subject to child labor laws.

Newsboys' were not employees of the newspapers but rather purchased the papers from wholesalers in packets of 100 and peddled them as independent agents. Unsold papers could not be returned. The newsboys typically earned around 30 cents a day and often worked until late at night. Cries of "Extra, extra!" were often heard into the morning hours as newsboys attempted to hawk every last paper.

The local delivery boy pulling a wagon or riding a bicycle while tossing the morning or evening paper onto the front porch was a product of the 1930s. Newspapers lost circulation and advertising as the economy went down, and needed to boost revenues and cut expenses. Starting in 1930, the International Circulation Managers' Association launched a national operation to show local newspaper management how to boost home newspaper readership. The designed a prepackaged curriculum in door-to-door subscription marketing. This movement created the middle-class newspaper boy and permanently altered the relationship between teenage years and entrepreneurial enterprise. Circulation managers solved their problem. The teenage boys. They were still independent contractors rather than employees, but the circulation manager designed the routes, and taught the boys how to collect and account for the subscription money. To inspire the young entrepreneurs, they created a distinctive gendered managerial philosophy of masculine guidance. It inspired the boys' entrepreneurship and stabilized their work habits, while providing extra money for tight family budgets.

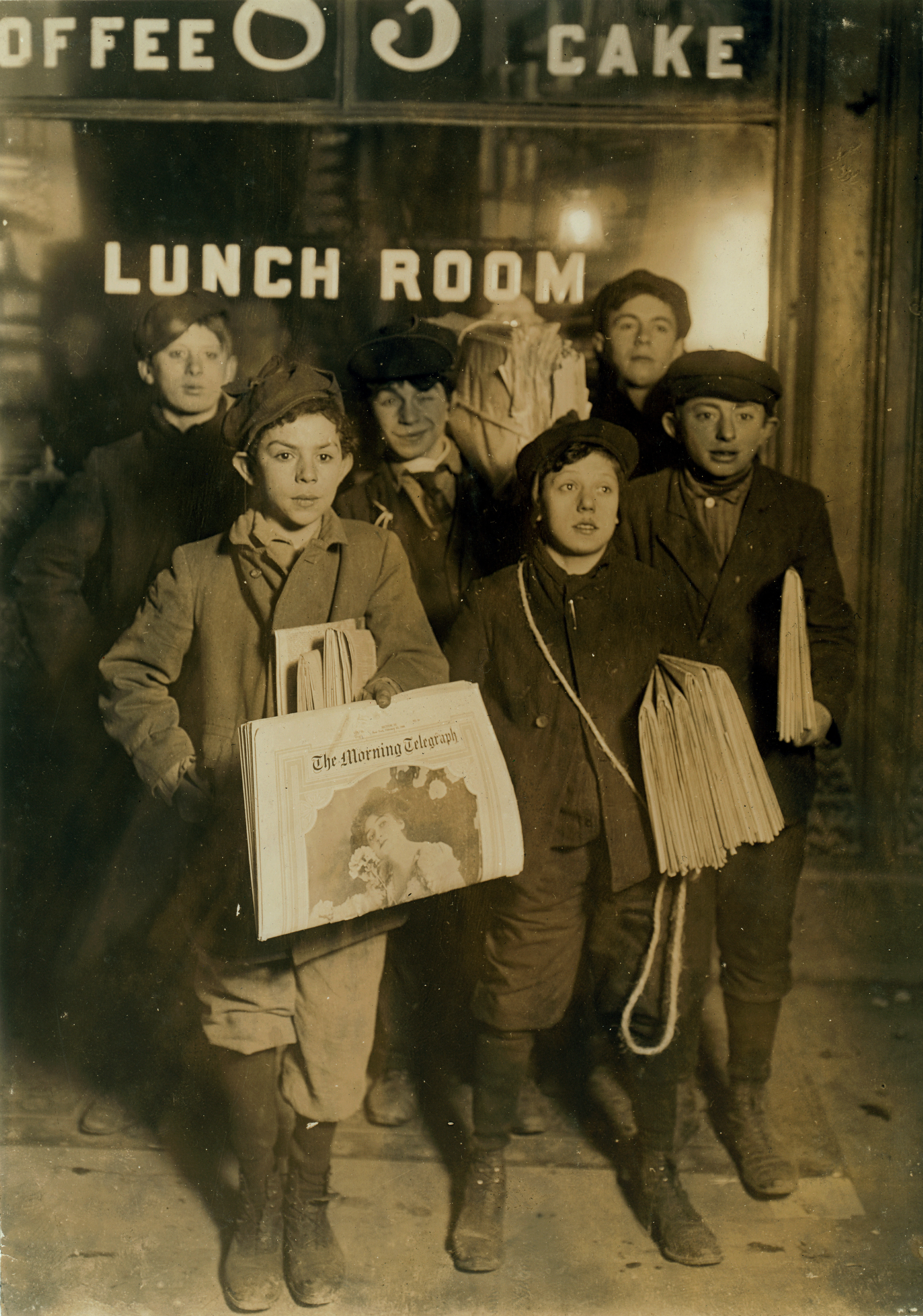
"Boys Selling Newspapers on Brooklyn Bridge" by Lewis Hine, 1908

American photographer Lewis Hine crusaded against child labor by taking photographs that exposed bad conditions, especially in factories and coal mines. In sharp contrast, however, Hine's photographs of newsboys them did not depict another appalling form of dangerous child labor or immigrant poverty, for they were not employees. There were working on their own as independent young entrepreneurs and Hine captures the image of comradeship, youthful masculinity and emerging entrepreneurship. The symbolic newsboy became an iconic image in discourses about childhood, ambition and independence.

Newsboys became an iconic image of youthful entrepreneurship. Famous American newsboys included Bruce Barton, Ralph Bunche, Joe DiMaggio, Thomas Edison, Dwight D. Eisenhower, Joe Kennedy, Sam Rayburn, Walter Reuther, David Sarnoff, Cardinal Spellman, Harry S. Truman and Mark Twain.

== Ethnic press ==
While the English language press served the general population, practically every ethnic group had its own newspapers in their own language. Many immigrant populations in the 19th century were drawn to the rich farmlands of the Great Plains states such as Minnesota, Nebraska, and Iowa. In small communities that drew large influxes of specific ethnic groups community newspapers became a place where political and religious interests could be promoted in familiar languages. Many of these papers also wanted to embody the spirit of American democracy within their readers. One paper committed to ensuring all Danish-American citizens took part and exercised their rights was the Den Danske Pionerr or The Danish Pioneer in translation. This paper was backed by Sophus F. Neble a Danish immigrant who had failed at dairy farming and instead set to typing and enhancing the paper in Omaha, Nebraska. Under Neble that paper rose to a circulation of 40,000 during World War I.

German publishers were one of the most influential immigrant groups in developing the ethnic press. By 1890 there were 1,000 German-language newspapers published each year in the United States. Prior to World War I Germans were accepted as a reputable immigrant group with over five million immigrants moving to the country between 1820 and 1924. However once America entered the conflict national opinion changed and German culture was no longer welcome in the country. A large amount of anger was focused at German newspapers which some American's viewed as supporting Germany in the war effort. In October 1917 Congress passed legislation that sought to control foreign-language press. The laws stated that newspapers must translate all printed material concerning the war. The German papers nearly all folded in World War I, and after 1950 the other ethnic groups had largely dropped foreign language papers. This drop of foreign-press publications during World War I was not only felt by German-Americans. In 1915 the circulation of the daily Yiddish newspapers was half a million in New York City alone, and 600,000 nationally. In addition thousands more subscribed to the numerous weekly papers and the many magazines.

Representative was the situation in Chicago, where the Polish Americans sustained diverse political cultures, each with its own newspaper. In 1920 the community had a choice of five daily papers - from the Socialist Dziennik Ludowy [People's daily] (1907–25) to the Polish Roman Catholic Union's Dziennik Zjednoczenia [Union daily] (1921–39) - all of which supported workers' struggles for better working conditions and were part of a broader program of cultural and educational activities. The decision to subscribe to a particular paper reaffirmed a particular ideology or institutional network based on ethnicity and class, which lent itself to different alliances and different strategies. Most papers preached assimilation into middle class American values and supported Americanization programs, but still included news of the home country.

After 1965, there was a large surge of new immigration, especially from Asia. They set up few major papers. By the 21st century, over 10 percent of the population was Hispanic. They patronized Spanish-language radio and television, but outside large cities it was hard to find Spanish newspapers, books or magazines for sale.

== Chains and syndicates, 1900–1960 ==
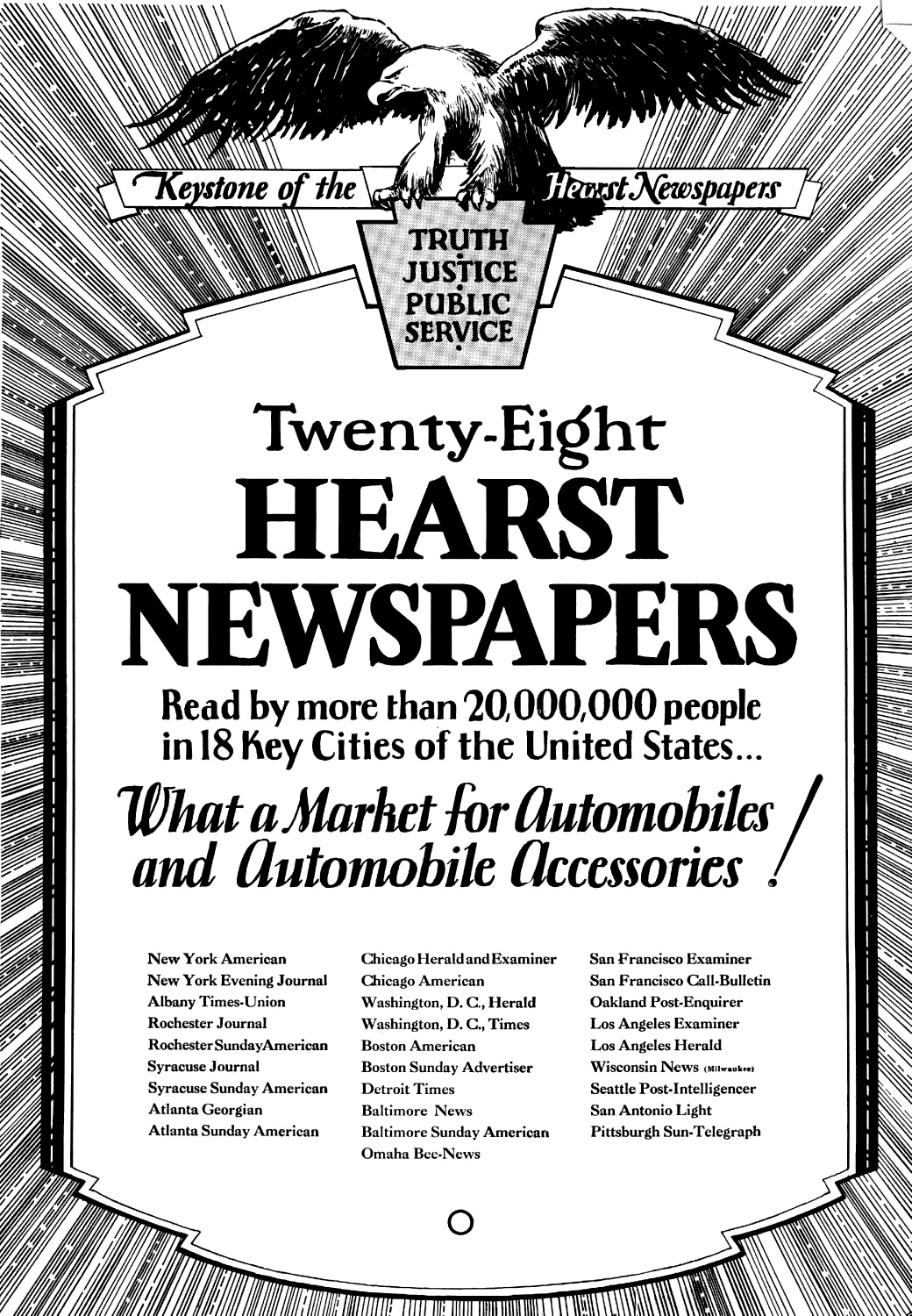
Ad for the Hearst chain, circa 1930

E. W. Scripps founder of the first national newspaper chain in the United States, sought in the early years of the 20th century to create syndicated services based on product differentiation while appealing to the needs of his readers. Success, Scripps believed, depended on providing what competing newspapers did not. To achieve this end while controlling costs and centralizing management, Scripps developed a national wire service (United Press International), a news features service (Newspaper Enterprise Association), and other services. Scripps successfully reached a large market at low costs in new and different ways and captured the interests of a wider range of readers, especially women who were more interested in features than in political news. However, the local editors lost a degree of autonomy and local news coverage diminished significantly.

In part to aid in his political ambitions, Hearst opened newspapers in other cities, among them Chicago, Los Angeles and Boston. By the mid-1920s he had a nationwide string of 28 newspapers, among them the Los Angeles Examiner, the Boston American, the Chicago Examiner, the Detroit Times, the Seattle Post-Intelligencer and The Washington Times and Washington Herald and his flagship the San Francisco Examiner. In 1924 he opened the New York Daily Mirror, a racy tabloid frankly imitating the New York Daily News. Among his other holdings were the magazines Cosmopolitan, and Harper's Bazaar; two news services, Universal News and International News Service; King Features Syndicate; and a film company, Cosmopolitan Productions, as well as real estate. Hearst used his influence to help Franklin D. Roosevelt win the 1932 Democratic nomination. However he broke with Roosevelt in 1935 because Roosevelt did not want to fund the veterans' bonus. After that the Hearst chain became the bitter enemy of the New Deal from the right. The other major chains likewise were hostile, and in 1936 Roosevelt had the support of only 10% of the nation's newspapers (by circulation).

== Competition: television and Internet, 1970–present ==
A 2015 report from the Brookings Institution shows that the number of newspapers per hundred million population fell from 1,200 (in 1945) to 400 in 2014. Over that same period, circulation per capita declined from 35 percent in the mid-1940s to under 15 percent. The number of newspaper journalists has decreased from 43,000 in 1978 to 33,000 in 2015. Other traditional news media have also suffered. Since 1980 the television networks have lost half their audience for evening newscasts; the audience for radio news has shrunk by 40%.

The California Post launched in 2026 as a local version of the New York Post.

=== Rapid decline in circulation ===
Advertising revenue as a percent of US GDP shows a rise in audio-visual and digital advertising at the expense of print media.

According to annual analyses of circulation conducted by the Pew Research Center, daily newspaper circulation in the United States peaked in 1984, while Sunday paper circulation continued to rise until 1993. Since that time, the readership of newspapers has been on a steady decline. This coincides approximately with the beginning of home Internet use[cite]. The rate of the decline in readership increased greatly in 2004, and continued experience its sharpest declines in recent history. The recent slide continues a decades-long trend and adds to the woes of a mature industry already struggling with layoffs and facing the potential sale of some of its flagships. In addition newsstand sales of magazines fell more than 4 percent, to about 48.7 million copies. Among domestic newsweeklies, Time magazine reported the biggest drop. Analysts pointed to the increased use of the Internet, noting that more people in 2006 read The New York Times online than on paper. Newspaper readership goes up with education, and education levels are rising. That favorable trend is offset by the choice of people in each age group to read fewer papers.

The decline in readership and revenues continued steadily by year after that. American dailies lost 60% of their ad revenue--$30 billion—between 2005 and 2014. The typical response is a drastic cut in the employment of journalists. Their numbers also fell 60% from about 50,000 in 2005 to 20,000 in 2014.

By 2018, the overall readership of US newspapers had dropped to 1940 levels, and advertising revenue was at the same level as it had been in 1980. Resisting somewhat the trend to become fully digital, in 2018 sixty-five percent of advertising revenue still stemmed from non-digital ads.

=== Corporate turmoil ===
After 1950 newspaper readership grew slower than the population. After 1990 the number of readers started to decline. The number of papers also declined, especially as afternoon papers collapsed in the face of television news. However sales of advertising remained strong and profits were still high. In 2002, newspapers reported advertising revenues of $44 billion. According to Morton Research, a market analysis firm, in 2003, the 13 major publicly traded newspaper companies earned an average pretax profit margin of 19 percent.

From 1987 to 2003 showed an industry in transition. Although 305 newspapers ceased daily publication during this period, 64% of these newspapers continued to serve their markets as weeklies, merged dailies, or zoned editions. The 111 dailies that went out of business were offset by 63 dailies that started publication. In effect, the newspaper industry lost service in 48 markets during 17 years. After 2003 the process speeded up, as revenue from advertising fell and circulation declined, as more people relied on the internet for news.

=== Spanish and Asian language newspapers ===
The first Spanish-language newspapers in the United States were El Misisipí and El Mensagero Luisianés, which began publication in New Orleans in 1808 and 1809. La Gaceta de Texas and El Mexicano, the first newspapers in what is now considered the Southwest, were written and typeset in Nacogdoches, Texas, but printed in Natchitoches, Louisiana, in 1813. They supported the Mexican independence movement.

The Latino Print Network estimated the combined circulation of all Hispanic newspapers in the United States at 16.2 million in 2003. Mainstream (English) daily newspapers owned 46 Hispanic publications—nearly all of them weeklies—that have a combined circulation of 2.9 million. From 1990 to 2000, the number of Hispanic newspapers alone nearly doubled from 355 to 652

In 1976 the Miami Herald started El Herald, a one-page Spanish insert that was reborn in 1987 as El Nuevo Herald, a daily supplement to the Miami Herald. El Nuevo Herald became independent of the Herald in 1998 and by 2003 had an average daily circulation of 90,300. In 1981, the Gannett chain entered daily Spanish publishing when it bought El Diario/La Prensa, a 52,000-circulation New York City tabloid that is the nation's oldest Spanish daily.

The Tribune Co., Belo Corp. and Knight Ridder launched daily Spanish-language papers in 2003. Hispanic-oriented newspapers and magazines generated $1.3 billion in revenue in 2002. By comparison, the operating revenue that year for Knight Ridder's 32 papers was $2.8 billion. Readership remains small, however. New York City already had two Spanish-language dailies with a combined circulation of about 100,000, as well as papers from Puerto Rico and the Dominican Republic and a score of weeklies. But Louis Sito said their "circulation levels were very, very minimal when compared to the population size." (New York, population 8 million, is 27 percent Hispanic; the Bronx, 1.3 million, is 48 percent Hispanic.) Sito urged Newsday publisher Raymond A. Jansen to launch a daily instead of a weekly, and Hoy premiered on November 16, 1998, with a circulation of 25,000. By 2003, Hoy sold 91,000 copies a day in the New York metro area. The Dallas-Fort Worth market contains 1.3 million Latinos—22 percent of the population and growing (estimated to reach 38 percent by 2006). The Dallas Morning News developed Al Día to entice that audience. The Monday-through-Saturday paper debuted in September 2003 with a staff of 50, an initial circulation of 40,000 and a newsstand price of 25 cents. Diario La Estrella began in 1994 as a dual-language insert of the Fort Worth Star-Telegram and first grew into an all-Spanish stand-alone paper with a twice-weekly total circulation of 75,000 copies distributed free via newsstands and selective home delivery.

With the notable exception of Viet Mercury, a now-defunct, 35,000-circulation weekly Vietnamese-language paper published by Knight Ridder's San Jose Mercury News, U.S. media companies have generally eschewed the Asian market even though daily papers in Chinese, Korean or Vietnamese are thriving in New York, San Francisco, Los Angeles and other cities. The Mandarin-language World Journal, which distributes from San Francisco to Toronto and states a circulation (unaudited) of 350,000. World Journal; its biggest competitor, Sing Tao (181,000 circulation unaudited); and Korea Times (254,000, also unaudited) are owned by international media giants based in Taiwan, Hong Kong and Seoul, respectively.

In 2014, Connecting Cleveland, a four-page paper with stories in English and Nepali was launched to serve Nepali-speaking Bhutanese families in the Cleveland, Ohio, area.

== See also ==
- African-American newspapers
- History of journalism
- History of newspaper publishing
- German American journalism
- Irish American journalism
- Mass media and American politics
- Preservation (library and archival science), for preservation of old copies
