= John Elihu Hall =

American lawyer, writer and publisher (1783–1829)

John Elihu Hall (December 27, 1783 – June 12, 1829) was an American lawyer, writer and publisher who was born and lived for most of his life in Philadelphia, Pennsylvania, with important parts of his career spent in Maryland.

== Biography ==
John E. Hall was the son of John Hall and Sarah Ewing Hall, and the grandson of John Ewing, one time provost of the University of Pennsylvania. His brother was the Ohio and Illinois writer James Hall.

He studied at Princeton University and was admitted to the bar in Philadelphia in 1805. In 1806, he began publishing the first law journal in the United States, the American Law Journal, in Baltimore. During this period he also served as professor at the University of Maryland, Baltimore.

Maintaining a modest writing career while practicing law, he eventually changed to full-time writing and publishing. His primary work was editing The Port Folio, beginning in 1816, which had been floundering since its original publisher (and friend of the family) Joseph Dennie died in 1812. John Hall, James Hall and Sarah Hall had all written works for The Port Folio under Dennie, and John Hall continued to rely heavily on James and Sarah while he was editor; however, he was never able to resurrect the original reputation the journal had, and his publication folded in 1827.

He continued to publish other books after the demise of The Port Folio. In 1829, he became ill and died.
