= Sarah Ewing Hall =

American poet

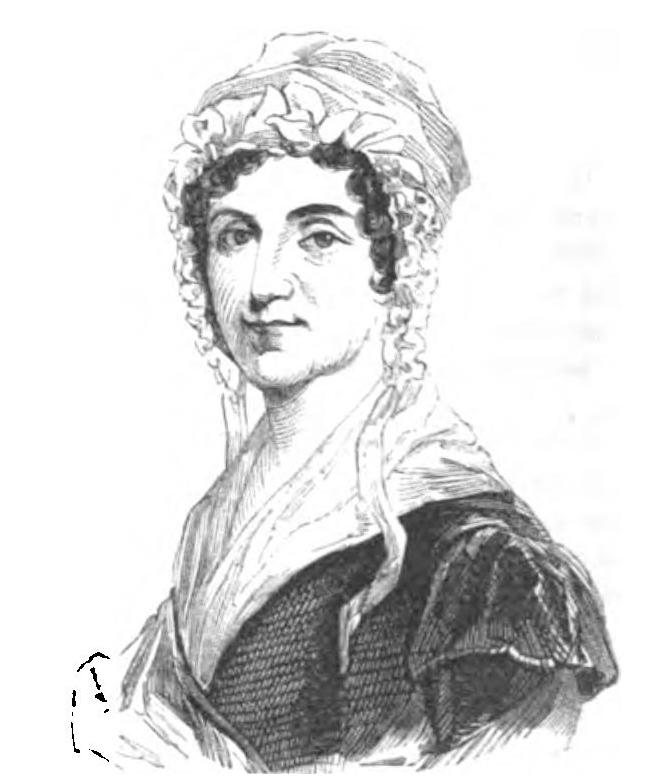
- Born: Sarah Ewing; 1761; Philadelphia
- Died: 1830 (aged 68–69)
- Occupation: Essayist, writer
- Parent(s): John Ewing

Sarah Ewing Hall (October 30, 1761 – April 8, 1830) was an American educator, poet, and essayist of Christian literature during the Romantic era,

She was born in Philadelphia, Pennsylvania, the daughter of the Reverend John Ewing, pastor of the First Presbyterian Church and Provost of the University of Pennsylvania, and Hannah (Sergeant) Ewing. She was taught at home by her father and by his learned guests' instructive dialogues. Her favorite subject was astronomy, where her father was an expert. She also gained vast knowledge of Greek and Latin when listening to her brothers recite.

In 1782, she married John Hall, who was the son of a wealthy Maryland planter, and they had eleven children, residing in relative solitude on his farm in Maryland for the next eight years. In 1790 the family returned to Philadelphia where John Hall served as secretary of the Pennsylvania land office and a U.S. marshal from 1799 to 1801.

In 1805, they moved to New Jersey, but later financial changes forced them to move back to Maryland, from where they returned to Philadelphia in 1811.

Two of her sons were John Elihu Hall and James Hall, both of whom were prominent publishers and writers.

She died in Philadelphia in 1830, and was buried in the Third Presbyterian Church burial ground.

== Writing career ==
Hall was an essayist and wrote for Joseph Dennie's Port Folio, a Philadelphia Federalist magazine. In 1818 shw wrote Conversations on the Bible, which became her most notable work.

In 1833, her essays and letters were compiled and published as Mrs. Sarah Hall, Author of Conversations on the Bible.

== Bibliography ==
- Conversations on the Bible (1818)
- Mrs. Sarah Hall, Author of Conversations on the Bible (1833)
