= The Port Folio =

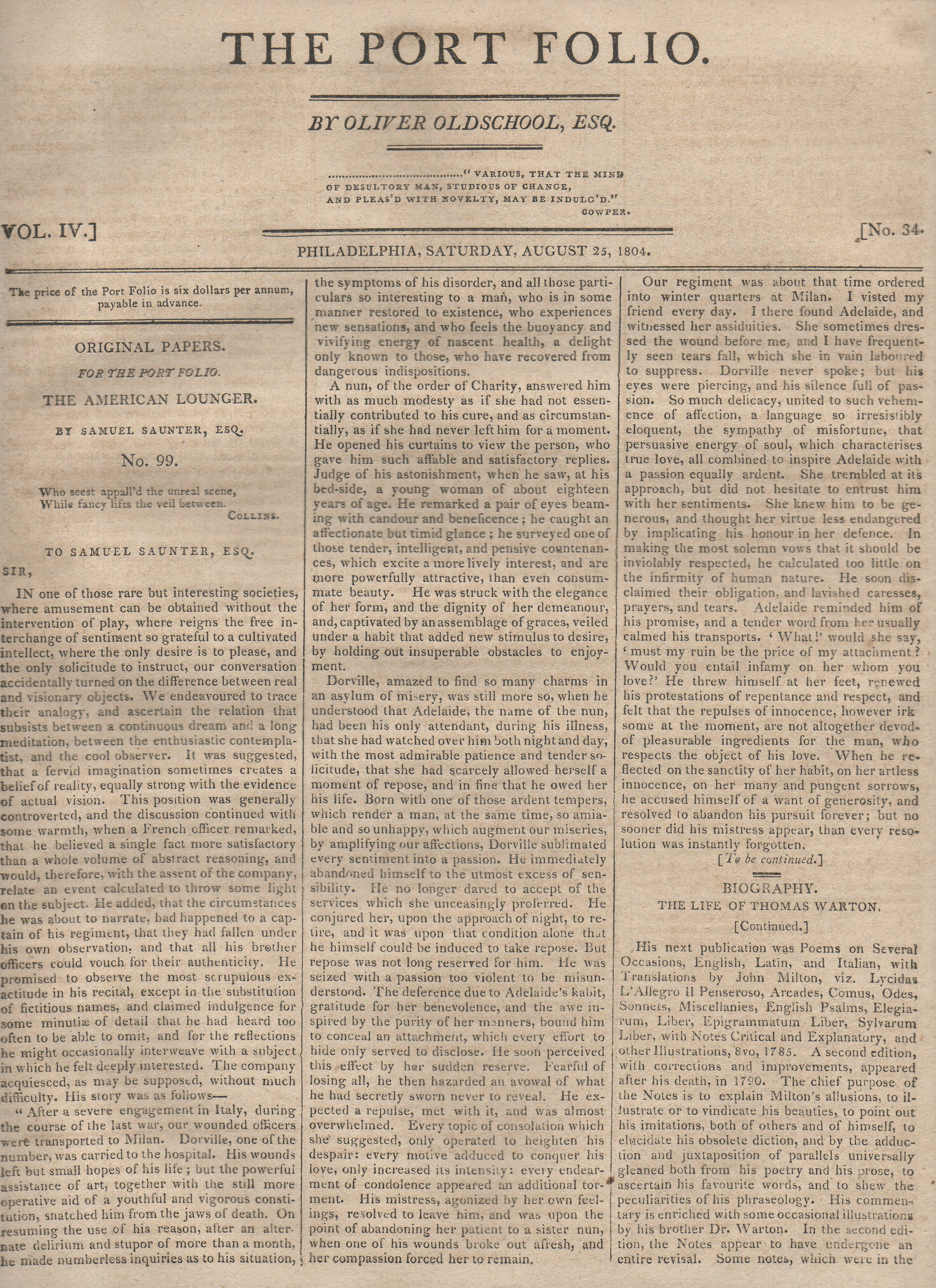
- Cover sheet of an 1804 issue
- Editor: Joseph Dennie
- Editor: Nicholas Biddle
- Editor: John Elihu Hall
- Categories: Politics and literature
- Frequency: Weekly
- Founded: 1800
- First issue: January 3, 1801
- Country: United States
- Based in: Philadelphia

The Port Folio was an American literary and political magazine that was published in Philadelphia, Pennsylvania from 1801 to 1827.

== History and notable features ==
The Port Folio was first co-published in 1801 by Joseph Dennie and Asbury Dickins. Dickins dropped as co-publisher, and Dennie remained the editor from 1802 to 1812. Dennie wrote under the pen name of Oliver Oldschool.

Many other contributors to the magazine wrote under pseudonyms, including members of the Federalist Party. Paul Allen (February 15, 1775 – August 18, 1826), a graduate of Brown University, was hired about 1800 as an editor.

In 1808, Dennie lost financial control to the publishers Bradford and Inskeep although he was kept on as editor at a salary. In 1809, the paper was re-organized as a monthly, and a new prospectus was issued that de-emphasized politics. In 1810, Dennie dropped the Oliver Oldschool pseudonym and wrote under his own name. Dennie died in 1812.

After Dennie's death, Nicholas Biddle, who was already a literary contributor and patron, became editor but only until 1814. Charles Jared Ingersoll, a nonpracticing lawyer, was also a contributor and patron.

From 1816 to 1827, the editor was John Elihu Hall. The paper had been floundering since Joseph Dennie died in 1812. John Hall, James Hall and Sarah Ewing Hall had all written works for The Port Folio under Dennie, and John Hall continued to rely heavily on James and Sarah while he was editor though John Neal was also a contributor early in that period. However, Hall was never able to resurrect the original reputation that the journal had, and it folded in 1827.
