= The Farmer's Weekly Museum =

Newspaper published in the United States

Front page of Monday October 29, 1798

The Farmer's Weekly Museum (1793–1810) was a newspaper published in New Hampshire. In addition to reprinting public documents and reports, it was a leading literary journal of the 1790s. Based in Walpole, New Hampshire, it was published from 1797 until 1799.

It was preceded by the New Hampshire and Vermont Journal. D. Carlisle was the publisher. Joseph Dennie served as the paper's editor from 1796 until 1798.

Oxford Reference dates it from 1793 until 1810, with contributors including founder Isaiah Thomas, Thomas Green Fessenden, John Davis, Joseph Dennie, and Royall Tyler.

Historian Alan F. Rumrill wrote about the paper and its history in 2024.
