= John Ewing (pastor) =

American pastor (1732–1802)

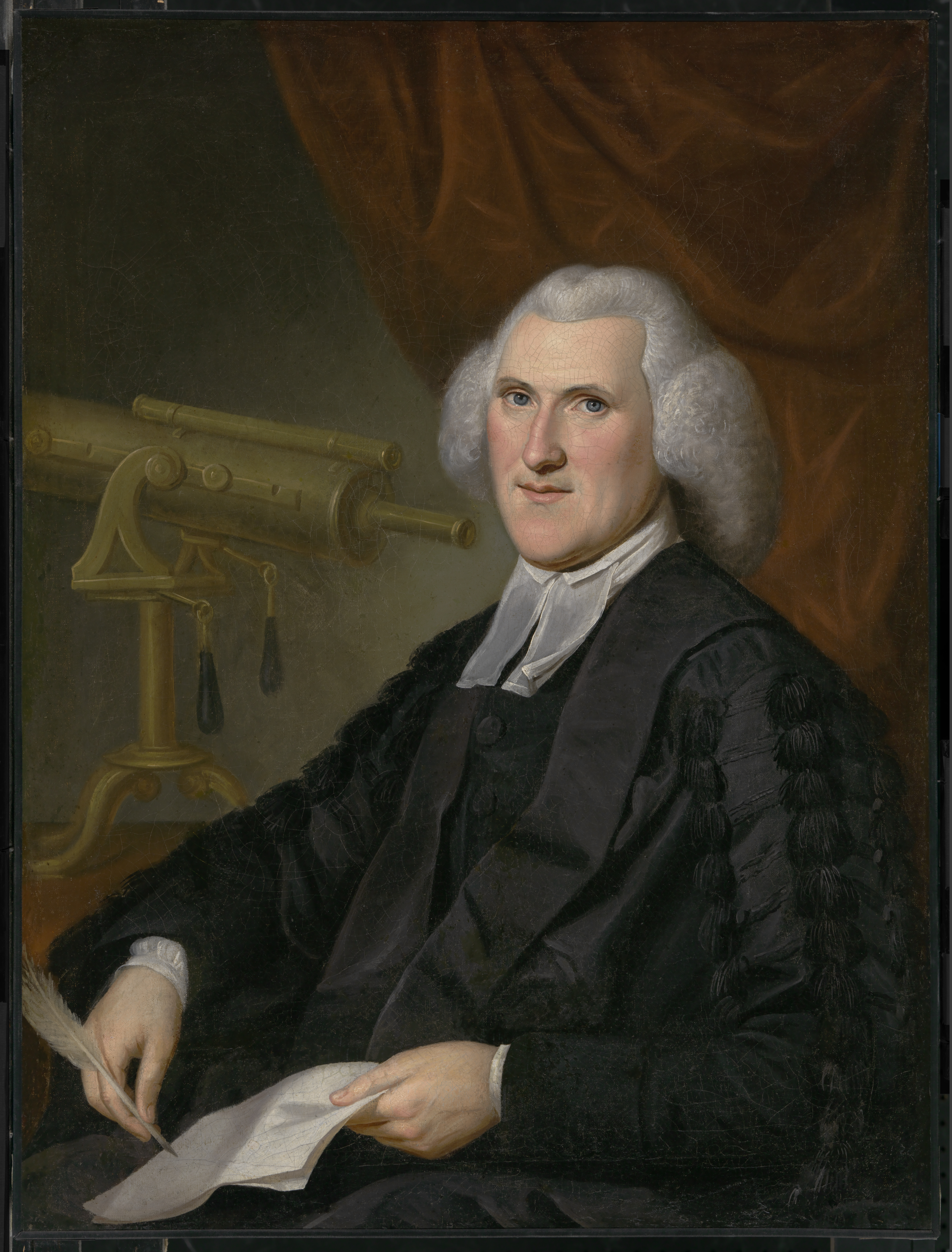
Portrait by Charles Willson Peale, 1788

John Ewing (1732–1802) was an American Presbyterian pastor of the First Presbyterian Church in Philadelphia from 1759 until his death in 1802 and served as the provost (president) of the University of Pennsylvania from 1780 to 1802. He also was a noted mathematician.

== Early life ==
Ewing and his twin brother, James, were born on June 22, 1732, in Cecil County, Province of Maryland. Their parents, Nathaniel Ewing and Rachel Porter, had emigrated to America several years earlier from Northern Ireland. Ewing married Hannah Sergeant in 1758, and they had 12 children.

Ewing was educated at a Pennsylvania prep school run by the Rev. Francis Alison, a respected classical scholar, and at the College of New Jersey (today's Princeton University), where he graduated with the class of 1754.

After working as a tutor at Alison's school, Ewing joined the faculty at the College of Philadelphia (today's University of Pennsylvania) in 1758 as a professor of ethics. He became a professor of natural philosophy in 1762.

== Clergy ==
In 1759, Ewing also became a pastor at the First Presbyterian Church, where Alison also had served as a pastor. Ewing's sermons were popular with the general churchgoers and educated elites, according to a Presbyterian historian. A selection of his sermons was published in 1812.

Ewing's senior role in the Presbyterian Church in Philadelphia earned him a position on the University of Pennsylvania's board of trustees from 1779 to 1802. He became the university's provost in 1780.

Ewing's scientific pursuits included observing the 1769 Transit of Venus from an observatory at the State House Yard and assisting with the routing of the boundary line for the state of Delaware and the path for the Philadelphia and Lancaster Turnpike. He joined the American Philosophical Society in 1768 and served as the treasurer of the Corporation for the Relief of Poor and Distressed Presbyterian Ministers, one of the earliest American life insurance companies.

Ewing traveled to Britain in 1773 to raise money for the Newark Academy in Delaware. During the trip, he was awarded an honorary doctor of divinity from the University of Edinburgh and met with a number of prominent Britons, including Lord North, who was the prime minister, and Dr. Samuel Johnson, the English writer.
