= Joseph Dennie =

American writer (1768–1812)

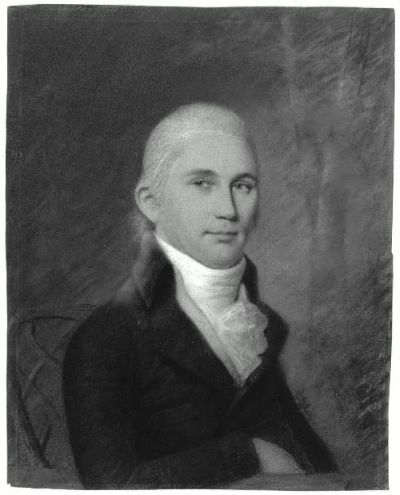
- Portrait of Joseph Dennie by James Sharples, c. 1790
- Born: Joseph Dennie; August 30, 1768; Boston, Province of Massachusetts Bay
- Died: January 7, 1812 (aged 43); Philadelphia, Pennsylvania, U.S.
- Other names: Oliver Oldschool; Academicus; Socialis
- Education: Harvard College
- Occupations: Author; journalist; editor; secretary
- Notable credit(s): The Lay Preacher; Port Folio

Joseph Dennie (August 30, 1768 – January 7, 1812) was an American author and journalist who was one of the foremost men of letters of the Federalist Era. A Federalist, Dennie is best remembered for his series of essays entitled The Lay Preacher and as the founding editor of The Port Folio, a journal espousing classical republican values. Port Folio was the most highly regarded and successful literary publication of its time, and the first important political and literary journal in the United States. Timothy Dwight IV once referred to Dennie as "the Addison of America" and "the father of American Belles-Lettres."

== Early life and career ==
Dennie was born on August 30, 1768, in Boston, Province of Massachusetts Bay, to Joseph Dennie, a member of a well-to-do merchant family, and his wife Mary Green, whose father was Bartholomew Green, Jr. The Greens were a prominent printing family in colonial America; the progenitor of the family, Samuel Green, emigrated from England with John Winthrop and was one of the first printers in the colonies. Having moved to Lexington at the age of seven, Dennie returned to Boston in 1783 to study bookkeeping and later clerk in a counting house. He began preparing to enter Harvard College in 1785, under the guidance of Reverend Samuel West. West had a significant impact on Dennie, fostering his pupil's interest in literature, as well as instilling in Dennie a decidedly pro-British mindset.

In 1787 Dennie was admitted to the sophomore class of Harvard College, where he was very popular with his peers. This popularity did not extend to his tutors, and he was suspended in December 1789 for six months after insulting the faculty. Dennie had difficulty finding suitable employment after earning his degree in 1790, but by 1793 he was practicing law (though earning very little for his work). In a January 1794 letter to his parents, however, Dennie reports that he had been appointed as a reader for the Episcopalian church in Charlestown, New Hampshire. Nevertheless, he insisted that this new vocation would not deter him from his goal of practicing law, though by then he was planning on remaining in New Hampshire to practice rather than returning to Massachusetts. Shortly after writing the letter, Dennie was admitted to the Court of Common Pleas and opened a practice in Charlestown. However, he rarely appeared in open court; indeed, he probably made only one appearance.

== Publishing career ==
Throughout the 1790s Dennie contributed to various journals, including the Federal Orrery and the Massachusetts Magazine, often using pen names such as Academicus and Socialis. In 1795, his writing being enthusiastically received, Dennie was persuaded to begin a literary journal, The Tablet. William Spotswood, a Boston printer and bookseller, agreed to oversee the entire enterprise, splitting the profits evenly with Dennie. Such a literary journal was a novel idea at the time, and it was well-received among the city's elite. Despite the initial excitement surrounding the project and content from noted writers such as John Sylvester John Gardiner, The Tablet lasted only a few months before folding, having published thirteen issues.

Dennie's disappointment over the failure of The Tablet inspired him to begin work on The Lay Preacher, the first of which appeared in The Farmer's Weekly Museum, a New Hampshire newspaper which was the leading literary journal of the 1790s. After Dennie took over as editor of the paper in 1796, its circulation increased dramatically, stretching, as one commentator put it, "from Maine to Georgia." Under Dennie's leadership the paper had a decidedly Federalist slant, supporting both the Quasi-War and the Alien and Sedition Acts. Dennie collaborated often with his friend Royall Tyler; the two wrote a satirical column by the name of "The Shop of Messrs. Colon and Spondee" which appeared in the Museum. In 1798 Dennie lost a considerable amount of money when the paper's printer went bankrupt. He remained as editor for a few months afterward at a reduced salary but was soon replaced by the printer's brother. The paper's circulation dropped precipitously following Dennie's departure. Later in the year Dennie ran an unsuccessful campaign for Congress; following this defeat, he turned down offers to edit several prominent journals, including a generous offer from Boston's Independent Chronicle, as he refused to work for a Democratic paper. Instead, he accepted an appointment from Timothy Pickering (at the time United States Secretary of State) to a position as Pickering's personal secretary.

Once in Philadelphia, Dennie resumed his editorial career with the Gazette of the United States, a Federalist-friendly newspaper. In 1800 Dennie, along with Philadelphia bookseller Asbury Dickens, began work on the Port Folio. Under the pseudonym Oliver Oldschool, Esq., Dennie wrote, in 1803, a scathing attack on Jeffersonian democracy, for which he was brought up on charges of seditious libel. Dennie wrote, in part:

A democracy is scarcely tolerable at any period of national history. Its omens are always sinister, and its powers are unpropitious. It is on its trial here, and the issue will be civil war, desolation, and anarchy. No wise man but discerns its imperfections, no good man but shudders at its miseries, no honest man but proclaims its fraud, and no brave man but draws his sword against its force. The institution of a scheme of policy so radically contemptible and vicious is a memorable example of what the villany of some men can devise, the folly of others receive, and both establish in spite of reason, reflection, and sensation.

This paragraph was reprinted in Federalist newspapers throughout the country. While Dennie was acquitted, the severity of the attacks leveled in Port Folio would henceforth be lessened. However, when Dennie criticized democracy, it was not the republican democracy found in the United States today, but rather the "democracy" found in France under Robespierre and Napoleon. Dennie was invoking Aristotle's argument that "an absolute democracy is not to be reckoned among the legitimate forms of government. It is the corruption and degeneracy, and not the sound constitution of a republic."

== Death ==
Dennie had health trouble throughout his life, as well as a predilection for wine. His father (who had battled mental illness) died on September 28, 1811; Dennie was not able to attend his father's funeral, as he himself was gravely ill at the time, and this caused him great grief. He briefly recovered, but succumbed to cholera morbus four months after his father's death. Dennie died on January 7, 1812, and was interred two days later at St. Peter's Church, Philadelphia. His epitaph was written by John Quincy Adams. The epitaph erroneously gives Lexington, Massachusetts, as his birthplace; in fact, Dennie was born in Boston, but his family moved to Lexington shortly thereafter.

== Works ==
- Dennie, Joseph; Pedder, Laura Green (2008). The Letters Of Joseph Dennie 1768–1812. Kessinger Publishing. ISBN 978-1-4366-9456-8.
- Dennie, Joseph; Hall, John E. (1817). The Lay Preacher. Philadelphia: Harrison Hall. OCLC 15458796. "The Lay Preacher."

== Sources ==
- Proceedings of the Massachusetts Historical Society. Massachusetts Historical Society. 1879.
- Adams, Henry; Harbert, Earl N. (1986). History of the United States of America During the Administrations of Thomas Jefferson. Library of America. ISBN 0-940450-34-8.
- Adams, Henry (2007). The Jeffersonian Transformation: Passages from the "History". New York Review of Books. ISBN 978-1-59017-215-5.
- Adams, Herbert Baxter (2006). The Life and Writings of Jared Sparks: Comprising Selections from His Journals and Correspondence. Kessinger Publishing. ISBN 1-4254-9328-9.
- Buckingham, William Tinker (1852). Specimens of Newspaper Literature: With Personal Memoirs, Anecdotes, and Reminiscences. Redding and Company.
- Clapp, William Warland (1880). Joseph Dennie: Editor of "The Port Folio," and author of "The Lay Preacher.". John Wilson and Son.
- Dowling, William C. (1999). Literary Federalism in the Age of Jefferson: Joseph Dennie and the Port Folio, 1801–1812. University of South Carolina Press. ISBN 1-57003-243-2. "Literary Federalism in the Age of Jefferson."
- Ellis, Harold Milton (1915). Joseph Dennie and His Circle: A Study in American Literature From 1792–1812. Bulletin of the University of Texas, No. 40. Studies in English No. 3 (July 15). Austin: University of Texas. i-viii. 9-285.Repr. N.Y.: AMS Press, 1971. ISBN 0-404-02308-8.
- Govan, Thomas P. (1951). "The Death of Joseph Dennie: A Memoir by Nicholas Biddle". Pennsylvania Magazine of History and Biography. 75 (1). Historical Society of Pennsylvania: 36–46.
- Hickey, Donald R. (1999). Lora, Ronald; Longton, William Henry (eds.). The Conservative Press in Eighteenth-and Nineteenth-century America. Greenwood Publishing Group. pp. 103–111. ISBN 0-313-31043-2.
- Horner, George and Robert, A. Bain. (1966). Colonial and Federalist American Writing. Odyssey Press.
- Marble, Annie Russell (1907). Heralds of American Literature: A Group of Patriot Writers of the Revolutionary and National Periods. University of Chicago Press. pp. 190–231. "Joseph Dennie."
- McKerns, Joseph P. (1989). Biographical Dictionary of American Journalism. Greenwood Press. pp. 178–180. ISBN 0-313-23818-9.
- O'Donnell Kaplan, Catherine (2008). Men of Letters in the Early Republic: Cultivating Forums of Citizenship. University of North Carolina Press. pp. 114–139. ISBN 978-0-8078-3164-9.
- Richards, Jeffrey H. (1997). Early American Drama. Penguin Classics. ISBN 0-14-043588-3.
- Simpson, Henry (1859). The Lives of Eminent Philadelphians, Now Deceased. W. Brotherhead. pp. 306–307. "Joseph Dennie Timothy Pickering."
- Sloane, David E.E. (April 14, 2016). "Dennie, Joseph". In Gale, Steven H. (ed.). Encyclopedia of American Humorists. Routledge. pp. 117–119. ISBN 978-1-317-36226-5.
- Smyth, Albert H. (1892). The Philadelphia Magazines and Their Contributors 1741–1850. Philadelphia: Robert M. Lindsay. pp. 90–117.
- Spiller, Robert Ernest (1948). Literary History of the United States. Macmillan Publishers.
- Thomas, Isaiah; Thomas, Benjamin Franklin (1874). The History of Printing in America: With a Biography of Printers, and an Account of Newspapers. J. Munsell.
- Trent, William Peterfield (1903). A History of American Literature, 1607–1865. D. Appleton & Company. p. 212. "Joseph Dennie Timothy Pickering."
- Tyler, Royall; Wilbur, James Benjamin (1920). The Contrast: A Comedy in Five Acts. Houghton Mifflin. "Joseph Dennie Royall Tyler."
- Ward, Julius H. (1896). The New England Magazine: An Illustrated Monthly. Warren F. Kellogg, Pinkham Press.
- Westbrook, Perry D. (1988). A Literary History of New England. Lehigh University Press. ISBN 0-934223-02-5. "A Literary History of New England."
