= The Basic School =

US Marine Corps school for new officers and warrant officers

Coordinates: 38°30′01″N 77°26′21″W

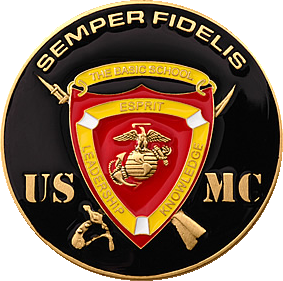
- The Basic School Insignia
- Country: United States
- Branch: USMC
- Type: Training
- Role: Train and educate newly commissioned or appointed United States Marine Corps Officers
- Part of: Training and Education Command
- Garrison/HQ: Camp Barrett, Virginia

Commanders
- Current commander: Colonel Charles E. Miller II
- Notable commanders: General James T. Conway; General John R. Allen

The Basic School is where all newly commissioned and appointed (for warrant officers) United States Marine Corps officers are taught the basics of being an "Officer of Marines." The Basic School is located in Stafford County, Virginia to the south-west of the Marine Corps Base Quantico complex. Each year, over 1,700 new officers are trained, representing such commissioning sources as the U.S. Naval Academy, Navy ROTC (Marine Option), Officer Candidates School, and newly appointed Marine Corps Warrant Officers, U.S. Merchant Marine Academy (Marine Option) accession programs.

== Courses conducted at TBS ==
=== Basic Officer Course (BOC) ===
==== Introduction and background ====
After earning a commission, new Marine Second Lieutenants (Unrestricted Line Officer Marine Lieutenants) complete the Basic Officer Course prior to beginning their job specialization (Military Occupational Specialty, or MOS) training to prepare them for service in the Marine Corps at large (Fleet Marine Force or other operating forces assignments). The majority of Marine Corps officers are commissioned through the USMC Officer Candidate School (OCS), but many are also graduates of the U.S. Naval Academy, or other service academies who choose to commission with the Marine Corps instead. Restricted Line/Limited Duty Officers are direct commissioned from the chief warrant officer ranks as either a first lieutenant or captain and do not attend BOC; however, as warrant officers, they have already completed the WOBC at TBS prior to beginning their officer service in the operating forces.

Most officers attend BOC as second lieutenants immediately after commissioning at OCS or within a few months of graduation and commissioning from either the USNA or an NROTC program. Some newly commissioned officers may serve a short period of time in an interim assignment (such as an assistant athletic coach at the USNA or attorney-intern at an installation) before beginning TBS/BOC. Some officers, particularly lawyers, attend BOC as first lieutenants because they were commissioned through the Platoon Leaders Class Law (PLC Law) program, which permits them to attend or continue law school after OCS as commissioned second lieutenants in the Marine Corps Reserve while they pursue their law degree. Often, those student judge advocates attain enough time in grade during law school as second lieutenants before matriculating at TBS/BOC to promote to first lieutenants. In very rare cases, an officer who receives an initial commission in another branch of the US armed forces, and who has already been promoted to first lieutenant, may receive an interservice transfer to the Marine Corps and attend TBS as a first lieutenant.

==== Course overview ====
The Officer Basic Course currently lasts 28 weeks, during which new officers receive classroom, field, and practical application training on weapons, tactics, leadership and protocol. The course is split into three graded categories:, Leadership, Academics, and Military Skills. Much like OCS, graded events are split between events that are graded and events that must be passed. Events that must be passed are the 15-mile hike, all three exams, the Endurance Course, Final Land Navigation, Night Land Navigation, and Rifle and Pistol Qualification. Events that simply earn a grade are the 3, 6, 9, and 12 mile hikes, leadership billets in field exercises, and various decision-making exercises.

Classroom events include topic specific lectures, exams, tactical decision games (TDGs), sand table exercises (STEXs), decision-forcing cases, and small group discussions. There are various field events, starting from fireteam and squad level, and progressing to platoon-reinforced and company-sized events. These field events involve realistic blank-fire training and live fire ranges.

===== Phases of instruction =====
- Phase I (7 Weeks): Individual Skills
  - Leadership
  - Rifle and Pistol Qualification
  - Land Navigation
  - Communications
  - Combat Lifesaving
  - MCMAP
- Phase II (6 Weeks): Rifle Squad Leader Skills
  - Decision-making
  - Combined Arms
  - Rifle Squad Tactics/Weapons
  - Scouting and Patrolling
- Phase III (6 Weeks): Rifle Platoon Commander Skills
  - Rifle Platoon Tactics
  - Convoy Operations
  - Engineering
  - Crew-served weapons
- Phase IV (7 Weeks): Basic MAGTF Officer Skills
  - Military Operations on Urbanized Terrain, or MOUT
  - Rifle Platoon (REIN) Tactics
  - Force Protection
  - Expeditionary Operations (AMFEX/"War")
  - Legal/Platoon Cmdr's Admin

==== MOS selection and post BOC training and assignments ====
Throughout the Program of Instruction (POI), Marines in each training company are split into thirds according to their combined scores of Leadership, Military Skills, and Academics. Each Marine ranks each specialization, or MOS, according to their preference, and each third is allocated an equal proportion of each specialization according to the Marine Corps' needs. Each third is independent of the others, so the top of the bottom third of placement is nearly as likely to get the specialization that they want as the top of the other two thirds. Throughout the POI, each Marine will have the opportunity to select which specialization they prefer in a mock-draft like setting, selecting what they prefer from what is leftover according to their grade placement in their third. Using these mock-drafts and listed preferences as reference, company staff then goes through each student and bestows upon them a specialization. This lottery system, however, does not apply to those Marines who signed air contracts to become pilots or law contracts to become Marine judge advocates.

After the Basic Officer Course, the officer will attend one or more schools to be trained in their specialty, and then be assigned to a unit in the Fleet Marine Force or other operating forces of the Marine Corps (e.g., Marine Barracks, Washington, DC, Marine Corps Chemical Biological Incident Response Force, Marine Corps Security Force Regiment, or the Marine Corps Embassy Security Group).

=== Warrant Officer Basic Course (WOBC) ===
Marine warrant officers attend a 16-week training regime similar in scope and instruction to the 28-week course required of second lieutenants, which is shortened due to the experience possessed by the newly appointed warrant officers. They are assigned to India Company at Camp Barrett.

An enlisted Marine may apply for the warrant officer program after serving at least eight years of enlisted service, and reaching the grade of E-5 (Sergeant) for the administrative warrant officer program. For the Marine Warrant Officer (Gunner) program, a Marine must have held the rank of Gunnery Sergeant for at least one year. Sergeants or Staff NCOs who are selected are given additional leadership and management training during the Warrant Officer Basic Course.

=== Infantry Officer Course (IOC) ===
Graduates of the BOC who are selected for an infantry MOS remain at TBS for the eleven-week Infantry Officer Course. This course was recently extended from twelve weeks to fifteen weeks before reducing to eleven weeks. During this program lieutenants receive intensive classroom instruction, practical experience, and field training in crew-served weapons, patrolling, and reconnaissance to ensure that they are MOS qualified for all of the infantry platoon commander billets, in addition to the rifle platoon, within a Marine infantry battalion. The other infantry billets are: rifle company weapons platoon (i.e., crew-served weapons) commander, as well as commander of one of the three heavy-weapons platoons (viz., 81mm mortar, antiarmor, and heavy machine gun) of the infantry battalion weapons company. Infantry officers may seek to compete for a tour as a reconnaissance platoon commander after serving an initial tour with an infantry unit.

Officers selected to serve in a Light Armored Reconnaissance (LAR) battalion complete an additional six-week LAR leaders course conducted at the USMC School of Infantry.

=== "Mike" Company ===
Marines who first arrive from OCS or the USNA, or who are unable to complete the BOC, WOBC, or IOC for either failing one of the three graded categories or are injured are sent to M Company, or "Mike Company." Marines in Mike Company provide support operations for companies that are actively training, as well as attend classes and physical events, until they can be given a new USMC MOS if they come from IOC, or resume training if they have yet to complete WOBC or BOC. Mike Company also has Marines who graduated from BOC but are awaiting MOS school pickup.

== See also ==
- United States Marine Corps Boot Camp
- Marine Corps Recruit Depot Parris Island
- Marine Corps Recruit Depot San Diego
