= Steven L. Emanuel =

- Born: 1950 (age 75–76)
- Education: Harvard Law School; Amherst College
- Occupations: Author, entrepreneur
- Employer: Wolters Kluwer
- Spouse: Marilyn Doreen Emanuel

Steven L. Emanuel is an American attorney who is an author of law school outlines and other law school study aids.

== Education and bar admissions ==
Emanuel is a graduate of Amherst College and Harvard Law School. He was admitted to the bar in the U.S. states of New York, Connecticut, Virginia, Maryland and Massachusetts.

== Outline business ==
Steven Emanuel started writing legal study aids to help fellow J.D. candidates while still a law student at Harvard in 1974.

Steven Emanuel's father, Lazar Emanuel, was himself a lawyer and law school advice author. Some time after Law School, Steven Emanuel founded Emanuel Publishing Corp. Under this umbrella organization he merged several series of study aids. These include CrunchTime, Law in a Flash, and Strategies & Tactics. His organization also eventually acquired the Siegel's series of law study aids. In 1995, Emanuel Publishing entered into an exclusive joint venture with Lexis-Nexis to make law outlines available online.

The entirety of Emanuel Publishing Corp. was sold to Aspen Publishing in 2001. Steven Emanuel is still responsible for spearheading all edits and revisions to the Emanuel study aids and is a lecturer in the Wolters Kluwer / Aspen publishing bar review course.

== Family ==
He is married to Marilyn Doreen Mandel Emanuel (since June 1976), and they have five children.
