= Juris Doctor =

Graduate-entry professional degree in law

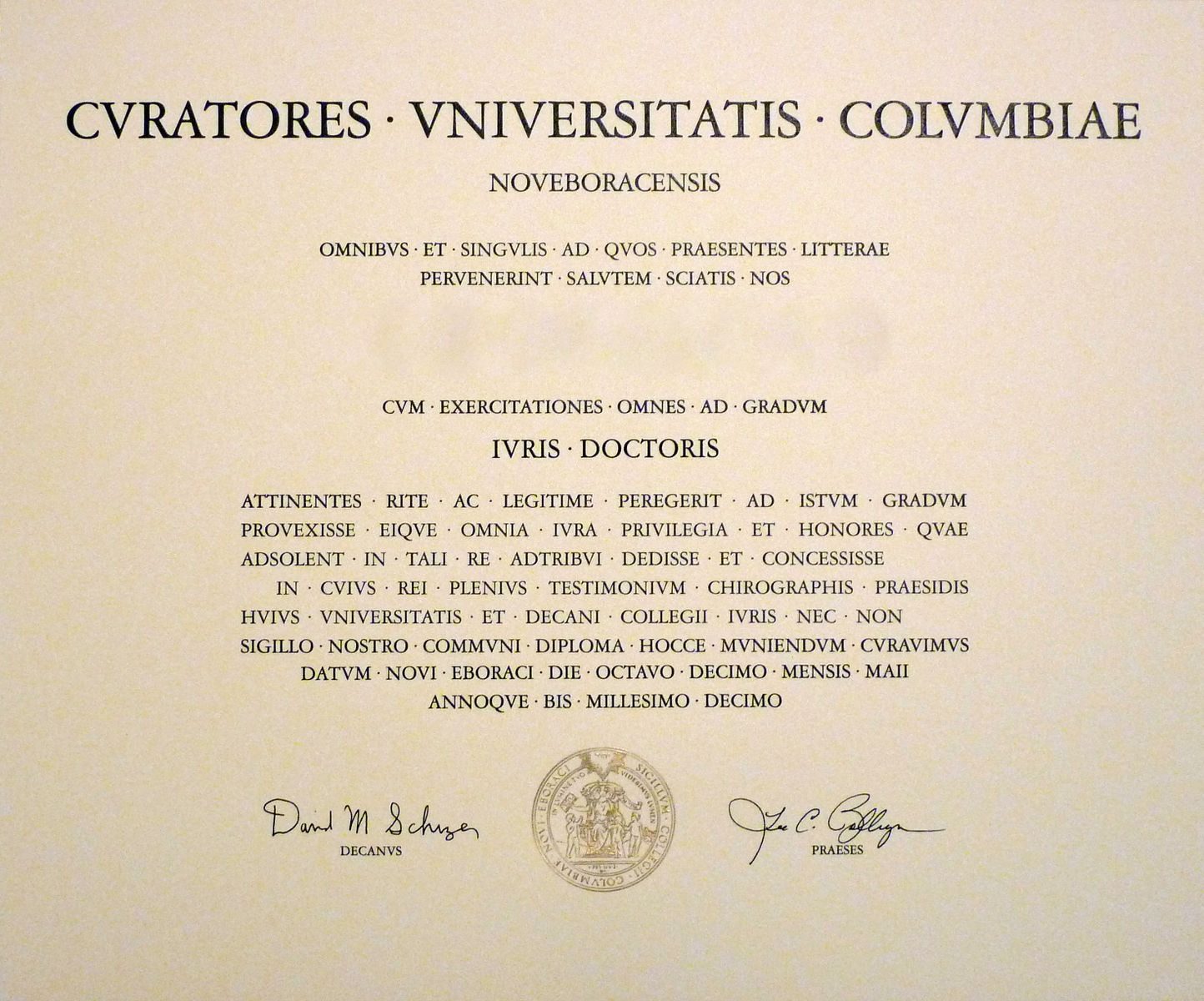
Juris Doctor diploma from Columbia Law School

A Juris Doctor, Doctor of Jurisprudence, or Doctor of Law (JD), is a graduate-entry professional degree that primarily prepares individuals to practice law. In the United States and the Philippines, it is the only qualifying law degree. Other jurisdictions, such as Australia, Canada, Hong Kong, and Japan, offer both the postgraduate JD degree as well as the undergraduate Bachelor of Laws, Bachelor of Civil Law, or other qualifying law degree.

First introduced by the University of Chicago Law School in the United States in 1902, the degree generally requires three years of full-time study to complete and is conferred upon students who have successfully completed coursework and practical training in legal studies. The JD curriculum typically includes fundamental legal subjects such as constitutional law, civil procedure, criminal law, contracts, property, and torts, along with opportunities for specialization in areas like international law, corporate law, or public policy. Upon receiving a JD, graduates must pass a bar examination to be licensed to practice law. The American Bar Association does not allow an accredited JD degree to be issued in less than two years of law school studies.

In the United States, the JD has the academic standing of a professional doctorate (in contrast to a research doctorate), and is described as a "doctor's degree – professional practice" by the United States Department of Education's National Center for Education Statistics. In Australia, South Korea, and Hong Kong, it has the academic standing of a master's degree, while in Canada it is considered a second-entry bachelor's degree.

To be fully authorized to practice law in the courts of a given state in the United States, the majority of individuals holding a JD degree must pass a bar examination, except from the state of Wisconsin. Some native american tribes, such as the Navajo Nation, permit tribal members to sit for a bar examination without holding a JD. The United States Patent and Trademark Office also involves a specialized "Patent Bar" which requires applicants to hold a bachelor's degree or the equivalent in certain scientific or engineering fields alongside their Juris Doctor degree in order to practice in patent cases – prosecuting patent applications – before it. This additional requirement does not apply to the litigation of patent-related matters in state and federal courts.

== Etymology and abbreviations ==
In the United States, the professional doctorate in law may be conferred in Latin or in English as Juris Doctor (sometimes shown on Latin diplomas in the accusative form Juris Doctorem) and at some law schools Doctor of Law (JD), or Doctor of Jurisprudence (also abbreviated JD). "Juris Doctor" literally means "teacher of law", while the Latin for "Doctor of Jurisprudence" (Jurisprudentiae Doctor) literally means "teacher of legal knowledge". The JSD and SJD are equivalent to PhD degrees in law, while the LLD may be equivalent to the PhD or may be a higher doctorate. The JD differs from the Doctor of the Science of Law (Juridicae Scientiae Doctor; JSD), Doctor of Juridical Science (Scientiae Juridicae Doctor; SJD), or Doctor of Laws (Legum Doctor; LLD). In the US, the JSD and SJD both require students to hold a JD and a Master of Laws (LLM); the JSD is for those wanting to pursue an academic career in the US, while the SJD is typically for students who are pursuing careers as professors of law at universities in other countries.

== Historical context ==
=== Origins of the law degree ===
The first university in Europe, the University of Bologna, was founded as a school of law by four famous legal scholars in the 11th century who were students of the glossator school in that city. This served as the model for other law schools of the Middle Ages, and other early universities such as the University of Padua. The first academic degrees may (Note: Some sources have the first doctorates in theology at Paris being awarded prior to the doctorates in law at Bologna.) have been doctorates in civil law (doctores legum) followed by canon law (doctores decretorum). These were not professional degrees but rather indicated that their holders had been approved to teach at the universities. While Bologna granted only doctorates, preparatory degrees (bachelor's and licences) were introduced in Paris and then in the English universities.

=== History of legal training in England ===
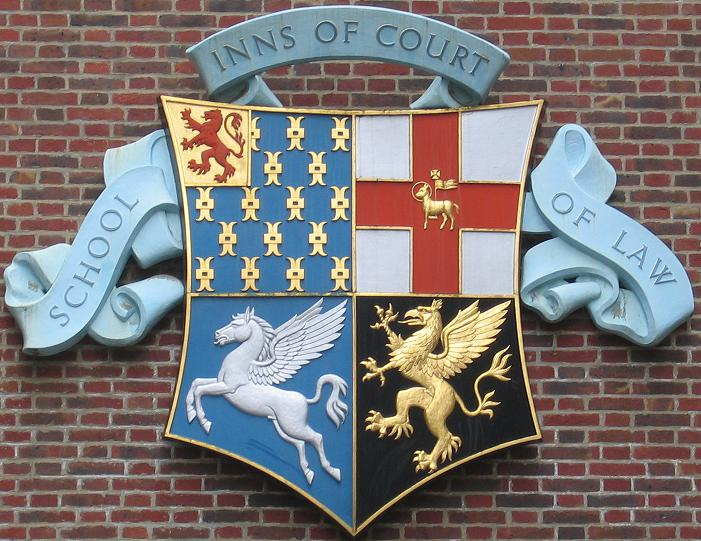
The Inns of Court of London served as a professional school for lawyers in England.

During the medieval period, the teaching of law at Cambridge and Oxford Universities was mainly for philosophical or scholarly purposes and not meant to prepare one to practice law. The universities only taught civil and canon law (used in very few jurisdictions, such as the courts of admiralty and church courts) but not the common law that applied in most jurisdictions. Professional training for practicing common law in England was undertaken at the Inns of Court, but over time the training functions of the Inns lessened considerably, and apprenticeships with individual practitioners arose as the prominent medium of preparation. However, because of the lack of standardization of study, and of objective standards for appraisal of these apprenticeships, the role of universities became subsequently important for the education of lawyers in the English-speaking world.

In England in 1292, when Edward I first requested that lawyers be trained, students merely sat in the courts and observed, but over time the students would hire professionals to lecture them in their residences, which led to the institution of the Inns of Court system. The original method of education at the Inns of Court was a mix of moot court-like practice and lecture, as well as court proceedings observation. By the fifteenth century, the Inns functioned like a university, akin to the University of Oxford and the University of Cambridge, though very specialized in purpose. With the frequent absence of parties to suits during the Crusades, the importance of the lawyer role grew tremendously, and the demand for lawyers grew.

Historically, Oxford and Cambridge did not see common law as worthy of academic study, and included coursework in law only in the context of canon and civil law (the two "laws" in the original Bachelor of Laws, which became the Bachelor of Civil Law when the study of canon law was barred after the Reformation) and for the purpose of the study of philosophy or history only. As a consequence of the need for practical education in law, the apprenticeship program for solicitors emerged, structured and governed by the same rules as the apprenticeship programs for the trades. The training of solicitors by a five-year apprenticeship was formally established by the Attorneys and Solicitors Act 1728. William Blackstone became the first lecturer in English common law at the University of Oxford in 1753, but the university did not establish the program for the purpose of professional study, and the lectures were philosophical and theoretical in nature. Blackstone insisted that the study of law should be university-based, where concentration on foundational principles can be had, instead of concentration on detail and procedure provided by apprenticeship and the Inns of Court.

The 1728 act was amended in 1821 to reduce the period of the required apprenticeship to three years for graduates from Oxford, Cambridge, and Dublin, as "the admission of such graduates should be facilitated, in consideration of the learning and abilities requisite for taking such degree". This was extended in 1837 to cover the newly established universities of Durham and London, and again in 1851 to include the new Queen's University of Ireland. The Inns of Court continued but became less effective, and admission to the bar still did not require any significant educational activity or examination. In 1846, Parliament examined the education and training of prospective barristers and found the system to be inferior to that of Europe and the United States, as Britain did not regulate the admission of barristers. Therefore, formal schools of law were called for but were not finally established until later in the century, and even then the bar did not consider a university degree in admission decisions.

Until the mid-19th century, most law degrees in England, for example the BCL at Oxford and Durham, and the LLB at London, were postgraduate degrees. The Cambridge degree was an exception: it took six years from matriculation to complete, but only three of these had to be in residence, and the BA was not required (although those not holding a BA had to produce a certificate to prove they had not only been in residence but had actually attended lectures for at least three terms). These degrees specialized in Roman civil law rather than in English common law, the latter being the domain of the Inns of Court, and thus they were more theoretical than practical. Cambridge re-established its LLB degree in 1858 as an undergraduate course alongside the BA, and the London LLB, which had previously required a minimum of one year after the BA, become an undergraduate degree in 1866. The older nomenclature continues to be used for the BCL at Oxford today, which is a master's level program, while Cambridge moved its LLB back to being a postgraduate degree in 1922 but only renamed it as the LLM in 1982.

Between the 1960s and the 1990s, law schools in England took on a more central role in the preparation of lawyers and consequently improved their coverage of advanced legal topics to become more professionally relevant. Over the same period, American law schools became more scholarly and less professionally oriented, so that in 1996 Langbein could write: "That contrast between English law schools as temples of scholarship and American law schools as training centers for the profession no longer bears the remotest relation to reality".

=== Legal training in colonial North America and 19th-century United States ===
Initially, there was much resistance to lawyers in colonial North America because of their role in hierarchical England, but slowly the colonial governments started using the services of professionals trained in the Inns of Court in London, and by the end of the American Revolution there was a functional bar in each state. Due to an initial distrust of a profession open only to the elite in England, as institutions for training developed in what would become the United States they emerged as quite different from those in England.

In the United States, the legal professionals were trained and imported from England. A formal apprenticeship or clerkship program was established first in New York in 1730 – at that time a seven-year clerkship was required, and in 1756 a four-year college degree was required in addition to five years of clerking and an examination. The requirements were later reduced to two years of college education. A system like the Inns did not develop, and a college education was not required in England until the 19th century, so this system was unique. The clerkship program required much individual study and the mentoring lawyer was expected to carefully select materials for study and guide the clerk in his study of the law and ensure that it was being absorbed. The student was supposed to compile notes of his reading of the law into a "commonplace book", which he would try to memorize. Although those were the ideals, in reality clerks were often overworked and rarely able to study the law individually as expected. They were often employed to tedious tasks, such as making handwritten copies of documents. Finding sufficient legal texts was also a seriously debilitating issue, and there was no standardization in the books assigned to the clerk trainees because they were assigned by their mentor, whose opinion of the law may have differed greatly from his peers.

It was said by one famous attorney in the United States, William Livingston, in 1745 in a New York newspaper that the clerkship program was severely flawed, and that most mentors "have no manner of concern for their clerk's future welfare ... [T]is a monstrous absurdity to suppose, that the law is to be learnt by a perpetual copying of precedents". There were some few mentors that were dedicated to the service, and because of their rarity, they became so sought-after that the first law schools evolved from the offices of some of these attorneys, who took on many clerks and began to spend more time training than practicing law.

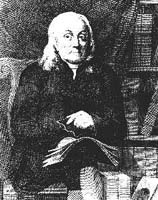
Tapping Reeve, founder of the first law school in North America, the Litchfield Law School, in 1773

In time, the apprenticeship program was not considered sufficient to produce lawyers fully capable of serving their clients' needs. The apprenticeship programs often employed the trainee with menial tasks, and while they were well trained in the day-to-day operations of a law office, they were generally unprepared practitioners or legal reasoners. The establishment of formal faculties of law in United States universities did not occur until the latter part of the 18th century. With the beginning of the American Revolution, the supply of lawyers from Britain ended. The first law degree granted by a United States university was a Bachelor of Law in 1793 by the College of William and Mary, which was abbreviated LB; Harvard was the first university to use the LLB abbreviation in the United States.

The first university law programs in the United States, such as that of the University of Maryland established in 1812, included much theoretical and philosophical study, including works such as the Bible, Cicero, Seneca, Aristotle, Adam Smith, Montesquieu and Grotius. It has been said that the early university law schools of the early 19th century seemed to be preparing students for careers as statesmen rather than as lawyers. At the LLB programs in the early 1900s at Stanford University and Yale continued to include "cultural study", which included courses in languages, mathematics and economics. An LLB, or a Bachelor of Laws, recognized that a prior bachelor's degree was not required to earn an LLB. In the 1850s, there were many proprietary schools which originated from a practitioner taking on multiple apprentices and establishing a school and which provided a practical legal education, as opposed to the one offered in the universities which offered an education in the theory, history and philosophy of law. The universities assumed that the acquisition of skills would happen in practice, while the proprietary schools concentrated on the practical skills during education.

==== Revolutionary approach: scientific study of law ====
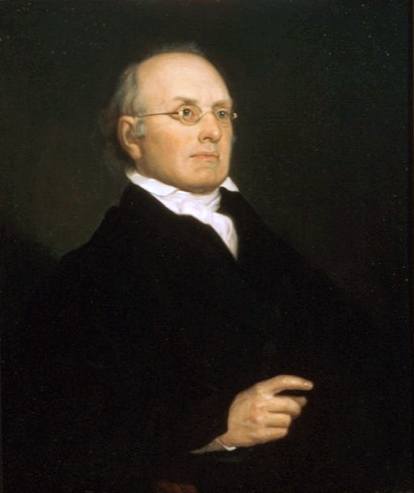
Joseph Story, United States Supreme Court Justice, lecturer of law at Harvard and proponent of the "scientific study of law"

In part to compete with the small professional law schools, there began a great change in United States university legal education. For a short time beginning in 1826 Yale began to offer a complete "practitioners' course" which lasted two years and included practical courses, such as pleading drafting. United States Supreme Court justice Joseph Story started the spirit of change in legal education at Harvard, when he advocated a more "scientific study" of the law in the 19th century. At the time, he was a lecturer at Harvard. Therefore, at Harvard the education was much of a trade school type of approach to legal education, contrary to the more liberal arts education advocated by Blackstone at Oxford and Jefferson at William and Mary. Nonetheless, there continued to be debate among educators over whether legal education should be more vocational, as at the private law schools, or through a rigorous scientific method, such as that developed by Story and Langdell. (Note: For detailed discussions of the development of C.C. Langdell's method, see la Piana (1994) and Stein (1981))

In the words of Dorsey Ellis, "Langdell viewed law as a science and the law library as the laboratory, with the cases providing the basis for learning those 'principles or doctrines' of which law, considered as a science, consists.'" Into the year 1900, most states did not require a university education (although an apprenticeship was often required) and most practitioners had not attended any law school or college. Therefore, the modern legal education system in the United States is a combination of teaching law as a science and a practical skill, implementing elements such as clinical training, which has become an essential part of legal education in the United States and in the JD program of study.

== Creation of the JD and major common law approaches to legal education ==
The JD originated in the United States during a movement to improve training of the professions. Prior to the origination of the JD, law students began law school either with only a high school diploma, or less than the amount of undergraduate study required to earn a bachelor's degree. The LLB persisted through the middle of the 20th century, which by then turned into a postgraduate degree requiring the previous completion of a bachelor's degree, thus becoming a bachelor's degree in name only.

=== Legal education in the United States ===
Professional doctorates were developed in the United States in the 19th century, the first being the Doctor of Medicine in 1807, but at the time, the legal system in the United States was still in development as the educational institutions were developing, and the status of the legal profession was at that time still ambiguous and so the professional law degree took more time to develop. Even when some universities offered training in law, they did not offer a degree. Because in the United States there were no Inns of Court, and the English academic degrees did not provide the necessary professional training, the models from England were inapplicable, and the degree program took some time to develop.

At first the degree took the form of a BL (such as at the College of William and Mary), but then Harvard, keen on importing legitimacy through the trappings of Oxford and Cambridge, implemented an LLB degree. The decision to award a bachelor's degree for law could be due to the fact that admittance to most 19th-century American law schools required only satisfactory completion of high school. The degree was nevertheless somewhat controversial at the time because it was a professional training without any of the cultural or classical studies required of a degree in England, where it was necessary to gain a general BA prior to an LLB or BCL until the 19th century. Thus, even though the name of the English LLB degree was implemented at Harvard, the program in the United States was nonetheless intended as a first degree which, unlike the English BA, gave practical or professional training in law.

==== Creation of the Juris Doctor ====
In the mid-19th century there was much concern about the quality of legal education in the United States. C. C. Langdell served as dean of Harvard Law School from 1870 to 1895, and dedicated his life to reforming legal education in the United States. The historian Robert Stevens wrote that "it was Langdell's goal to turn the legal profession into a university educated one – and not at the undergraduate level, but through a three-year post baccalaureate degree." This graduate level study would allow the intensive legal training that Langdell had developed, known as the case method (a method of studying landmark cases) and the Socratic method (a method of examining students on the reasoning of the court in the cases studied). Therefore, a graduate, high-level law degree was proposed: the Juris Doctor, implementing the case and Socratic methods as its didactic approach.

According to professor J. H. Beale, an 1882 Harvard Law graduate, one of the main arguments for the change was uniformity. Harvard's four professional schools – theology, law, medicine, and arts and sciences – were all graduate schools, and their degrees were therefore a second degree. Two of them conferred a doctorate and the other two a baccalaureate degree. The change from LLB to JD was intended to end "this discrimination, the practice of conferring what is normally a first degree upon persons who have already their primary degree". The JD was proposed as the equivalent of the German JUD, to reflect the advanced study required to be an effective lawyer. The University of Chicago Law School was the first to offer the JD in 1902, when it was just one of five law schools that demanded a college degree from its applicants. While approval was still pending at Harvard, the degree was introduced at many other law schools, including at the law schools at NYU, Berkeley, Michigan, and Stanford. Because of tradition, and concerns about less prominent universities implementing a JD program, prominent eastern law schools like those of Harvard, Yale, and Columbia refused to implement the degree. Harvard, for example, refused to adopt the JD degree, even though it restricted admission to students with college degrees in 1909. Indeed, pressure from eastern law schools led almost every law school (except at the University of Chicago and other law schools in Illinois) to abandon the JD and re‑adopt the LLB as the first law degree by the 1930s. By 1962, the JD degree was rarely seen outside the Midwest.

After the 1930s, the LLB and the JD degrees co‑existed in some American law schools. Some law schools, especially in Illinois and the Midwest, awarded both (like Marquette University, beginning in 1926), conferring JD degrees only to those with a bachelor's degree (as opposed to two or three years of college before law school), and those who met a higher academic standard in undergraduate studies, finishing a thesis in their third year of law school. Because the JD degree was no more advantageous for bar admissions or for employment, the vast majority of Marquette students preferred to seek the LLB degree. As more law students entered law schools with previously awarded bachelor's degrees in the 1950s and 1960s, a number of law schools may have introduced the JD to encourage law students to complete their undergraduate degrees. As late as 1961, there were still 15 ABA-accredited law schools in the United States which awarded both LLB and JD degrees. Thirteen of the 15 were located in the Midwest, which may indicate regional variations in the United States.

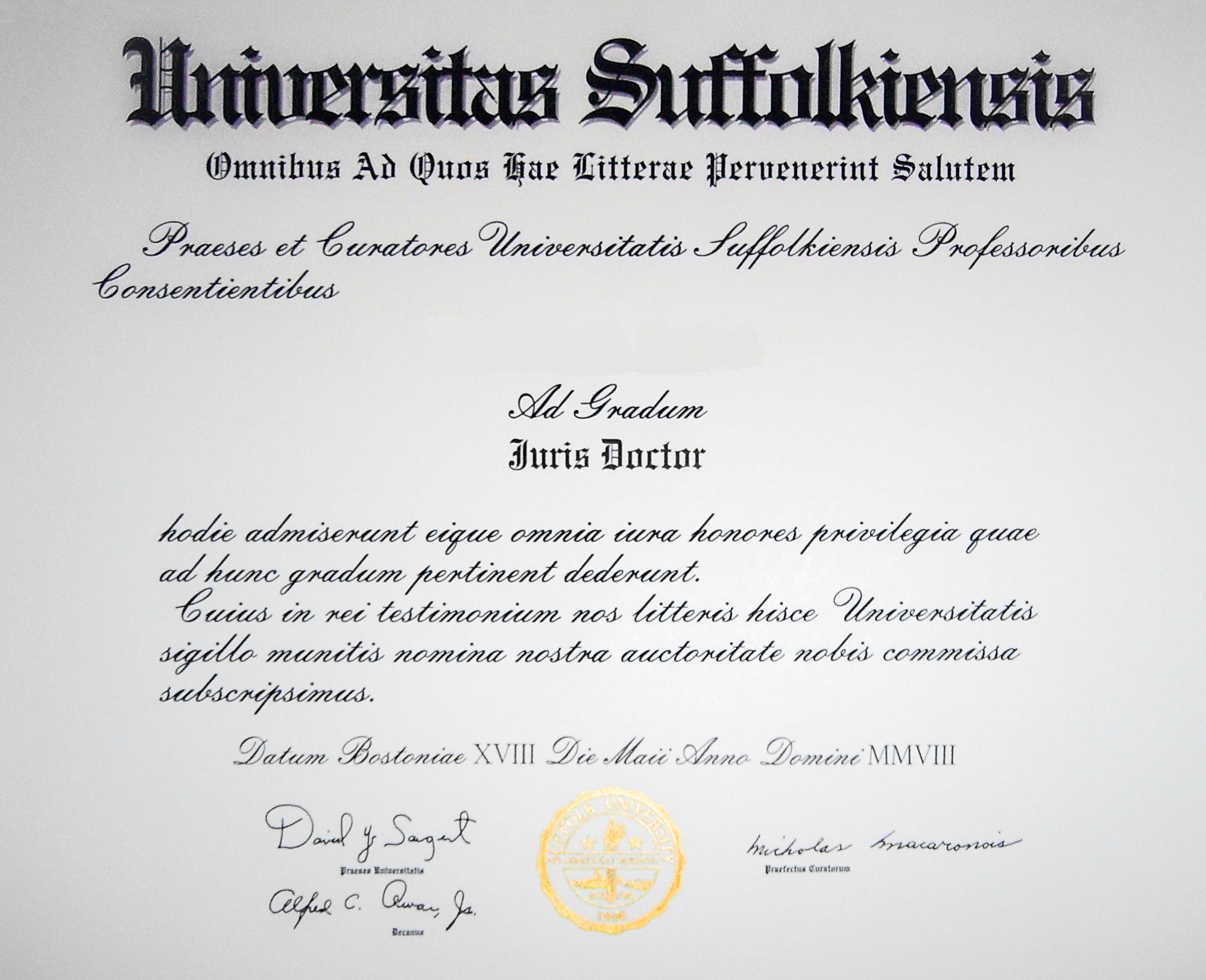
A Juris Doctor conferred by Suffolk Law School

It was only after 1962 that a new push – this time begun at less-prominent law schools – successfully led to the universal adoption of the JD as the first law degree. The turning point appears to have occurred when the ABA Section of Legal Education and Admissions to the Bar unanimously adopted a resolution recommending to all approved law schools that they give favorable consideration to the conferring of the JD degree as the first professional degree, in 1962 and 1963. By the 1960s, most law students were college graduates having previously obtained a bachelor's degree, and by the end of that decade, almost all were required to be. Student and alumni support were key in the LLB-to-JD change, and even the most prominent schools were convinced to make the change: Columbia and Harvard in 1969, and Yale (last) in 1971. Nonetheless, the LLB at Yale retained the didactical changes of the "practitioners' courses" of 1826, and was very different from the LLB in common law countries, other than Canada.

Following standard modern academic practice, Harvard Law School refers to its Master of Laws and Doctor of Juridical Science degrees as its graduate level law degrees. Similarly, Columbia refers to the LLM and the JSD as its graduate program. Yale Law School lists its LLM, MSL, JSD, and PhD as constituting graduate programs. A distinction thus remains between professional and graduate law degrees at some universities in the United States.

=== Major common law approaches ===
The English legal system is the root of the systems of other common-law countries, such as the United States. Originally, common lawyers in England were trained exclusively in the Inns of Court. Even though it took nearly 150 years since common law education began with Blackstone at Oxford for university education to be part of legal training in England and Wales, the LLB eventually became the degree usually taken before becoming a lawyer. In England and Wales the LLB is an undergraduate program and although it (assuming it is a qualifying law degree) fulfills the academic requirements for becoming a lawyer, further vocational and professional training as either a barrister (the Bar Professional Training Course followed by pupillage) or as a solicitor (the Legal Practice Course followed by a "period of recognised training") is required before becoming licensed in that jurisdiction. The qualifying law degree in most English universities is the LLB although in some, including Oxford and Cambridge, it is the BA in law. A few universities offer "exempting" degrees, usually integrated master's degrees denominated Master in Law (MLaw), that combine the qualifying law degree with the legal practice course or the bar professional training course in a four-year, undergraduate-entry program.

Legal education in Canada has unique variations from other Commonwealth countries. Even though the legal system of Canada is mostly a transplant of the English system (Quebec excepted), the Canadian system is unique in that there are no Inns of Court, the practical training occurs in the office of a barrister and solicitor with law society membership, and, since 1889, a university degree has been a prerequisite to initiating an articling clerkship. The education in law schools in Canada was similar to that in the United States at the turn of the 20th century, but with a greater concentration on statutory drafting and interpretation, and elements of a liberal education. The bar associations in Canada were influenced by the changes at Harvard, and were sometimes quicker to nationally implement the changes proposed in the United States, such as requiring previous college education before studying law.

== Modern variants and curricula ==
Legal education is rooted in the history and structure of the legal system of the jurisdiction where the education is given; therefore, law degrees are vastly different from country to country, making comparisons among degrees problematic. This has proven true in the context of the various forms of the JD which have been implemented around the world.

Comparisons of JD variants (Note: Citations for verification of the data in this table can be found in the subsequent paragraphs of this section.)
Jurisdiction	Duration (years)	Different curriculum from LL.B. in jurisdiction	Further vocational training required for license
Australia	3	No	Yes
Canada	3	No	Yes
Hong Kong	2–3	No	Yes
Italy	5	Integrated	Yes
Japan	2–3	Yes	Yes
Philippines	4	Varies	No (Note: Juris Doctor degree qualifies one to sit for the bar examinations.)
Singapore	3	No	Yes
United States	3	No	No, except Delaware

=== Types and characteristics ===
==== Standard Juris Doctor curriculum ====
As stated by Hall and Langdell, who were involved in the creation of the JD, the JD is a professional degree like the MD, intended to prepare practitioners through a scientific approach of analysing and teaching the law through logic and adversarial analysis (such as the casebook and Socratic methods). This system of curriculum has existed in the United States for over 100 years. The JD program generally requires a bachelor's degree for entry, though this requirement is sometimes waived. As a study of the substantive law and its professional applications, the JD curriculum has not changed substantially since its creation. As a professional degree, JD programs typically allow practitioners. It requires at least three academic years of full-time study. While the JD is a doctoral degree in the US, lawyers usually use the suffix "Esq." as opposed to the prefix "Dr.", and that only in a professional context, when needed to alert others that they are a biased party – acting as an agent for their client.

==== Replacement for the LLB ====
An initial attempt to rename the LLB to the JD in the US in the early 20th century started with a petition at Harvard in 1902. This was rejected, but the idea took hold at the new law school established at the University of Chicago and other universities. By 1925, 80% of US law schools awarded the JD to students who had entered the program with an undergraduate degree, while granting undergraduate entrants the LLB. The change was initially rejected by the leading law schools of the time Harvard, Yale and Columbia. By the late 1920s, schools were moving away from the JD and once again granting only the LLB, with only law schools in Illinois holding out. This changed in the 1960s, by which time almost all law school entrants were graduates. The JD was reintroduced in 1962 and by 1971 had replaced the LLB, with many schools offering a JD as a replacement to their LLB alumni. Canadian and Australian universities have had graduate-entry law programs that are very similar to the JD programs in the United States, but typically called the LLB. Some students at these universities advocated for the renaming of the graduate-entry LLB to the JD to recognise the graduate characteristics of the program and to obtain a so-called doctoral-level qualification.

=== Descriptions of the JD outside the United States ===
==== Australia ====
The traditional law degree in Australia is the undergraduate Bachelor of Laws (LLB). Beginning in the 2010s, many Australian universities now offer JD programs, including the country's best ranked universities (e.g. the University of New South Wales, the University of Sydney, the Australian National University, the University of Melbourne, Monash University,, Western Sydney University, and the University of Western Australia). Generally, universities that offer the JD also offer the LLB, although at some universities, only the graduate-entry JD is offered. The University of Melbourne, for example, has phased out its undergraduate LLB program for a graduate JD one.

An Australian Juris Doctor consists of three years of full-time study, or the equivalent. The course varies across different universities, though all are obliged to teach the Priestley 11 subjects per the requirements of state admissions boards in Australia. JDs are considered equivalent to LLBs, and graduates must meet the same requirements to qualify, including undergoing a practical training. On the Australian Qualifications Framework, the Juris Doctor is classified as a "masters degree (extended)", with an exception having been granted to use the term "doctor" in the title (other such exceptions include Doctor of Medicine, Doctor of Dentistry and Doctor of Veterinary Medicine). It may not be described as a doctoral degree and holders may not use the title "doctor".

==== Canada ====
The JD degree is the dominant common-law law degree in Canada, having replaced many of the nation's former LLB programs. Unlike other jurisdictions, the Canadian LLB was historically typically second-entry undergraduate degree that required the prior completion of another undergraduate degree. The University of Toronto became the first law school to rename its law degree in 2001. As with the second-entry LLB, to be admitted to a Juris Doctor program, applicants must complete a minimum of two or three years of study toward a bachelor's degree and score well on the North American Law School Admission Test. Notwithstanding the formal requirements, nearly all successful applicants complete undergraduate degrees before admission to a JD program. The JD in Canada is considered to be a bachelor's degree qualification.

All Canadian Juris Doctor programs consist of three years and have similar content in their mandatory first year courses, including public law, property law, tort law, contract law, criminal law and legal research and writing. Beyond first year and other courses required for graduation, course selection is elective with various concentrations such as commercial and corporate law, taxation, international law, natural resources law, real estate transactions, employment law, criminal law and Aboriginal law. After graduation from an accredited law school, each province's or territory's law society requires completion of a bar admission course or examination and a period of supervised articling prior to independent practice.

United States jurisdictions other than New York and Massachusetts do not recognize Canadian Juris Doctor degrees automatically. Likewise, United States JD graduates are not automatically recognized in Canadian jurisdictions such as Ontario. To prepare graduates to practise in jurisdictions on both sides of the border, some pairs of law schools have developed joint Canadian-American JD programs. As of 2018, these include a three-year program conducted concurrently at the University of Windsor and the University of Detroit Mercy, as well as a four-year program with the University of Ottawa and either Michigan State University or American University in which students spend two years studying on each side of the border. Previously, New York University (NYU) Law School and Osgoode Hall Law School offered a similar program, but this has since been terminated.

Two notable exceptions are Université de Montréal and Université de Sherbrooke, which both offer a one-year JD program aimed at Quebec civil law graduates in order to practice law either elsewhere in Canada or in the state of New York. York University offered the degree of Doctor of Jurisprudence (DJur) as a research degree until 2002, when the name of the program was changed to PhD in law.

==== China ====
The primary law degree in China is the undergraduate Bachelor of Laws. The Juris Magister is the graduate-level professional law degree in China, which is regarded as the counterpart of a Juris Doctor. In fall 2008, the Shenzhen graduate campus of Peking University started the School of Transnational Law, which offers a United States-style education and awards a Chinese Juris Doctor degree.

===== Hong Kong =====
The JD degree is currently offered at the Chinese University of Hong Kong, The University of Hong Kong, and City University of Hong Kong. The JD in Hong Kong is almost identical to the LLB, and is reserved for graduates of non-law disciplines. However, the JD requires a thesis or dissertation. The JD in Hong Kong is a two-year program, including study during the summer term, but can be extended to three years with summer vacations. The JD is considered a master's degree by universities and the Hong Kong Qualification Framework. Neither the LLB nor the JD provides the education sufficient for a license to practice. Graduates of both are also required to undertake the PCLL course and a solicitor traineeship or barrister pupillage.

==== Italy ====
In Italy, only one program gives access to traditional legal professions such as lawyer, magistrate or public notary, and that is the Laurea Magistrale in Giurisprudenza. Legal studies have a long history in Italy, with the University of Bologna being the main Italian center for studies of both canon law and civil law in the 12th and 13th centuries. The Laurea Magistrale in Giurisprudenza is a five-year academic program, deemed a master's-level degree under the Bologna process, that can be entered into with a high school diploma. The program comprises universities classes in legal theory and legal subjects, excluding practical courses, and is concluded with a thesis (Italian: tesi di laurea) to be defended before an academic commission. In a novel approach, a few universities are trialing a 3+2 model, which initially offers a bachelor's degree in law, followed by the option to undertake an additional two years to earn the Italian Juris Doctor.

Italian graduates in law are awarded the title of Doctor of Law (Italian: Dottore Magistrale in Giurisprudenza, commonly known as Dottore in legge), in keeping with standard Italian practice of awarding the title of doctor to university graduates. Holders of the Laurea Magistrale in Giurisprudenza are eligible to register with an Italian bar association, which is a prerequisite for the mandatory eighteen-month apprenticeship under a practicing attorney-at-law before taking the bar examination. Alternatively, graduates may opt for two additional years of study at the Scuole di Specializzazione per le Professioni Legali (Specialization Schools for the Legal Profession), leading to a Diploma di Specializzazione per le Professioni Legali (Specialization Diploma for the Legal Profession), akin to a master's degree. Possession of the Laurea Magistrale in Giurisprudenza also qualifies individuals to partake in the competitive public examination, administered by the Ministry of Justice, for entry into the ordinary magistracy.

==== Japan ====
In Japan the JD is known as Homu Hakushi (法務博士, hōmu hakushi). The program generally lasts three years. Two-year JD programs for applicants with legal knowledge (mainly undergraduate level law degree holders) are also offered. This curriculum is professionally oriented, but does not provide the education sufficient for a license to practice as an attorney in Japan. All candidates for licensing must undertake a 12-month practical training by the Legal Training and Research Institute after passing the bar examination. Similarly to the United States, the Juris Doctor is classed as a professional degree (専門職, senmonshoku) in Japan, which is separate from the academic class of postgraduate master's degrees and doctorates.

==== Philippines ====
In the Philippines, the Juris Doctor (JD) has replaced the LLB as the universal academic degree for law graduates. This transition was formalized by the Legal Education Board (LEB) through Legal Education Board Memorandum Order No. 19, s. 2018, which mandated the adoption of the JD as the standard law degree in the country.

The JD program spans four years and includes all subjects required for the Philippine Bar Examination. In 2021, the LEB issued Legal Education Board Memorandum Order No. 24, s. 2021, which adopted a Revised Model Law Curriculum (RMLC) to standardize legal education across all institutions. In 2024, the LEB introduced the Master of Legal Studies-Juris Doctor (MLS-JD) program, which allowed students with an MLS degree to complete a JD in a shorter period.

In 2019, the LEB issued Legal Education Board Resolution No. 2019-406, declaring that basic law degrees, whether LLB or JD, should be considered equivalent to doctoral degrees in other non-law disciplines for purposes of appointment, employment, ranking, and compensation. However, the Commission on Higher Education, which has legal responsibility for establishing equivalency, stated that it had serious concerns with this declaration and has ruled that JDs are not equivalent to doctorates.

==== Singapore ====
The degree of Doctor of Jurisprudence is offered at all three law schools in Singapore, which also offer LLB degrees. It is a qualifying law degree for the purposes of admission to the legal profession in Singapore. A graduate of these programmes is a "qualified person" under Singapore's legislation governing entry to the legal profession, and is eligible for admission to the Singapore Bar.

==== United Kingdom ====
The Quality Assurance Agency consulted in 2014 on the inclusion of "Juris Doctor" in the U.K. Framework for Higher Education Qualifications as an exception to the rule that "doctor" should only be used by doctoral degrees. It was proposed that the Juris Doctor would be an award at bachelor level, and would not confer the right to use the title "doctor". This was not incorporated into the final framework published in 2014.

The only JD degree awarded by a UK university is at Queen's University Belfast. The 3–4 year degree is specified a professional doctorate at the doctoral qualifications level, sitting above the LLM. It includes a 30,000-word dissertation. Joint LLB/JD courses for a small number of students are offered by University College London, King's College London, and the London School of Economics in collaboration with Columbia University. King's also offers a joint LLB/JD with Georgetown University. King's College London and the University of Exeter offer joint LLB/JD degrees with the Chinese University of Hong Kong, with two years in the UK followed by two years in Hong Kong.

Harvard Law School and the University of Cambridge offer a JD/LLM Joint Degree Program enabling Harvard JD candidates to earn a Cambridge LLM and a Harvard JD in 3.5 years. The University of Southampton offers a two-year graduate-entry LLB described as a "JD pathway" degree. The University of Surrey previously offered a course similar to Southampton's. The University of York offers a three-year so-called "LLM Law (Juris Doctor)" degree.

== In academia ==
In the United States, the Juris Doctor is the degree that prepares the recipient to enter the law profession (as do the MD or DO in the medical profession and the DDS or DMD in the dental profession). While the JD is the sole degree necessary to become a professor of law or to obtain a license to practice law, it (like the MD, DO, DDS, or DMD) is not a research degree. Research degrees in the study of law include the Master of Laws (LLM), which ordinarily requires the JD as a prerequisite, and the Doctor of Juridical Science (SJD/JSD), which ordinarily requires the LLM as a prerequisite. the American Bar Association, which accredits US law schools, has issued a Council Statement stating:

WHEREAS, the acquisition of a Doctor of Jurisprudence degree requires from 84 to 90 semester hours of post baccalaureate study and the Doctor of Philosophy degree usually requires 60 semester hours of post baccalaureate study along with the writing of a dissertation, the two degrees shall be considered as equivalent degrees for educational employment purposes.

Accordingly, while most law professors are required to conduct original writing and research in order to be awarded tenure, the majority have a JD as their highest degree and are qualified to teach and supervise LLM and JSD candidates. However, research in 2015 showed an increasing trend toward hiring professors with both a JD and PhD in a field that confers PhD degrees, particularly at more highly ranked schools. Professor Kenneth K. Mwenda criticized the council's statement, pointing out that it compares the JD only to the taught component of the PhD degree in the United States, ignoring the research and dissertation components.

The United States Department of Education Center for Education Statistics classifies the JD and other professional doctorates as "doctor's degree-professional practice". It classifies the PhD and other research doctorates as "doctor's degree-research/scholarship". Among legal degrees, it accords the latter status only to the Doctor of Juridical Science degree. In Europe, the European Research Council follows a similar policy, stating that a professional degree carrying the title "doctor" is not considered equivalent to a research degree, such as a PhD. The Dutch and Portuguese National Academic Recognition Information Centres both classify the JD granted in the United States (along with other professional doctorate degrees) as equivalent to a master's degree, while the National Qualifications Authority of Ireland states with respect to United States practice that: "The '1st professional degree' is a first degree, not a graduate degree, even though it incorporates the word 'doctor' in the title". Commonwealth countries also often consider the JD granted in the United States equivalent to a bachelor's degree, even though the United States Citizenship and Immigration Services has advised that "while neither degree is likely equivalent to a PhD, a JD, or MD degree would be considered to be equivalent to, if not higher than, a masters degree".

== Use of the title "doctor" ==
Since at least the 1920s, it has been contrary to custom in the United States to address holders of the JD as "doctor". In the late 1960s, the rising number of American law schools awarding JDs led to debate over whether lawyers could ethically use the title "doctor". Initial informal ethics opinions, based on the Canons of Professional Ethics then in force, came down against this. These were then reinforced with an ABA ethics opinion that maintained the ban on using the title in legal practice (except when dealing with countries where the use of "doctor" by lawyers was standard practice) but allowed the use of the title in academia "if the school of graduation thinks of the JD degree as a doctor's degree". The opinion generated much debate.

The introduction of the 1969 Code of Professional Responsibility settled the question in favor of allowing the use of the title in states where the code was adopted. There was some dispute over whether only the PhD-level Doctor of Juridical Science grant the title, but ethics opinions have read the Code as allowing JD-holders to be called 'doctor', while acknowledging that the older Canons did not. As not all state bars adopted the new code, and some omitted the clause permitting the use of the title, confusion over whether lawyers could ethically use the title "doctor" continued. While many state bars now allow the use of the title, some prohibit its use where there is any chance of confusing the public about a lawyer's actual qualifications (e.g. if the public might believe the lawyer is a doctor of medicine). There has been discussion on whether it is permissible in some other limited instances. For example, in June 2006, the Florida Bar Board of Governors ruled that a lawyer could refer to himself as a "doctor en leyes" (doctor in laws) in a Spanish-language advertisement, reversing an earlier decision. The decision was reversed again the following month, when the board voted to only allow the use of untranslated names of degrees.

The Wall Street Journal notes specifically in its stylebook that "Lawyers, despite their JD degrees, aren't called doctor." Many other newspapers reserve the title for physicians only, or do not use titles at all. In 2011, Mother Jones published an article claiming that Michele Bachmann was misrepresenting her qualifications by using the "bogus" title "Dr." based on her JD. They later amended the article to note that use of the title by lawyers "is a (begrudgingly) accepted practice in some states and not in others", although they maintained it was rarely used as it "suggests that you're a medical doctor or a Ph.D. – and therefore conveys a false level of expertise."

== See also ==
- Accelerated JD program
- Admission to practice law
- Bachelor of Civil Law (BCL)
- Bachelor of Laws (LLB)
- Doctor of Canon Law (JCD)
- Doctor of Juridical Science (JSD or SJD)
- Doctor of Laws (LLD)
- Law degree
- Law school in the United States – describes general characteristics of the J.D. curriculum in the United States
- Lawyer
- Legal education
- Master of Laws (LLM)
