= University of Silicon Valley Law School =

Coordinates: 37°01′15″N 121°31′04″W

- Established: 2003
- School type: Private law school
- Dean: Sherry Ross
- Location: Fremont, CA, US
- Bar pass rate: 0% (0/1) (July 2013 1st time takers)
- Website: http://www.usvlaw.com/

The University of Silicon Valley Law School (USVLS) (also named The University of Silicon Valley School of Law on its logo) was an unaccredited law school registered with the California Committee of Bar Examiners as a private law school with offices located in Fremont, California. The school's website said it offered a part-time, four-year law program in which all classes were taken in the evenings in Fremont, California.

== Registration ==
It used the name Silicon Valley University Law School in its registration with the California Committee of Bar Examiners (Note: The name "Silicon Valley University Law School" has been registered in the past as a Fictitious Business Name with the Santa Clara County Clerk-Recorder—See: Certificate Number: 423315, Filing Date: March 4, 2003; Filing Type: F – Fictitious Business Name; Expiration Date: March 4, 2008; Proof of Publication on File: Yes; Business Name(s): Silicon Valley University Law School; Owner Name(s): Sherry V Ross) of the State Bar of California as an unaccredited law school. It is not approved by the American Bar Association. As such, students from USVLS must take and pass the First-Year Law Students' Examination, also known as the "Baby Bar", at the end of their first year in order to receive credit for their first year law study and eventually qualify to sit for the California Bar Examination.
