= Decision game =

A decision game is an exercise in which a teacher presents students with a scenario, asks them to take on the role of a character in that scenario, and then asks them to solve problems as if they were that character. If the scenario is based entirely upon a reliable historical narrative, a decision game is also a decision-forcing case. However, if any of the elements in the scenario are fictional, then the exercise is a fictional decision game.

== History ==
Until the late twentieth century, most decision games dealt with problems drawn from the realm of tactics. The exceptions to this general rule, moreover, were incidental rather than deliberate. That is, while authors of decision-forcing cases in such disciplines as business management and public policy would sometimes fictionalize their cases (thereby converting them into fictional decision games), these works were invariably (if erroneously) described as "case studies". Because of this, the history of the decision game was, until recently, very hard to distinguish from the history of the tactical decision game.

Since the 1990s, decision games dealing with matters other than military tactics have made their appearance. Some of these exercises deal with situations, such as those faced by police officers, fire fighters, and first responders, that have so much in common with tactical military problems that they are accurately described as "tactical decision games". In other instances, the problems are so different from those faced by military tacticians that the use of the term "tactical decision games" would be misleading.

== Elements of a decision game ==
A decision game has two indispensable elements:

1. The presentation of the problem to participants.
2. The discussion of solutions.

In most instances, however, the instructor will add a third element, which is the presentation of a "wrap up" solution to the problem. If the decision game is fictional, this would be his own solution to the problem. If the decision game is a decision-forcing case, then the solution would be the decision made by the protagonist of the case, followed by the immediate results of that decision.

== Types of decision games ==
The taxonomy of decision games is based upon two attributes. The first of these, whether the game is historical (real) or fictional (imaginary), is a binary attribute. That is, a decision game can either be real or imaginary, but it cannot be both. The second attribute, which is the art to which the problem at the heart of the game belongs, is open ended. That is, there is no inherent limit to the number of arts for which decision games can be created. Moreover, a given decision game can deal with a problem that belongs to more than one art. Thus, for example, a decision game designed for police officers may deal with both ethics and tactics.

Common types of decision games include:

- business decision games
- ethical decision games
- firefighting decision games
- leadership decision games
- logistical decision games
- operational decision games
- police decision games
- strategic decision games
- tactical decision games
