= The Case Centre =

Independent home of the case method

- Formation: 1973
- Headquarters: Cranfield, Bedford, United Kingdom
- Key people: Vicky Lester (Director)
- Website: thecasecentre.org
- Formerly called: Case Clearing House of Great Britain and Ireland (1973-1991); The European Case Clearing House (1991-2005); ECCH (2005-2013)

The Case Centre is a United Kingdom not-for-profit organization that was established in 1973. It's the independent home of the case method and includes more than 500 member organisations worldwide.

Headquartered at Cranfield University, The Case Centre is the world’s largest repository of case studies used in teaching management subjects and allied disciplines. Its stated aim is to promote the case method by sharing knowledge, skills, and expertise in this area among teachers and students.

== History ==
The Case Centre is a not-for-profit organisation and registered charity founded in 1973 as the Case Clearing House of Great Britain and Ireland. It is the independent home of the case method. It was founded as Case Clearing House of Great Britain and Ireland, as a collaborative initiative of 22 higher educational institutions that wanted a platform to share case materials between management educators.

As the initiative grew in Europe, the organization rebranded itself as The European Case Clearing House in 1991, and again rebranded itself to ECCH in 2005 to reflect its global presence, and finally rebranded to The Case Centre in 2013 to reflect its preeminent position in case method. It currently includes more than 500 member organisations worldwide.

Headquartered at Cranfield University, The Case Centre is the world’s largest repository of case studies that are used in teaching management subjects and allied disciplines. Its stated aim is to promote the case method by sharing knowledge, skills, and expertise in this area among teachers and students.

== Journal ==
In 2019, The Case Centre launched the Case Focus, a journal for peer-reviewed teaching cases, focused on the Middle East and Africa region.

== Case Centre Awards ==
In order to promote the case method, The Case Centre recognises outstanding case writers and teachers worldwide through The Case Centre Awards (known as the European Awards between 1991 and 2010).
