= Law school in the United States =

School offering post-graduate education in law

A law school in the United States is an educational institution where students obtain a professional education in law after first obtaining an undergraduate degree.

Law schools in the U.S. confer the degree of Juris Doctor (J.D.), which is a professional doctorate. It is the degree usually required to practice law in the United States, and the final degree obtained by most practitioners in the field. Juris Doctor programs at law schools are usually three-year programs if done full-time, or four-year programs if done via evening classes. Some U.S. law schools include an Accelerated JD program.

Other degrees that are awarded include the Master of Laws (LL.M.) and the Doctor of Juridical Science (J.S.D. or S.J.D.) degrees, which can be more international in scope. Most law schools are colleges, schools or other units within a larger post-secondary institution, such as a university. Legal education is very different in the United States than in many other parts of the world.

== Terminology ==
A 2006 study found that the names of the 192 law schools approved by the American Bar Association (ABA) at that time included one of five generic identifiers: "school of law" (118), "college of law" (38), "law school" (28), "law center" (7), and "faculty of law" (1). However, in ordinary speech, "law school" is universally preferred for its "brevity and clarity".

== Admission ==
In the United States, American Bar Assocation (ABA) law schools require a bachelor's degree in any discipline, a satisfactory undergraduate record, and a satisfactory score on the Law School Admission Test (LSAT) or another standardized test (such as the Graduate Record Examinations (GRE) or JD-Next) as prerequisites for admission.

California, which has the most non-ABA-approved, state-accredited schools has the requirement of 60 credits toward a bachelor's degree.

Globally, the requirement of a bachelor's degree is one of the most distinctive features of the American law school. Elsewhere, it is routine to award law degrees to undergraduates. In contrast, a typical American lawyer must first complete seven years of postsecondary education before they become eligible for a license to practice law. Another significant distinction is that, unlike many other countries where law professors usually hold research doctorates, most American law professors have earned only the same J.D. degree which will be awarded to the students they are teaching.

Though undergraduate GPA and LSAT score are the most important factors considered by law school admissions committees, individual factors are also somewhat important. Personal factors are evaluated through essays, short-answer questions, letters of recommendation, and other application materials. The standards for grades and LSAT scores vary by school. Interviews—either in person or via video chat—may be optional, or invitational, application components. Many law schools actively seek applicants from outside the traditional pool to boost racial, economic, and experiential diversity on campus. Most law schools now factor in extracurricular activities, work experience, and unique courses of study in their evaluation of applicants. A growing number of law school applicants have several years of work experience, and correspondingly fewer law students enter immediately after completing their undergraduate education. However, law schools generally only consider undergraduate and not post-collegiate transcripts when considering an applicant for admission; the former are considered by law schools to be a more uniform standard than the latter for judging academic performance.

Many law schools offer substantial scholarships and grants to many of their students, dramatically reducing the actual cost of attending law school compared to listed tuition prices. Some law schools condition scholarships on maintaining a certain GPA.

As of 2013, there were 128,641 students enrolled in JD programs at the 204 approved ABA law schools. A decade later, in 2023, J.D. programs enrolled 116,897 students at the 196 institutions then approved by the ABA. Since 2016, women enrolled in American law schools have outnumbered men. In 2024, 56.09 percent of JD students enrolled at ABA-accredited schools were women.

== Accreditation ==
To sit for the bar exam, the vast majority of state bar associations require accreditation of an applicant's law school by the American Bar Association. The ABA has promulgated detailed requirements covering every aspect of a law school, down to the precise contents of the law library and the minimum number of minutes of instruction required to receive a J.D. As of 2026, there were 198 ABA-accredited law schools that awarded the J.D. The Judge Advocate General's Legal Center and School in Charlottesville, Virginia, a school operated by the United States Army that conducts a post-J.D. program for military attorneys and offers the LLM, is also ABA-accredited.

=== Non-ABA law schools ===
In addition, individual state legislatures or bar examiners may maintain a separate approval system, which is open to non-ABA accredited schools. The State Bar of California is the most well-know example and maintains a separate approval system which is open to non-ABA accredited schools. As of 2026, 21 law schools are approved by the State Bar of California. This allows them to take the bar exam in California and once they have passed that exam, a large number of states allow those students to sit for their bars (after practicing for a certain number of years in California). The other states that have non-ABA accredited law schools are Alabama, Massachusetts, and Tennessee.

Non-ABA approved law schools have much lower bar passage rates than ABA-approved law schools, and do not submit or disclose employment outcome data to the ABA.

=== Unaccredited schools ===
Some schools are not accredited by a state or the American Bar Association. As of 2026, there are 8 of these unaccedited law schools, all located in California. Their first year students are required to take the First-Year Law Students' Examination (FYLSE), also known as the ("baby bar"), which then authorizes continuing their legal studies. Graduates of non-ABA accredited schools may then take the California Bar Examination. After passing the Bar, they are then licensed to practice law in California. Many other jurisdictions do not allow graduates of unaccredited law schools to sit for their state bar examination. In California, graduates of non-ABA approved law schools have much lower bar passage rates than same-race graduates of ABA-approved law schools in the same state.

== Fields of study ==
Law students may concentrate on a specific area of law after completing the first year, though law schools vary in terms of which fields they may offer as specializations. Standard fields include:

- Administrative law
- Admiralty law (maritime)
- Commercial law
- Corporate law
- Criminal law
- Entertainment law
- Environmental law
- Family law
- Health law (health care) and Public health law
- Immigration law
- Information technology law
- Insurance law
- International law and International human rights law
- Intellectual property law
- Labour law
- Patent law
- Property law
- Public interest law
- Sports law
- Tax law

== Curriculum ==
Law students are referred to as 1Ls, 2Ls, and 3Ls based on their year of study. In the United States, the American Bar Association does not mandate a particular curriculum for 1Ls. ABA Standard 302(a)(1) requires only the study of "substantive law" that will lead to "effective and responsible participation in the legal profession." However, most law schools have their own mandatory curriculum for 1Ls, which typically includes:

- Civil procedure (Federal Rules of Civil Procedure)
- Constitutional law (United States Constitution, especially Fifth and Fourteenth Amendments, and the Commerce Clause)
- Contracts (Article 2 (Sales) of the Uniform Commercial Code and Restatement (Second) of Contracts)
- Criminal law (General common law, Model Penal Code, and state criminal statutes)
- Property (General common law and Restatement of Property)
- Torts (General common law, Restatement (Second) and Restatement (Third) of Torts)
- Legal research (Use of a law library and computer-assisted legal research, including both LexisNexis and Westlaw)
- Legal writing (including objective analysis, persuasive analysis, and legal citation)

These basic courses are intended to provide an overview of the broad study of law. Not all ABA-approved law schools offer all of these courses in the 1L year; for example, many schools do not offer constitutional law and/or criminal law until the second and third years. Most schools also require Evidence but rarely offer the course to first-year students. Some schools combine legal research and legal writing into a single year-long "lawyering skills" course, which may also include a small oral argument component.

Because the first year curriculum is always fixed, most schools do not allow 1L students to select their own course schedules, and instead hand them their schedules at new student orientation.

At most schools, the grade for an entire course depends upon the outcome of only one or two examinations, usually in essay form, which are administered via students' laptop computers in the classroom with the assistance of specialized software. Some professors may use multiple choice exams in part or in full if the course material is suitable for it (e.g., professional responsibility). Legal research and writing courses tend to have several major projects (some graded, some not) and a final exam in essay form. Most schools impose a mandatory grade curve (see below).

The ABA also requires that all students at ABA-approved schools take an ethics course in professional responsibility. Typically, this is an upper-level course; most students take it in the 2L year. This requirement was added after the Watergate scandal, which seriously damaged the public image of the profession because President Richard Nixon and most of his alleged co-conspirators were lawyers. The ABA desired to demonstrate that the legal profession could regulate itself, wished to reassert and maintain its position of leadership, and hoped to prevent direct federal regulation of the profession.

As of 2004, to ensure that students' research and writing skills do not deteriorate, the ABA has added an upper division writing requirement. Law students must take at least one course, or complete an independent study project, as a 2L or 3L that requires the writing of a paper for credit.

Most law courses are less about doctrine and more about learning how to analyze legal problems, read cases, distill facts and apply law to facts.

In 1968, the Ford Foundation began disbursing $6 million to persuade law schools to make "law school clinics" part of their curriculum. Clinics were intended to give practical experience in law practice while providing pro bono representation to the poor. However, conservative critics charge that the clinics have been used instead as an avenue for the professors to engage in left-wing political activism. Critics cite the financial involvement of the Ford Foundation as the turning point when such clinics began to change from giving practical experience to engaging in advocacy.

Law schools that offer accelerated JD programs have unique curricula for such programs. Nonetheless, ABA-approved law schools with Accelerated JD programs must meet ABA rules.

Finally, the emphasis in law schools is rarely on the law of the particular state in which the law school sits, but on the law generally throughout the country. Although this makes studying for the bar exam more difficult since one must learn state-specific law, the emphasis on legal skills over legal knowledge can benefit law students not intending to practice in the same state they attend law school.

== Grades, grading, and GPA curves ==
Grades in law school are very competitive. Most schools grade on a curve. In most law schools, the first year curve (1L) is considerably lower than courses taken after the first year of law school.

Many schools use a "median" grading system, that can range from "B-plus medians" to "C-minus medians". Some professors are obliged to determine which exam or paper was the exact median in terms of quality (e.g., the 26th best out of 51), give that paper the relevant grade depending on the system used, and then grade the other exams based on how much better or worse they are than the median. A few schools, such as Yale Law School, Stanford Law School, Harvard Law School, University of California, Berkeley School of Law, and Northeastern University School of Law have alternate grading systems that put less emphasis (or no emphasis) on rank. Other schools, such as New York's Fordham Law School, use a forced grading distribution, where a predetermined percentage of students must receive certain grades. For instance, such a system could oblige professors to award a minimum and maximum number of "A's" and "F's" (e.g., 3.5%/7% A's and 4.5%/10% F's). Many professors chafe against the lack of discretion provided by such systems, especially the required failing of a certain number of students whose performance may have been sub-par but not, in the professor's estimation, worthy of a failing grade. The "median" system seeks to provide some parity among teachers' grading scales while giving the teacher discretion to award a grade below the median only when deserved.

Fairness and equity are the primary reasons for required curves and required grade distributions. Some faculty tend to give higher grades and others lower grades, with a mandatory curve balancing both extremes. Also, at law schools with multiple sections of the same class, it minimizes the problem that one section will have an unfair advantage over another section when applying for Law Review or Moot Court.

Even with curved grading, some law schools such as Syracuse University College of Law still have a policy of "Dismissal for Academic Deficiency", in which students failing to meet a minimum GPA are dismissed from the school.

One school that has deviated from the system of competitive grading common to most American law schools is Northeastern University School of Law. Northeastern does not have any system of grade point averages or class rank, Instead, the school uses a system of narrative evaluations to measure student performance.

A system of anonymous grading known as blind grading is used in many law schools in the United States. It is intended to counter bias by the grader. Each semester students are assigned random numbers, usually by the Registrar's Office, which students must include on their exams. Professors then grade the exams on an anonymous basis, only discovering student names after grades have been submitted to the Registrar's Office. General adoption of blind grading followed admission of significant numbers of minority students to law schools.

== Accelerated JD programs ==
An Accelerated JD program may refer to one of the following:

- A program that combines a bachelor's degree with a juris doctor degree ("3+3 JD program" or "BA to JD program").
- A two-year juris doctor degree that is offered in a condensed period, separately from a bachelor's degree ("2-year JD program").

As a result of student concerns about the time and cost (both in terms of tuition and the opportunity cost associated with foregoing a salary for three years) required to complete a law degree, there has been an emerging trend to develop accelerated JD programs.

== Pedagogical methods ==
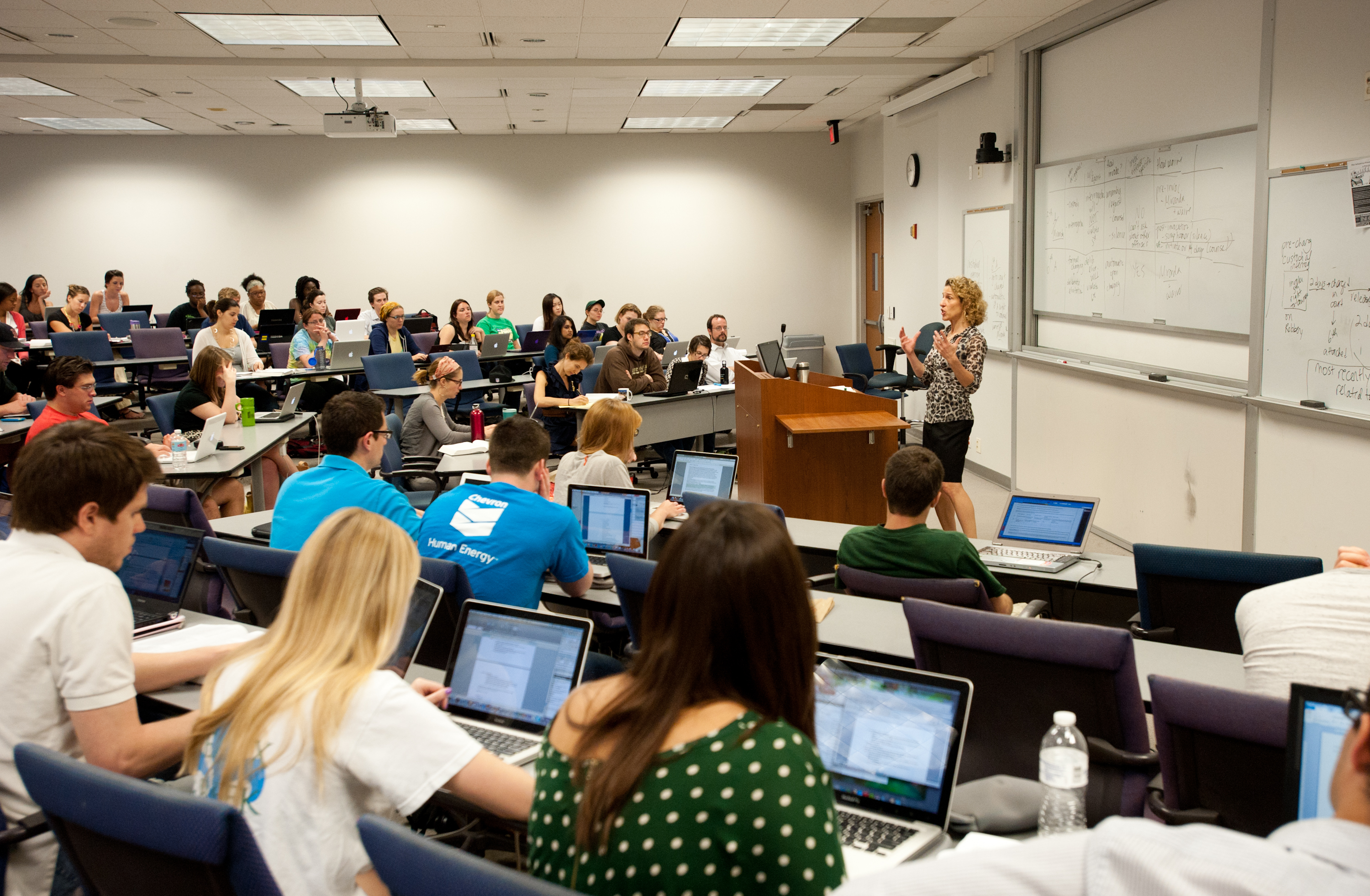
2012 in Tulane University

Most law school education in the United States is traditionally based on an approach developed by Christopher Columbus Langdell and James Barr Ames at Harvard Law School during the 1870s. Professors lead in-class debates over the issues in selected court cases, compiled into "casebooks" for each course. Under the Harvard approach, law professors do not deliver lengthy lectures and instead use the Socratic method to force students to teach one another, based on their individual understanding of legal theory and the facts of the case at hand.

Many law schools continue to use the Socratic method—consisting of calling on a student at random, asking about an argument made in an assigned case, asking the student whether they agree with the argument, and then using a series of questions to carefully expose logical flaws in the student's analysis of the argument. Examinations usually entail interpreting the facts of a hypothetical case, determining how legal theories apply to the case, and then writing an essay. This process is intended to train students in the reasoning methods necessary to interpret theories, statutes, and precedents correctly, and argue their validity, both orally and in writing. In contrast, most civil law countries base their legal education on professorial lectures and oral examinations, which are more suited for the mastery of complicated civil codes.

This style of teaching is often disorienting to first-year law students who are more accustomed to taking notes from professors' lectures.. Most casebooks do not clearly outline the law; instead, they force the student to interpret the cases and derive the basic legal concepts from the cases themselves. As a result, many publishers market law school outlines that concisely summarize the basic concepts of each area of law, and good outlines are highly sought after by many students, although some professors discourage their use.

Legal pedagogy has also been criticized by scholars like Alan Watson in his book, The Shame of Legal Education. Some law schools, such as Savannah Law School, have changed direction and created collaborative learning environments to allow students to work directly with each other and professors in order to model the teamwork of attorneys working on a case.

For purposes of passing state bar examinations, many law school graduates take specialized bar review courses from private course providers such as Barbri, Kaplan and Themis. These bar reviews typically consist of lectures, often video recorded.

== History ==
=== Before law schools ===
Until the late 19th century, law schools were uncommon in the United States. Most people entered the legal profession through reading law, a form of independent study or apprenticeship, often under the supervision of an experienced attorney. This practice usually consisted of reading classic legal texts, such as Edward Coke's Institutes of the Lawes of England and William Blackstone's Commentaries on the Laws of England.

In colonial America law schools did not exist. Within a few years following the American Revolution, some universities such as the College of William and Mary and the University of Pennsylvania established a "Chair in Law". Columbia College appointed its first Professor of Law, James Kent, in 1793. Those who held these positions were the sole purveyors of legal education (per se) for their institutions—though law was, of course, discussed in other academic areas as a matter of course—and gave lectures designed to supplement, rather than replace, an apprenticeship.

=== The first law schools ===
The first institution established for the sole purpose of teaching law was the Litchfield Law School, set up by Judge Tapping Reeve in 1784 to organize the large number of would-be apprentices or lecture attendees that he attracted. Despite the success of that institution, and of similar programs set up thereafter at Harvard University (1817), Dickinson College (1834), Yale University (1843), Albany Law School (1851), Columbia University (1858), and the University of Michigan (1859), law school attendance would remain a rare exception in the profession. Apprenticeship would be the norm until the 1890s, when the American Bar Association (which had been formed in 1878) began pressing states to limit admission to the bar to those who had satisfactorily completed several years of post-graduate instruction. In 1906, the Association of American Law Schools adopted a requirement that law school consist of a three-year course of study.

Another key evolution was from law school as an alternative to undergraduate education to law school as a form of graduate professional education. Before 1870, there was nothing like a modern university in America, only a number of glorified liberal arts colleges which taught Greek, Latin, moral philosophy, and mathematics to undergraduates. The early law departments attached to these purported universities, such as the ones at Harvard and Yale, were in competition for those same undergraduates. Students at the time chose law school or college, but not both. Law schools were technical schools with "second-class status" which usually had lower admissions standards than the colleges they were competing against for undergraduates. For example, in 1904, Hugo Black was denied admission to the University of Alabama's Academic Department, the ancestor of its College of Arts and Sciences, but he got into its law school.

=== The dominance of Harvard Law School ===
Langdell's deanship from 1870 to 1895 transformed Harvard Law School into the "preeminent law school" in the United States, created the template for the modern American law school, and also established the modern expectation that "institutionalized legal training" was essential for "leaders of the profession". From 1870 to 1920, Harvard Law School proceeded "to overwhelm all the others" in every way imaginable, to the point that one critic, Gleason Archer Sr., wrote an entire self-published book harshly attacking Harvard as the "educational octopus" whose tentacles (i.e., Langdell's students) reached into every corner of the American legal community.

Langdell turned the law program at Harvard from a disorganized two-year undergraduate program―which undergraduates could wander into at any point―into a carefully structured three-year graduate program leading to a post-baccalaureate degree. It was also Harvard under Langdell which developed the modern concept of the American law professor, starting with the 1873 hiring of Ames: a career academic with limited practice experience "who was appointed for his scholarly and teaching potential". Before Ames, law school faculty members were either practicing lawyers who did some part-time teaching on the side, or full-time teachers who had moved into academia only after extensive experience practicing law.

Harvard's dominance was most rapidly established through the wild popularity of its teaching approach: the casebook method combined with the Socratic method. The transition from traditional lectures to the interactive examination of cases became "the law schools' apparent passport to academic respectability". Langdell actually did not invent that approach to teaching law, but it "became known as his by virtue of his determined and systematic application of the approach." Ames refined the approach further by contributing the ideas that casebooks should focus on cases selected for their "striking facts and vivid opinions", and group them together by subject. Langdell had simply printed cases chronologically. Finally, Langdell shifted law school examinations from the systematic exposition of rules (before him, students regurgitated legal rules in exam answers in a manner similar to hornbooks) to a problem-solving method tightly focused on the application of legal rules to specific hypothetical fact patterns (which eventually resulted in a common exam response format known as IRAC). It is this choice of Langdell's which explains why American law took "the atomistic rather than the unitary approach that distinguishes it from other common-law systems today".

The genius of the Harvard approach to teaching law was its financial cost-effectiveness: it was "both cheaper and more exciting for both teacher and student". Law schools could get away with a much higher ratio of students to professors than under the old system, where the professor would first deliver a lecture dryly summarizing a legal topic, and then try to verify whether students had actually absorbed any information through quizzes and recitations. By 1902, 12 of the 92 American law schools then in existence were already using the Harvard approach, and by 1907, that number was over 30.

Langdell's vision that law programs ought to be offered only at the graduate level and result in a post-baccalaureate degree took much longer to spread to all other American law schools. As of 1914, only Harvard and Penn were adhering to that principle. By 1921, the law schools at Stanford, Columbia, Western Reserve, and Yale were requiring a college degree for admission, but they also exempted undergraduates enrolled at the same university from that requirement.

The underlying obstacle was that at the turn of the 20th century, public education was still in its infancy in most of the United States—a defect which the country was belatedly struggling to correct in what is now known as the Progressive Era. In most areas, there were simply not enough high school or college graduates to fill a law school entering class. In 1899, Cornell University forced its law school to require a high school diploma for admission, like the rest of the university, and the law school saw the size of its entering class crash from 125 to 62. In 1909, Minnesota started to require a single year of college-level work as a prerequisite for law school admission and saw its entering class drop from 203 to 69.

=== Admission of women and people of color ===
==== Women ====
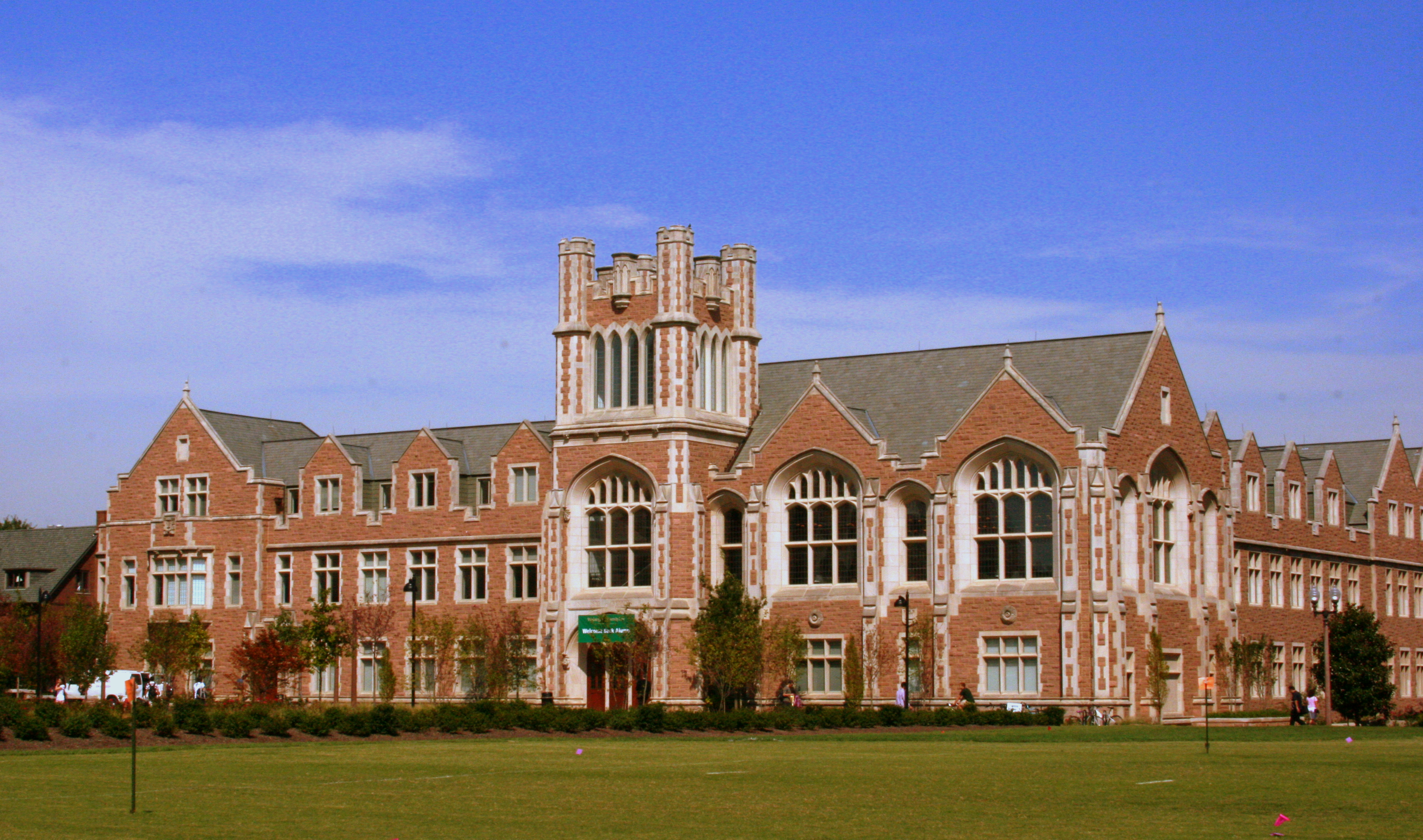
Washington University School of Law in St. Louis, the first chartered law school in the United States to admit women

Women were not allowed in most law schools during the late 1800s and the early 1900s. In 1869, two newly opened law schools permitted women to enroll: Washington University School of Law became the first chartered law school in America to admit women, and Howard University School of Law was founded with an open admissions policy accepting Black and White men and women to enroll. The "first woman on record to have received a law degree was Ada Kepley from Union College of Law in Illinois (Northwestern)" in 1870. Some law schools that allowed women before most others were Buffalo Law School which "begun in 1887 ... and open to women and immigrant groups"; University of Iowa College of Law which "admitted women as law students" since at least 1869; University of Michigan Law School; and Boston University School of Law which started admitting women in 1872.

In 1878, two women successfully sued to be admitted to the first class at Hastings Law School, one of whom was Clara S. Foltz. When the University of California established a second law program in 1894, this time on the Berkeley campus, it was open to women and men on an equal basis. Ellen Spencer Mussey and Emma Gillett founded the Washington Law School for women and men in 1898 (now known as, American University Washington College of Law).

The difficulty for women law students was further aggravated by the fact that courts did not allow women to be admitted as lawyers, as demonstrated in the famous case involving Myra Bradwell as the plaintiff in Bradwell v. Illinois (1870). The federal courts were subsequently opened to women in 1878 due to a successful campaign by Belva Ann Lockwood. Elite law schools remained closed to women for a while after.

Spurred by the suffragist movement for women, Harvard Law School started considering admitting women in 1899 but without success. Partly in response to the pressures of the suffragist movement and the unwillingness of elite law schools to open their doors, "in 1908, Portia Law School was founded in Boston" which later became the New England School of Law and was the only law school at the time with "an all women student body". In 1915, due to Harvard's continued refusal to admit women, the Cambridge Law School for Women was established as an alternative to elite law schools, and was to be "as nearly as possible a replica of the Harvard Law School as is possible to make it." World War I encouraged the movement toward admitting women to law schools, and in 1918, Fordham Law School and Yale Law School started admitting women. Northeastern University School of Law, at the time a YMCA institution, started admitting women in 1923. Harvard Law School did not admit women until 1950, and Notre Dame Law School.

Black women faced far greater barriers to entry into law than white women. As of 1940, there were a hundred times as many white women practicing law in the United States as Black women, although the profession remained over 97% white men. At that time, 4,146 white women practiced law (2.3% of all lawyers), along with 1,013 Black men (0.6%), and just 39 Black women in the entire country out of a total of over 177,000.

In spite of advances in admission to elite law schools in the mid-twentieth century, "[i]n 1963, women had comprised only 2.7 percent of the profession. In the academic year 1969–70, only 6.35 percent of the degree candidates at law school were women." A prevalent attitude has been mentioned several times by Hillary Clinton, who recalled that she had been accepted at Harvard Law School in 1969 but had been repelled by a professor who told her at a student-recruitment party, "we don't need any more women at Harvard." (She went to Yale Law School instead.) Attendance of women at law schools did however improve significantly in the next 10-year period. "In 1968, 3,704 of the 62,000 law students in approved schools were women; by 1979, there were 37,534 women out of 117,279 students in approved schools" although still represented in larger proportions in less elite law schools.

In 2016, the number of women enrolled in ABA-approved law schools reached the majority (50.09%), with female students being 55,766 of the total 111,327. Women enrollees have since outnumbered male enrollees every year. In 2024, the most recent year for which data is available, women made up 56.09 percent of all students in ABA-approved law schools. 17 of the top 20 law schools ranked by U.S. News & World Report Best Colleges Ranking in 2024 had more female than male attendees. Sharply increased from 10 percent in 2000, in 2024, 42 percent of law school deans are also women, according to Rosenblatt's Dean Database, 14 percent of whom are black women,

==== People of color ====
The oldest historically black law school in the United States is Howard University School of Law, part of Howard University, a private, federally chartered historically black research university in Washington, D.C. It is one of the oldest law schools in the country. The legal department, led by John Mercer Langston, opened in 1869 to address "a great need to train lawyers who would have a strong commitment to helping black Americans secure and protect their newly established rights" of the tumultuous Reconstruction era. Howard Law was the first school in the nation to have a non-discriminatory admissions policy. From its founding, it admitted white male and female students along with black students. Still, just eight women graduated from Howard Law during the first 30 years of its existence. Charlotte E. Ray was admitted to Howard's law program in 1869 and graduated in 1872, becoming its first black female lawyer. It is reported that Ray applied for admission to the bar using initials for her given and middle names, in order to disguise her gender, because she was "[a]ware of the school's reluctant commitment to the principle of sexual equality."

In 2024, the percentage of black, indigenous and people of color (BIPOC) enrolled in law school increased for the fifth year in a row, from 33.43 percent in 2023 to 36.30 percent in 2024, with BIPOC deans leading one third of law schools in 2024.

==== Notable figures ====
- First African American male law graduate: George Lewis Ruffin (1869)
- First female law graduate: Ada Kepley (1881) in 1870
- First African American female law graduate: Charlotte E. Ray (1872)
- First African American male to enroll and graduate from a state-supported law school: Walter Raleigh Jones in 1874
- First Chinese male to seek an American legal education: Sit Ming Cook (he was denied admission to a law school around 1878)
- First Chinese male to graduate from an American law school: Hong Yen Chang (1888) (c. 1886)
- First blind male law graduate: Josiah McIntyre (1889)
- First Native American (Chippewa) female law graduate: Marie Louise Bottineau Baldwin in 1914
- First Filipino American law graduate: Gonzalo Manibog (1917)
- One of the first Cape Verdean-born Americans to graduate with a J.D.: Alfred J. Gomes (1923)
- First Navajo male law graduate: Thomas Dodge (1924)
- First African American male to enroll in a predominantly-White Southern university since the Reconstruction era: Silas Herbert Hunt (1948)
- First Nisei female law graduate: Patsy Mink (1953) in 1951
- First African American female law graduate (law school in the South): Ada Lois Sipuel Fisher in 1951
- First deaf African American female law graduate: Claudia L. Gordon (c. 2000)
- First Potawatomi male: Jeff Crawford

== Credentials obtainable while in law school ==
Within each U.S. law school, key credentials include:

- Law review/Law journal membership or editorial position (based either on grades or write-on competition or both). This is important for at least three reasons. First, because it is determined by either grades or writing ability, membership is an indicator of strong academic performance. This leads to the second reason, which is that potential employers sometimes use law review membership in their hiring criteria. Third, work on law review exposes a student to legal scholarship and editing, and often allows the student to publish a significant piece of legal scholarship on his or her own. Most law schools have a "flagship" journal usually called "School name Law Review" (for example, the Harvard Law Review—although some schools call their flagship journal "School name Law Journal"; see Yale Law Journal) that publishes articles on all areas of law, and one or more other specialty law journals that publish articles concerning only a particular area of the law (for example, the Harvard Journal of Law & Technology).
- Moot court membership or award (based on oral and written argument). Success in moot court can distinguish one as an outstanding oral advocate and provides a degree of practical legal training that is often absent from law review membership. Moot court and related activities, such as Trial Advocacy and Dispute Resolution, may appeal especially to employers hiring for litigation positions, such as a district attorney's office.
- Mock trial membership and awards (based on trial level advocacy skills) also can distinguish one as an outstanding trial advocate and help develop "real world" skills that are often valuable to employers hiring for litigation positions.
- Order of the Coif membership (based on grade point average). This is often coupled with Latin honors (summa and magna cum laude, though often not cum laude). 91 ABA law schools, just under half, have chapters of the Order of the Coif on campus.
- Phi Delta Phi honor society membership. This society is organized around student chapters called "Inns", and the society has inducted many historic figures.

=== City, state, and federal court clerkship ===
Clerkships may be with city, state, or federal judges, and are meant to provide the recent law school graduate with experience working for a judge. On the basis of a student's credentials, as well as favorable faculty recommendations, some students obtain a one or two-year clerkship with a judge after graduation. While the majority of judges traditionally choose incoming clerks while they are still in law school, or as they complete another clerkship, in the 2020s; some judges seek out clerks with some private law practice experience.

=== United States Supreme Court clerkship ===
Some law school graduates are able to clerk for one of the Justices on the Supreme Court (each Justice takes two to four clerks per year). Often, these clerks are graduates of elite law schools, with Harvard, Yale, the University of Chicago, the University of Michigan, Columbia, the University of Virginia, and Stanford being among the most highly represented schools. Justice Clarence Thomas is the major exception to the rule that Justices hire clerks from elite schools; he takes pride in selecting clerks from non-top-tier schools, and publicly noted that his clerks have been attacked on the Internet as "third tier trash".

Lady Justice

== Controversies involving U.S. law schools ==
=== Employment statistics and salary information ===
After the JD, a large study of law graduates who passed the bar examination, found that even graduates of lower ranked law schools were typically making six figure ($100,000+) incomes within 12 years after graduation. Graduates of higher ranking schools typically earned more than $170,000. The Economic Value of a Law Degree, a peer-reviewed study which included law graduates who did not pass the bar exam and were not practicing law, found that law graduates at the 25th percentile of earnings ability typically earned around $20,000 more every year than they would have earned with only a bachelor's degree. Graduates at the 75th percentile earned around $80,000 more per year than they likely would have earned with a bachelor's degree. However, only around 60 to 70 percent of law graduates practice law. Some authors have criticized employment information supplied directly by law schools; however, these studies report information supplied directly by law graduates, and in the case of the latter study, collected by the United States Census Bureau as part of a broader economic survey.

=== The New York Times negative press coverage ===
Starting in 2011, American law schools became the subject of a series of critical articles in mainstream news publications, starting with a series of The New York Times articles by David Segal. (The newspaper had also published similarly critical reportage during previous decades.) During the 2010s, such articles have reported on the debt loads of law graduates, the difficulty of securing employment in the legal profession, and insufficient practical training at American law schools. A number of critics have pointed out factual inaccuracies and logical errors in The New York Times' higher education coverage, especially related to law schools.

More recent press coverage by some higher education reporters has noted that peer-reviewed studies and comprehensive data suggests that law graduates are still typically better off financially than they would be had they not attended law school, notwithstanding challenges facing recent graduates.

=== Lawsuits related to American legal education ===
In 1995, the United States Department of Justice sued the American Bar Association, the accrediting body of American law schools, for allegedly violating the Sherman Antitrust Act. The settlement of the suit prohibited the ABA from using salary of faculty or administrators as an accreditation criterion.

In 2011, several law schools were sued for fraud and for misleading job placement statistics. Most of these suits have been dismissed on the merits.

=== Political balance ===
Liberal professors have claimed that there is conservative bias in law schools, particularly within law and economics and business law fields. Liberals have also argued for affirmative action to increase the representation of women and minorities among law students and law faculty.

Conservative students have argued that there is a liberal bias among top tier law faculty.

=== 2024 text message controversy ===
During 2024, female law students, professors and deans across the nation received anonymous text messages complaining that women are outperforming men at law schools on their personal cellphones, stating such as "Law school isn't fair for us men", sparking an FBI investigation.

=== Alaska ===
As of 2024, Alaska remains the only state without a law school. Although some state lawmakers have called for the University of Alaska to establish a law school, a 2004 study commissioned for the University of Alaska Anchorage found little economic justification for this and instead recommended that the state "should begin with a grant or incentive program for law students attending school outside [Alaska]", and to "develop partnerships with ABA accredited law schools to deliver summer programs and externships in Alaska."

=== 2024–2025 protests and recruiting boycotts ===
In 2024, the nation's law students began to organize numerous protests against U.S. involvement in the Gaza war, prompting some lawmakers and law schools to introduce restrictions, as well as harsher responses, in 2025, as President Donald Trump's administration began deporting international students involved in protests.

Following the acquiescence of several elite firms to punitive executive orders issued by President Trump, early in his second term, in 2025; student protests arose, some urging law student application boycotts of the capitulating firms.

A "Biglaw Spine Index: Response to EOs targeting Biglaw" chart was published on April 4 by Above the Law.

== Law school rankings ==
There are several different law school rankings, each with a different emphasis and different methodology. Most either emphasize inputs or readily measurable outcomes (i.e., outcomes shortly after graduation); none measure value-added or long-term outcomes. In general, these rankings are controversial, not universally accepted as authoritative.

=== U.S. News & World Report ===
U.S. News & World Report's annually ranks law schools based on various qualitative and quantitative factors, e.g., entering student LSAT scores and GPAs, reputation surveys, expenditures per student, etc. U.S. News ratings heavily emphasize inputs—student test scores and grades, law school expenditures—but includes some outcomes such as bar passage and employment shortly after graduation. U.S. News rankings are heavily weighted toward "reputation", which is measured through a survey with small sample size and low response rates. The reputation scores are highly correlated with the previous years' reputation scores and may not reflect changes in law school quality over time.

==== U.S. News Top 14 law schools ====
The "Top Fourteen" or "T14" are common, colloquial references to the 14 institutions historically listed as the top 14 American law schools by the annual U.S. News & World Report Best Colleges Ranking; "T14" schools are also traditionally the only ones to have ever placed within the top 10 spots of the rankings. Although "T14" is not a designation used by U.S. News itself, the term is "widely known in the legal community". While these schools have seen their position within the top 14 spots shift frequently, they have generally not placed outside of the top 14 since the inception of the rankings. There have been rare exceptions: Texas and UCLA appeared in the 1987 list, before the start of the annual rankings (ahead of Northwestern and Cornell); Texas and UCLA displaced Georgetown in 2018 and 2022, respectively, and Cornell fell to the 18th spot in 2025.Because of their relatively consistent placement at the top of these rankings, the schools that have taken the annual top spots since 1990 are commonly referred to as the "Top Fourteen" by published books on law school admissions, undergraduate university pre-law advisers, professional law school consultants, and newspaper articles on the subject.

Those 14 schools, alphabetically, are: Berkeley, Chicago, Columbia, Cornell, Duke, Georgetown, Harvard, Michigan, New York University, Northwestern, Penn, Stanford, Virginia, and Yale.

=== Other rankings ===
The Social Science Research Network—a repository for draft and completed scholarship in law and the social sciences—publishes monthly rankings of law schools based on the number of times faculty members' scholarship was downloaded. Rankings are available by total number of downloads, total number of downloads within the last 12 months, and downloads per faculty member to adjust for the size of different institutions. SSRN also provides rankings of individual law school faculty members on these metrics.

Brian Leiter compiles a regular series of evaluations called "Brian Leiter's Law School Reports" in which he and other commentators discuss law schools. Leiter's rankings tend to emphasize the quality and quantity of faculty scholarship, as measured by citations in a select group of journals.

Several other ranking systems are explicitly designed to focus on employment outcomes at or shortly after graduation, including rankings by the National Law Journal, Vault.com and Above the Law. The National Law Journal provides a comparison of its employment-based rankings to U.S. News rankings. For students who are primarily interested in lucrative employment outcomes rather than scholarly prestige, this comparison may suggest which law schools are most undervalued by the market.

== Oldest active law schools ==
Law schools are listed by the dates from when they were first established.

1. William & Mary Law School, established 1779 (closed in 1861 and reopened in 1920)
2. University of Maryland Francis King Carey School of Law, established 1816, held first classes in 1824 (closed during the American Civil War and reopened shortly after its end)
3. Harvard Law School, established 1817 (oldest continuously open school)
4. University of Virginia School of Law, established 1819
5. Yale Law School, established 1824
6. University of Cincinnati College of Law, established 1833
7. Pennsylvania State University Dickinson School of Law, established 1834
8. New York University School of Law, established 1835
9. Indiana University Maurer School of Law, established 1842
10. Saint Louis University School of Law, established in 1843 (closed in 1847 and reopened in 1908)
11. University of North Carolina School of Law, established 1845
12. Louis D. Brandeis School of Law (University of Louisville), established 1846
13. Cumberland School of Law, established in 1847
14. Tulane University Law School, established 1847
15. Washington and Lee University School of Law, established 1849
16. Baylor Law School, established 1849 (closed in 1883 and reestablished 1920)
17. University of Pennsylvania Law School, established 1850
18. Albany Law School, established 1851
19. University of Mississippi School of Law, established 1854
20. Columbia Law School, established 1858

== See also ==
- List of law schools in the United States
- List of law schools attended by United States Supreme Court justices
- IRAC
- Law School Admission Council
- Correspondence law school
- School of Canon Law
