= Tactical decision game =

Decision game that puts students in the role of the commander of a tactical unit

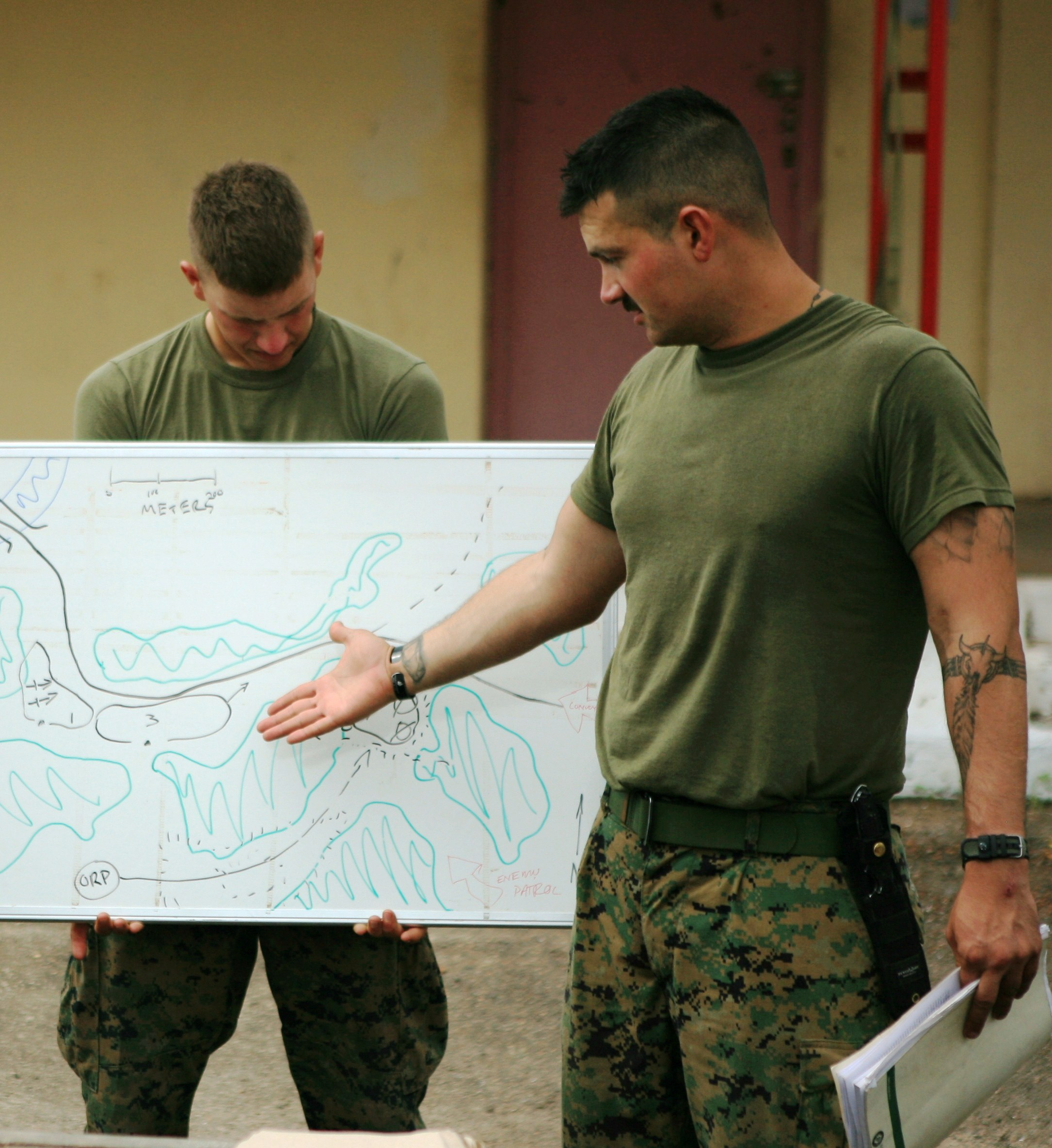
Sergeant Daniel Smith, USMC, a squad leader with the Ground Combat Element, Security Cooperation Task Force, Africa Partnership Station 2011, conducts a tactical decision game for his Marines.

A tactical decision game is a decision game that puts students in the role of the commander of a tactical unit who is faced with a challenging problem. While most tactical decision games depict problems faced by the commanders of military units, a growing number deal with the situations of types dealt with by police and firefighting organizations .

The tactical decision game is known by a variety of names. These include map problem, tactical problem, one-step war game, and tactical decision exercise.

Like other types of decision games, tactical decision games may either be historical or fictional. If the scenario is based entirely upon a reliable historical narrative, a tactical decision game is also a decision-forcing case. (Such an exercise may also be called an historical map problem.) However, if any of the elements in the scenario of a tactical decision game is fictional, then the exercise is a kind of fictional decision game.

== Tactical Decision Games Before 1800 ==
In Chapter 14 of The Prince, Niccolò Machiavelli tells the story of the Greek general Philopoemon, who made extensive use of tactical decision games.

“Philopoemon, Prince of the Achaeans, among other praises which writers have bestowed on him, is commended because in time of peace he never had anything in his mind but the rules of war; and when he was in the country with friends, he often stopped and reasoned with them: “If the enemy should be upon that hill, and we should find ourselves here with our army, with whom would be the advantage? How should one best advance to meet him, keeping the ranks? If we should wish to re-treat, how ought we to set about it? If they should retreat, how ought we to pursue?” And he would set forth to them, as he went, all the chances that could befall an army; he would listen to their opinion and state his, confirming it with reasons, so that by these continual discussions there could never arise, in time of war, any unexpected circumstances that he could deal with.”

== Tactical Decision Games in Prussia and Germany ==
Helmuth von Moltke, who served as chief of the Prussian General Staff from 1857 to 1888, made extensive use of tactical decision games to train his subordinates and inform contingency planning. Called "tactical assignments" (taktische Aufgaben), these problems employed fictional scenarios in which ideal units were employed on actual terrain. Some of these games were gathered into a book, Moltkes taktische Aufgaben aus den Jahren 1858 bis 1882, which was published in 1892 as the second volume of a multi-volume set of Moltke's collected works. Two years later, an English translation of this book came out under the title Moltke's Tactical Problems from 1858 to 1882.

In sharp contrast to Moltke's tactical decision games, which had no direct connection to actual engagements, those published by Julius von Verdy du Vernois often made explicit use of real-world events. The problems contained in the first volume of Verdy's Kriegsgeschichtliche Studien nach der applikatorischen Methode (Military Historical Studies by means of the Applicatory Method) were all based on incidents of the battle that took place between Austrian and Italian forces on 24 June 1866. However, in an attempt to make the games more useful to German officers, he replaced the actual (Austrian and Italian) formations engaged in the battle with an imaginary German infantry division, thereby converting what would have been decision-forcing cases into fictional decision games. (Originally published in 1876, this work was later translated into English as A Tactical Study Based on the Battle of Custozza.)

In his earlier (and more famous) work, the four volume Studien über Truppen-Führung), Verdy also used historical events as the starting point for his games. However, in addition to fictionalizing orders of battle, he also changed the outcomes of particular engagements. (The word Truppen-Führung, which is often translated as "troop leading" or "the leading of troops", refers to the art of handling of combined arms formations: infantry divisions, cavalry divisions, and army corps.)

== Tactical Decision Games in the United States Armed Forces ==
In 1975, the Simulation Center of the 9th Infantry Division of the United States Army published a training package for junior leaders called What Now, Lieutenant?. Designed to be used in conjunction with a war game of the same name, this package consisted of scenarios that described situations faced by the commanders of battalions, companies, and platoons. In 1982, the Education Center of the United States Marine Corps Development and Education Command used this package as the starting point for a series of three "instructional pamphlets": Tactical Problems for Battalion Commanders, Tactical Problems for Platoon Leaders/Company Commanders, and Tactical Problems for Squad Leaders. In addition to twelve problems taken from What Now, Lieutenant?, the Tactical Problems ... series contained sixteen games that were written expressly for the series by Chief Warrant Officer Bryan N. Lavender, USMC.

Like the scenarios in What Now, Lieutenant?, the games in the Tactical Problems ... series were based them on descriptions of actual engagements that took place between 1914 and 1953. Some of these were first-hand accounts written by S.L.A. Marshall, Erwin Rommel, and Friedrich von Mellenthin. Others were secondary works composed by military historians.) Regardless of the actual events that inspired them, all of the problems were modified to reflect the organization and equipment of the 1980s. Thus, none of these historically-inspired games can be classified as decision-forcing cases.)

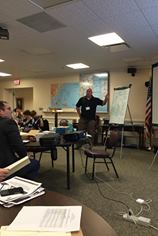
Major Donald Vandergriff, US Army (Retired), teaches a tactical decision game at a meeting of the Defense Entrepreneurs Forum on 25 April 2015.
