= Accelerated JD program =

American legal program

In United States legal education, accelerated JD Program may refer to one of the following:

- A "3+3 JD program" or "BA to JD program" is a program in which students combine certain requirements of a bachelor's degree (usually a BA) with the requirements of a Juris Doctor degree. Students thus usually receive their bachelor's degree after completing the first year of law school. Typically, students complete the two degrees in six years rather than the usual seven. The undergraduate college and law school may either be independent institutions, or part of a single large university. Accelerated JD programs differ from most dual degree programs in that the degrees are of different levels, and are obtained sequentially rather than concurrently. Requirements for admission of undergraduates to such programs are typically higher than for general enrollment. Some programs further restrict enrollment to students in a specific pre-law major.
- A "2-year JD program" is a Juris Doctor degree that is offered independently of a bachelor's degree. Typically, students are required to complete the same number of credit hours as traditional three-year JD students, but in a more condensed period.

U.S. News & World Report stated that as a result of student concerns about the time and cost (both in terms of tuition and the opportunity cost associated with foregoing a salary for three years) required to complete a law degree, there has been an emerging trend to develop accelerated JD programs.

== See also ==
- Pre-law
- Academic acceleration
- Legal education
