= Christopher Columbus Langdell =

American legal academic (1826–1906)

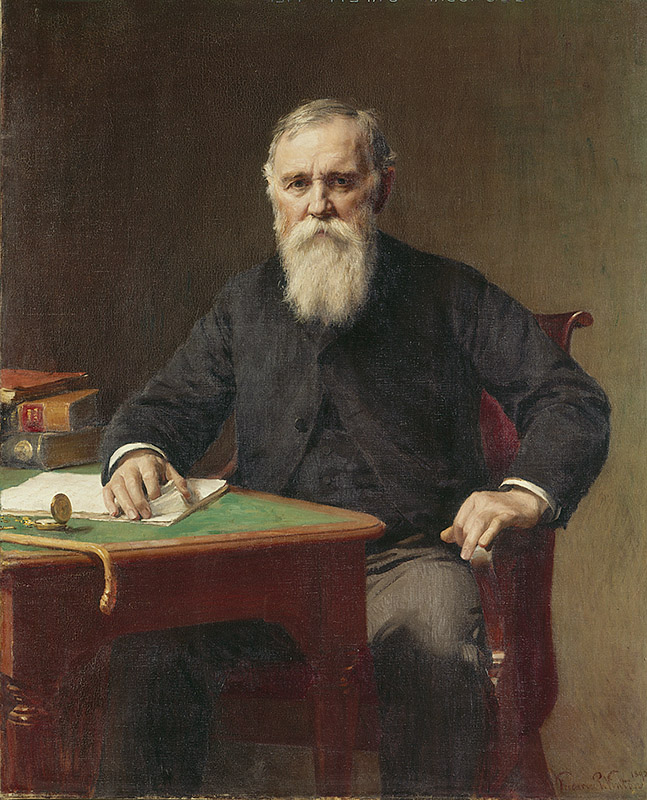
- Portrait of Langdell by Frederick Porter Vinton, 1892
- Born: May 22, 1826; New Boston, New Hampshire, U.S.
- Died: July 6, 1906 (aged 80); Cambridge, Massachusetts, U.S.
- Education: Harvard University
- Known for: Casebook method

1st Dean of Harvard Law School
- In office 1870–1895
- Succeeded by: James Barr Ames

Signature
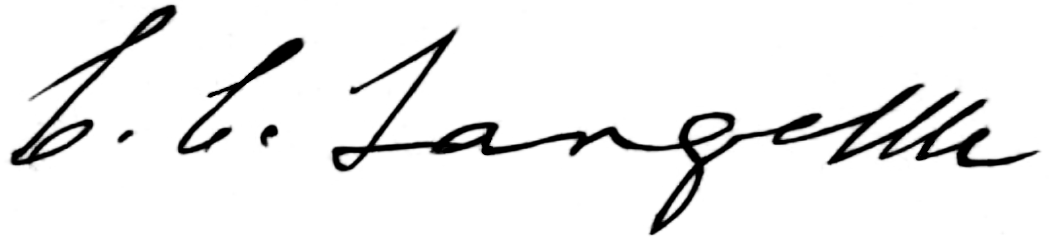

Christopher Columbus Langdell (May 22, 1826 – July 6, 1906) was an American jurist and legal academic who was Dean of Harvard Law School from 1870 to 1895. As a professor and administrator, he pioneered the casebook method of instruction, which has since been widely adopted in American law schools and adapted for other professional disciplines, such as business, public policy, and education. He has been referred to as "arguably the most influential teacher in the history of professional education in the United States".

Langdell's legacy lies in the educational and administrative reforms he made to Harvard Law School, a task he was entrusted with by President Charles Eliot. Before Langdell's tenure the study of law was a rather technical pursuit in which students were simply told what the law is. Langdell applied the principles of pragmatism to the teaching of law as a result of which students were compelled to use their own reasoning powers to understand how the law might apply in a given case. This dialectical process came to be called the case method and has been the primary method of pedagogy at American law schools ever since. The case method has since been adopted and improved upon by schools in other disciplines, such as business, public policy, and education.

== Life ==
Christopher Langdell was born in the town of New Boston, New Hampshire, of English and Scots-Irish ancestry.

=== Education ===
He studied at Phillips Exeter Academy from 1845 to 1848, at Harvard College from 1848 to 1850 and at Harvard Law School from 1851 to 1854. As a student, he served as one of the Harvard Law School's first librarians.

=== Career ===
From 1854 to 1870 he practiced law in New York City. In January 1870 he received an invitation from Charles Eliot to take up the chair of Dane Professor of Law at Harvard Law School. Langdell accepted the offer and soon after became Dean of the Law Faculty, succeeding Theophilus Parsons, to whose Treatise on the Law of Contracts (1853) he had contributed as a student. As Dean he introduced sweeping changes to the curriculum of the Law school, extending the length of the academic programme from one to three years and replacing the old-style lecture system with a new system of tuition which required a significantly greater level of engagement and input from students. He rejected the tradition in English-speaking countries of learning law by professional apprenticeship, in favor of the European tradition of a university education. He insisted that law teaching had to be supported by an extensive law library, for "law is a science" and "all the available materials of that science are contained in printed books". He was elected a Fellow of the American Academy of Arts and Sciences in 1870 and received the degree of LL.D. in 1875.

Langdell resigned the deanship in 1895, in 1900 became Dane Professor Emeritus. In 1903 a chair in the law school was named in his honor.

He died on July 6, 1906, died in Cambridge, Massachusetts. After his death the school's primary academic building, housing both the world's largest academic law library and classrooms, was named Langdell Hall.

== Influence on legal education ==
Langdell made the Harvard Law School a success by remodeling its administration. In a private correspondence of April 13, 1915, Charles W. Eliot wrote: "the putting of Langdell in charge of the Law School was the best piece of work I did for Harvard University, except the reconstruction of the Medical school in [18]70 and [18]71, and the long fight for the development of the elective system."

Langdell's greatest innovation was his introduction of the case method of instruction. Until 1890, no other U.S. law school used this method, which is now standard. Moreover, the standard first-year curriculum at all American law schools — Contracts, Property, Torts, Criminal Law, and Civil Procedure — stands, mostly unchanged, from the curriculum Langdell instituted.

Langdell, who came from a relatively unknown family, was conscious of the fact that students from more privileged backgrounds often received higher grades in their coursework purely because of their family's wealth and social status. He instituted the process of blind grading, now common at U.S. law schools, so that students already known by professors or from esteemed families would have no advantage over others.

== Works ==
- Selection of Cases on the Law of Contracts (1871, the first book used in the case system; enlarged, 1879)
- A Selection of Cases on Sales of Personal Property (1872)
- A Summary of Equity Pleading (1877, 2nd ed., 1883)
- Cases in Equity Pleading (1883)
- Brief Survey of Equity Jurisdiction (1905)

Academic offices
Preceded by New title	Dean of Harvard Law School; 1870–1895	Succeeded by James Barr Ames
