= Case method =

Teaching approach

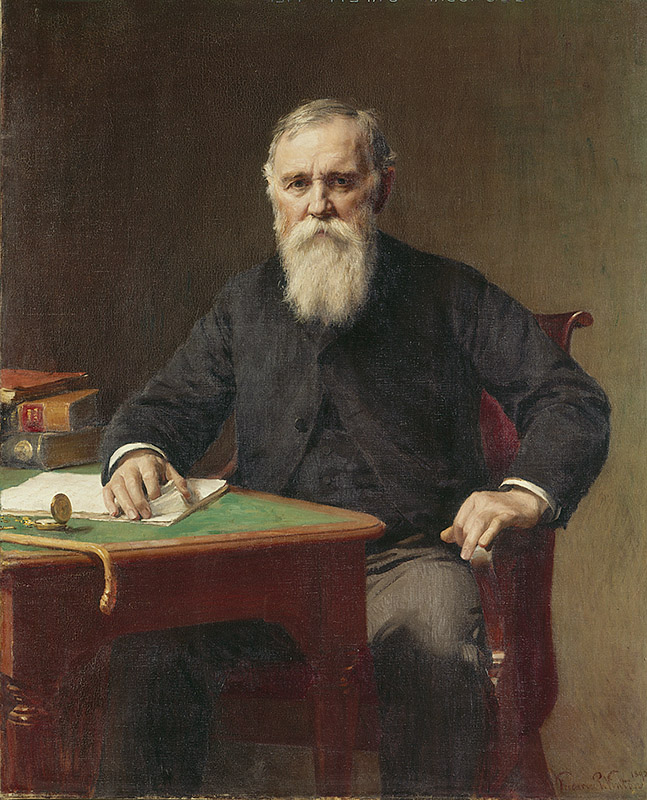
Christopher Columbus Langdell, pioneer of case method

The case method is a teaching approach that uses decision-forcing cases to put students in the role of people who were faced with difficult decisions at some point in the past. It developed during the course of the twentieth-century from its origins in the casebook method of teaching law pioneered by Harvard legal scholar Christopher C. Langdell. In sharp contrast to many other teaching methods, the case method requires that instructors refrain from providing their own opinions about the decisions in question. Rather, the chief task of instructors who use the case method is asking students to devise, describe, and defend solutions to the problems presented by each case.

== Comparison with the casebook method of teaching law ==
The case method evolved from the casebook method, a mode of teaching based on Socratic principles pioneered at Harvard Law School by Christopher C. Langdell. Like the casebook method the case method calls upon students to take on the role of an actual person faced with a difficult problem.

== Decision-forcing cases ==
A decision-forcing case is a kind of decision game. Like any other kinds of decision games, a decision-forcing case puts students in a role of person faced with a problem (often called the "protagonist") and asks them to devise, defend, discuss, and refine solutions to that problem. However, in sharp contrast to decision games that contain fictional elements, decision-forcing cases are based entirely upon reliable descriptions of real events.

A decision-forcing case is also a kind of case study. That is, it is an examination of an incident that took place at some time in the past. However, in contrast to a retrospective case study, which provides a complete description of the events in question, a decision-forcing case is based upon an "interrupted narrative." This is an account that stops whenever the protagonist finds himself faced with an important decision. In other words, while retrospective case studies ask students to analyze past decisions with the aid of hindsight, decision-forcing cases ask students to engage problems prospectively.

== Criticisms of decision-forcing cases ==
After corporate scandals and the 2008 financial crisis, the case method was criticized for contributing to a narrow, instrumental, amoral, managerial perspective on business where making decisions which maximise profit is all that matters, ignoring the social responsibilities of organisations. It is argued that the case method puts too much emphasis on taking action and not enough on thoughtful reflection to see things from different perspectives. It has been suggested that different approaches to case writing, that do not put students in the ‘shoes’ of a manager, be encouraged to address these concerns.

== Role play ==
Every decision-forcing case has a protagonist, the historical person who was faced with the problem or problem that students are asked to solve. Thus, in engaging these problems, students necessarily engage in some degree of role play.

Some case teachers, such as those of the Marine Corps University, place a great deal of emphasis on role play, to the point of addressing each student with the name and titles of the protagonist of the case. (A student playing the role of a king, for example, is asked "Your Majesty, what are your orders?") Other case teachers, such as those at the Harvard Business School, place less emphasis on role play, asking students "what would you do if you were the protagonist of the case."

== Historical solution ==
After discussing student solutions to the problem at the heart of a decision-forcing case, a case teacher will often provide a description of the historical solution, that is, the decision made by the protagonist of the case. Also known as "the rest of the story", "the epilogue", or (particularly at Harvard University) "the 'B' case", the description of the historical solution can take the form of a printed article, a video, a slide presentation, a short lecture, or even an appearance by the protagonist.

Whatever the form of the description of the historical solution, the case teacher must take care to avoid giving the impression that the historical solution is the "right answer." Rather, he should point out that the historical solution to the problem serves primarily to provide students with a baseline to which they can compare their own solutions.

Some case teachers will refrain from providing the historical solution to students. One reason for not providing the historical solution is to encourage students to do their own research about the outcome of the case. Another is to encourage students to think about the decision after the end of the class discussion. "Analytic and problem-solving learning," writes Kirsten Lundgren of Columbia University, "can be all the more powerful when the 'what happened' is left unanswered.

== Complex cases ==
A classic decision-forcing case asks students to solve a single problem faced by a single protagonist at a particular time. There are, however, decision-forcing cases in which students play the role of a single protagonist who is faced with a series of problems, two or more protagonists dealing with the same problem, or two or more protagonists dealing with two or more related problems.

== Decision-forcing staff rides ==
A decision-forcing case conducted in the place where the historical decisions at the heart of the case were made is called a "decision-forcing staff ride." Also known as an "on-site decision-forcing case", a decision-forcing staff ride should not be confused with the two very different exercises that are also known as "staff rides": retrospective battlefield tours of the type practiced by the United States Army in the twentieth century and the on-site contingency planning exercises (Stabs Reisen, literally "staff journeys") introduced by Gerhard von Scharnhorst in 1801 and made famous by the elder Hellmuth von Moltke in the middle years of the nineteenth century.

To avoid confusion between "decision-forcing staff rides" and staff rides of other sorts, the Case Method Project at the Marine Corps University in Quantico, Virginia, adopted the term "Russell Ride" to describe the decision-forcing staff rides that it conducts. The term is an homage to Major General John Henry Russell Jr., USMC, the 16th Commandant of the United States Marine Corps and an avid supporter of the applicatory method of instruction.

== Sandwich metaphors ==
Decision-forcing cases are sometimes described with a system of metaphors that compares them to various types of sandwiches. In this system, pieces of bread serve as a metaphor for narrative elements (i.e. the start, continuation, or end of an account) and filling of the sandwich serves as a metaphor for a problem that students are asked to solve.

A decision-forcing case in which one protagonist is faced with two problems is thus a "triple-decker case." (The bottom piece of bread is the background to the first problem, the second piece of bread is both the historical solution to the first problem and the background to the second problem, and the third piece of bread is the historical solution to the second problem.) Similarly, a decision-forcing case for which the historical solution is not provided (and is thus a case with but one narrative element) is an "open-face" or "smørrebrød" case.

A decision-forcing case in which students are asked to play the role of a decision-maker who is faced with a series of decisions in a relatively short period of time is sometimes called a "White Castle", "slider" case. or "day in the life" case.

== Case materials ==
Case materials are any materials that are used to inform the decisions made by students in the course of a decision-forcing case. Commonly used case materials include articles that were composed for the explicit purpose of informing case discussion, secondary works initially produced for other purposes, historical documents, artifacts, video programs, and audio programs.

Case materials are made available to students at a variety times in the course of a decision-forcing case. Materials that provide background are distributed at, or before, the beginning of the class meeting. Materials that describe the solution arrived at by the protagonist and the results of that solution are passed out at, or after, the end of the class meeting. (These are called "the B-case", "the rest of the story", or "the reveal.") Materials that provide information that became available to the protagonist in the course of solving the problem are given to students in the course of a class meeting. (These are often referred to as "handouts.")

Case materials may be either "refined" or "raw." Refined case materials are secondary works that were composed expressly for use as part of decision-forcing cases. (Most of the case materials that are available from case clearing houses and academic publishers are of the refined variety.) Raw case materials are those that were initially produced for reasons other than the informing of a case discussion. These include newspaper articles, video and audio news reports, historical documents, memoirs, interviews, and artifacts.

== Published case materials ==
A number of organizations, to include case clearing houses, academic publishers, and professional schools, publish case materials. These organizations include:

- Blavatnik School of Government
- Harvard Business School
- Stanford Graduate School of Business
- Columbia Business School
- IESE Business School
- INSEAD
- ICFAI Business School Hyderabad
- Ivey Business School
- Indian School of Business
- Indian Institute of Management, Ahmedabad
- Darden School of Business at the University of Virginia
- Nagoya University of Commerce & Business
- Asian Institute of Management
- Asian Case Research Centre at the University of Hong Kong
- Globalens at the University of Michigan
- Centre for Management Practice at Singapore Management University

== The Case Centre ==
The Case Centre (formerly the European Case Clearing House), headquartered in Cranfield University, Cranfield, Bedford, United Kingdom, and with its US office at Babson College, Wellesley, Massachusetts, is the independent home of the case method. It is a membership-based organization with more than 500 members worldwide, not-for-profit organisation and registered charity founded in 1973.

The Case Centre is world’s largest repository of case studies used in Management Education, with cases from Harvard Business School, ICFAI Business School Hyderabad, the Blavatnik School of Government, INSEAD, IMD, Ivey Business School, Darden School of Business, London Business School or Singapore Management University. Its stated aim is to promote the case method by sharing knowledge, skills, and expertise among both teachers and students. For that purpose it engages in various activities like conducting case method workshops, offering case scholarships, publishing a journal, and organizing a global case method awards.

According to The Case Centre, IESE Publishing distributes business teaching materials in Spanish and has a large collection of cases set in Spanish-speaking countries.

The Case Centre Awards (known as the European Awards from 1991 and 2010) recognises outstanding case writers and teachers worldwide. These prestigious awards, popularly known as the case method community's annual 'Oscars', or the “business education Oscars, celebrate worldwide excellence in case writing and teaching.

== The narrative fallacy ==
The presentation of a decision-forcing case necessarily takes the form of a story in which the protagonist is faced with a difficult problem. This can lead to "the narrative fallacy", a mistake that leads both case teachers and the developers of case materials to ignore information that, while important to the decision that students will be asked to make, complicates the telling of the story. This, in turn, can create a situation in which, rather than engaging the problem at the heart of the case, students "parse the case materials." That is, they make decisions on the basis of the literary structure of the case materials rather than the underlying reality.

Techniques for avoiding the narrative fallacy include the avoidance of standard formats for case materials; awareness of tropes and clichés; the use of case materials originally created for purposes other than case teaching; and the deliberate inclusion of "distractors" – information that is misleading, irrelevant, or at odds with other information presented in the case.

== Purpose of the case method ==
The case method gives students the ability to quickly make sense of a complex problem, rapidly arrive at a reasonable solution, and communicate that solution to others in a succinct and effective manner. In the course of doing this, the case method also accomplishes a number of other things, each of which is valuable in its own right. By exciting the interest of students, the case method fosters interest in professional matters. By placing such things in a lively context, the case method facilitates the learning of facts, nomenclature, conventions, techniques, and procedures. By providing both a forum for discussion and concrete topics to discuss, the case method encourages professional dialogue. By providing challenging practice in the art of decision-making, the case method refines professional judgement. By asking difficult questions, the case method empowers students to reflect upon the peculiar demands of their profession.

In his classic essay on the case method ("Because Wisdom Can't Be Told"), Charles I. Gragg of the Harvard Business School argued that "the case system, properly used, initiates students into the ways of independent thought and responsible judgement."

== Incompatible objectives ==
While the case method can be used to accomplish a wide variety of goals, certain objectives are at odds with its nature as an exercise in professional judgement. These incompatible objectives include attempts to use decision-forcing cases to:

- provide an example to be emulated
- paint a particular person as a hero or a villain
- encourage (or discourage) a particular type of behavior
- illustrate a pre-existing theory

Thomas W. Shreeve, who uses the case method to teach people in the field of military intelligence, argues that "Cases are not meant to illustrate either the effective or the ineffective handling of administrative, operational, logistic, ethical, or other problems, and the characters in cases should not be portrayed either as paragons of virtue or as archvillains. The instructor/casewriter must be careful not to tell the students what to think—they are not empty vessels waiting to be filled with wisdom. With this method of teaching, a major share of the responsibility for thinking critically about the issues under discussion is shifted to the students, where it belongs."

== Disclaimers ==
Case materials are often emblazoned with a disclaimer that warns both teachers and students to avoid the didactic, hortatory, and "best practices" fallacies. Here are some examples of such disclaimers:

This case is intended to serve as the basis for class discussion rather than to illustrate either the effective or ineffective handling of a situation.
This decision-forcing case is an exercise designed to foster empathy, creativity, a bias for action, and other martial virtues. As such, it makes no argument for the effectiveness of any particular course of action, technique, procedure, or convention.
This case is intended to serve as the basis for class discussion rather than to illustrate either the effective or ineffective handling of a situation. Its purpose is to put the student in the shoes of the decision-maker in order to gain a fuller understanding of the situations and the decisions made.

== Use of the case method in professional schools ==
The case method is used in a variety of professional schools. These include the:

- Harvard Business School
- IESE Business School
- Columbia Business School
- Singapore Management University
- Blavatnik School of Government
- INCAE Business School
- ICFAI Business School Hyderabad
- The Acton School of Business
- Hogeschool van Amsterdam
- Asian Institute of Management
- Indian Institute of Management, Ahmedabad
- Richard Ivey School of Business
- John F. Kennedy School of Government at Harvard University
- NUCB Business School at the Nagoya University of Commerce & Business
- Darden School of Business at the University of Virginia
- Columbia School of Journalism
- Mailman School of Public Health, Columbia University
- School of International and Public Affairs, Columbia University
- Yale School of Management
- Marine Corps University
- Cranfield School of Management
- School of Advertising & Public Relations, University of Texas
- Suleman Dawood School of Business at the Lahore University of Management Sciences
- Institute of Business Administration, Karachi
- Michael G. Foster School of Business
- Institute for Financial Management and Research
- Institute of Chartered Accountants in England and Wales

University of Fujairah- MBA Program

- INALDE Business School in Bogota, Colombia

== See also ==
- Business schools
- Case competition
- Case study
- Casebook method (used by law schools)
- Decision game
- European Case Clearing House
- Experiential learning
- Harvard Business Publishing
- Teaching method

== Literature ==
- Corey, Raymond (1998), Case Method Teaching, Harvard Business School 9-581-058, Rev. November 6, 1998.
- Gudmundsson, Bruce Ivar (2020), Decision-Forcing Cases (PDF), Marine Corps University, Quantico, VA.
- Hammond, J.S. (2002), Learning by the case method (PDF), HBS Publishing Division, Harvard Business School, Boston, MA
- Herreid, Clyde Freeman (2005), "Because Wisdom Can't Be Told: Using Case Studies to Teach Science", Peer Review (Winter 2005), archived from the original on 2014-11-08.
- Lundgren, Kirsten (2012), The Case Method: Art and Skill.
- McNair, Malcolm P., ed. (1954), The Case Method at the Harvard Business School: Papers by Present and Past Members of the Faculty and Staff, New York: McGraw-Hill, archived from the original on 2018-07-18 – via Questia.
- Siddiqui, Zehra (2013), How to write a case study (PDF), William Davidson Institute, University of Michigan, Ann-Arbor, MI, archived from the original (PDF) on 2015-04-21.
