= Casebook method =

Method of legal education

The casebook method, similar to but not the same as the case method, is the primary method of teaching law in law schools in the United States. It was pioneered at Harvard Law School by Christopher Columbus Langdell. It is based on the principle that rather than studying highly abstract summaries of legal rules (the technique used in most countries), the best way to learn American law is to read the actual judicial opinions which become the law under the rule of stare decisis (due to its Anglo-American common law origin).

== History and technique ==
To set up the casebook method of law study, American law professors traditionally collect the most illustrative cases concerning a particular area of the law in special textbooks called casebooks. Some professors heavily edit cases down to the most important paragraphs, while deleting nearly all citations and paraphrasing everything else; a few present all cases in full, and most others are in between. One common technique is to provide almost all of the entire text of a landmark case which created an important legal rule, followed by brief notes summarizing the holdings of other cases which further refined the rule.

Traditionally, the casebook method is coupled with the Socratic method in American law schools. For a given class, a professor will assign several cases from the casebook to read, and may also require students to be familiar with any notes following those cases. In class, the professor will ask students questions about the assigned cases to determine whether they identified and understood the correct rule from the case, if there is one—in certain heavily contested areas of the law, there will not be any one correct rule. By answering the professor's questions, "the student learns how to think like a lawyer."

A typical example in the law of contracts is Hadley v Baxendale (1854), a case that is still routinely tested on bar examinations today. Treatises designed for practicing lawyers as well as textbooks for students earning non-legal degrees (i.e., business law courses for business administration students) concisely state the famous rules announced in that case that (1) consequential damages for breach of contract are limited to those foreseen by the parties at the time of contracting, thus implying that (2) a party must notify the other up front of its specific needs in order to expand what is mutually foreseeable and thereby recover consequential damages if the other breaches. Thus stated, Hadley seems simple enough, but a casebook for a law school course will never say that. Rather, the law student must deduce those principles from the somewhat archaic text of the Court of Exchequer's mid-19th-century decision.

This teaching method differs in two ways from the teaching methods used in most other academic programs: (1) it requires students to work almost exclusively with primary source material, which can be written in obscure or obsolete language for older cases; and (2) a typical American law school class is supposed to be a dialogue about the meaning of a case, not a straightforward lecture. In turn, this case dialogue process (by publicly exposing and examining the student's understanding of the material in the company of their peers) helps students develop the psychological toughness required of professional advocates.

In some law schools, the casebook method is used in conjunction with lectures or other more structured forms of instruction. This is especially true in classes which are more heavily geared toward statutory law, such as tax law (which in the USA is governed by the Internal Revenue Code) and certain areas of commercial law (particularly courses dealing with the Uniform Commercial Code).

This method is also used in other common law countries, including Canada, Australia and New Zealand.

=== Law school outlines ===
To facilitate the casebook method of study, "law school outlines" are used as legal topic study aids. Typically, the outlines are created by law school students; however, there are professional outlines also available. An outline typically provides a concise and direct statement of legal issues in a particular area of law, organized according to the typical law school curriculum. In some cases, outlines are organized according to specific professors or courses. Outlines often remove many legal nuances and fact specific distinctions in case law to establish more generalized legal principles. Students must remember to be cautious before relying on outlines written by others found on online databases. They frequently come with copyright notices and may often be outdated. Many such sites also warn their users that relying on these outlines alone will not be sufficient to prepare for an exam and they should only be used as a supplement to the studying process.

== See also ==
- Case method
- Case study
