= First Party System =

Phase in U.S. electoral politics (1792–1824)

- 1792–1828
- United States presidential election results between 1796 and 1824. Green shaded states usually voted for the Democratic-Republican Party, while orange shaded states usually voted for the Federalist Party or Federalist affiliated candidates.

The First Party System was the political party system in the United States between roughly 1792 and 1828. It featured two national parties competing for control of the presidency, Congress, and the states: the Federalist Party, created largely by Alexander Hamilton, and the rival Jeffersonian Democratic-Republican Party, formed by Thomas Jefferson and James Madison, usually called at the time the Republican Party (which is distinct from the modern Republican Party).

The Federalists were dominant until 1800, while the Republicans were dominant after 1800. Both parties originated in national politics, but soon expanded their efforts to gain supporters and voters in every state. The Federalists, successors to the Pro-Administration faction that favored Washington's policies, appealed to the business community and had their base in the North, while the Republicans, like the Anti-Administration faction before them, relied on the planters and farmers within their base in the South and non-coastal North. By 1796, politics in every state was nearly monopolized by the two parties, with party newspapers and caucuses becoming effective tools to mobilize voters.

The Federalists promoted the financial system of Treasury Secretary Hamilton, which emphasized federal assumption of state debts, a tariff to pay off those debts, a national bank to facilitate financing, and encouragement of banking and manufacturing. The Republicans, based in the plantation South, opposed strong executive power, were hostile to a standing army and navy, demanded a strict reading of the Constitutional powers of the federal government, and strongly opposed the Hamilton financial program. Perhaps even more important was foreign policy, where the Federalists favored Britain because of its political stability and its close ties to American trade, while the Republicans admired France and the French Revolution. Jefferson was especially fearful that British aristocratic influences would undermine republicanism. Britain and France were at war from 1793 to 1815, with only one brief interruption. Official American policy was neutrality, with the Federalists hostile to France, and the Republicans hostile to Britain. The Jay Treaty of 1794 marked the decisive mobilization of the two parties and their supporters in every state. President George Washington, while officially nonpartisan, generally supported the Federalists and that party made Washington their iconic hero.

The First Party System ended during the Era of Good Feelings (1816–1824), as the Federalists shrank to a few isolated strongholds and the Democratic-Republicans lost unity. Between 1824 and 28, as the Second Party System emerged, the Democratic-Republican Party split into the Jacksonian faction, which became the modern Democratic Party in the 1830s, and the Henry Clay faction, which was absorbed by Clay's Whig Party.

== Federalists versus Anti-Federalists in 1787–88 ==
Leading nationalists, George Washington, Alexander Hamilton and Benjamin Franklin (see Annapolis Convention), called the Constitutional Convention in 1787. It drew up a new constitution that was submitted to state ratification conventions for approval, with the old Congress of the Confederation also approving the process. James Madison was the most prominent figure in the Constitutional Convention; he is often referred to as "the father of the Constitution".

An intense debate on ratification pitted the "Federalists", who supported the Constitution and were led by Madison and Hamilton, against the "Anti-Federalists", who opposed the new Constitution. The Federalists won and the Constitution was ratified. The Anti-Federalists were deeply concerned about the theoretical danger of a strong central government (like that of Britain) that someday could usurp the rights of the states. The Anti-Federalist argument influenced the drafting and eventual passage of the Bill of Rights, which the Federalists agreed to add to the Constitution.

== Washington administration (1789–1797) ==
At first, there were no parties in the nation. The framers of the Constitution did not want or expect political parties to emerge because they considered them divisive. However, during the presidency of George Washington, factions soon formed around dominant personalities such as Alexander Hamilton, the Secretary of the Treasury, and Thomas Jefferson, the Secretary of State, who opposed Hamilton's broad vision of a powerful federal government. Jefferson especially objected to Hamilton's flexible view of the Constitution, which stretched to include a national bank. Jefferson was joined by Madison in opposing the Washington administration, leading the "Anti-Administration party"; Hamilton led the informal political faction known as the "Pro-Administration party". Washington was re-elected without opposition in 1792.

Hamilton built a national network of supporters that emerged about 1792–93 as the Federalist Party. This was a somewhat different coalition from the previous Federalist group, consisting of supporters of the Constitution in 1787–1788 as well as entirely new elements, and even a few former opponents of the Constitution (such as Patrick Henry). In response, Jefferson and Madison built a rival network of supporters in Congress and in the states. Madison, who largely authored the Constitution, was a Federalist in 1787–1788, but he opposed the program of the Hamiltonians and their new Federalist Party. The group led by Jefferson and Madison emerged in 1792–93 as the Democratic-Republican Party, which included many former Anti-Federalists.

The elections of 1792 were the first contested on anything resembling a partisan basis. In most states, the congressional elections were recognized in some sense, as Jefferson strategist John Beckley put it, as a "struggle between the Treasury department and the republican interest". In New York, the race for governor was organized along these lines. The candidates were John Jay, who was a Hamiltonian, and incumbent George Clinton, who was allied with Jefferson and the Republicans.

In 1793, the first Democratic-Republican Societies were formed. They supported the French Revolution, which had just seen the execution of Louis XVI, and generally supported the Jeffersonian cause. The word "democrat" was proposed by Citizen Genêt for the societies, and the Federalists ridiculed Jefferson's friends as "democrats". After Washington denounced the societies as unrepublican, they mostly faded away.

In 1793, war broke out between England, France, and their European allies. The Jeffersonians favored France and pointed to the 1778 treaty that was still in effect. Washington and his unanimous cabinet (including Jefferson) decided the treaty did not bind the U.S. to enter the war; instead Washington proclaimed neutrality.

When war threatened with Britain in 1794, Washington sent John Jay to negotiate the Jay Treaty with Britain; it was signed in late 1794, and ratified in 1795. It averted a possible war and settled many (but not all) of the outstanding issues between the U.S. and Britain. The Jeffersonians vehemently denounced the treaty, saying it threatened to undermine republicanism by giving the aristocratic British and their Federalist allies too much influence. The fierce debates over the Jay Treaty in 1794–96, according to William Nisbet Chambers, nationalized politics and turned a faction in Congress into a nationwide party. To fight the treaty the Jeffersonians "established coordination in activity between leaders at the capital, and leaders, actives and popular followings in the states, counties and towns".

In 1796 Jefferson challenged John Adams for the presidency and lost. The Electoral College made the decision, and it was largely chosen by the state legislatures, many of which were not chosen on a national party basis.

== Newspapers as party weapons ==
Newspapers flourished in the new republic. Already by 1796, both parties sponsored national networks of locally owned papers which attracted partisan subscribers. By 1800, there were 234 being published once or twice a week, and the first dailies appeared. Between 1790 and 1820 over 400 new papers were started. Many soon merged or closed. Nationalism was a high priority, and the editors fostered an intellectual nationalism typified by the Federalist effort to stimulate a national literary culture through their clubs and publications in New York and Philadelphia, and by Noah Webster's efforts to Americanize the language inherited from England.

Newspaper content focused largely on attacks or defense of the new federal government, as well as on state and local politics. Editors directed much abuse toward opposition politicians—the fatal duel between Alexander Hamilton and Aaron Burr was incited by their own personal newspaper attacks on each other.

The most important newspapers of the 1790s-1800s were closely read by other editors and copied from. They would be read aloud and commented upon in coffee houses and taverns. Key party newspapers include:

- Gazette of the United States in Philadelphia. It was the leading Federalist newspaper, founded in 1789 and edited by John Fenno. It was a militant mouthpiece for the Federalist party and the Washington administration.
- National Gazette in Philadelphia. This was the leading Republican newspaper, founded in 1791 and edited by Philip Freneau. It was a fierce critic of the Federalists and of Washington himself. Leading Republicans contributed articles, often pseudonymously, including Madison and Jefferson. Washington was often annoyed, grousing to friends about "that Rascal Freneau.".
- Columbian Centinel. This was a prominent Federalist newspaper published in Boston, edited by Benjamin Russell. It was one of the most influential papers in New England, and its material was widely reprinted.
- National Intelligencer of Washington D.C. was the leading Republican newspaper in the South. For decades it was a major source of Congressional news.

Editors of the First Party System traded barbs both nasty and humorous. An example is this acrostic from a Republican paper. The clue is looking at the first letters of all the lines:

A sk—who lies here beneath this monument?
L o—'tis a self created MONSTER, who
E mbraced all vice. His arrogance was like
X erxes, who flogg'd the disobedient sea,
A dultery his smallest crime; when he
N obility affected. This privilege
D ecreed by Monarchs, was to that annext.
E nticing and entic'd to ev'ry fraud,
R enounced virtue, liberty and God.

H aunted by whores—he haunted them in turn
A ristocratic was this noble Goat
M onster of monsters, in pollution skill'd
I mmers'd in mischief, brothels, funds & banks
L ewd slave to lust,—afforded consolation;
T o mourning whores, and tory-lamentation.
O utdid all fools, tainted with royal name;
N one but fools, their wickedness proclaim.

The most heated rhetoric came in debates over the French Revolution, especially during the Reign of Terror of 1793–94, which saw huge numbers of executions of the revolutionary government's political opponents.

== Party strength in Congress ==
Historians have used statistical techniques to estimate the party breakdown in Congress. Many Congressmen were hard to classify in the first few years, but after 1796 there was less uncertainty. The first parties were anti-federalist and federalist.

Federalist and Democratic-Republican strength in Congress by election year
House	1788	1790	1792	1794	1796	1798	1800	1802	1804	1806
Federalist	37	39	51	47	57	60	38	39	25	24
Democratic-Republican	28	30	54	59	49	46	65	103	116	118
Democratic-Republican	43%	43%	51%	56%	46%	43%	63%	73%	82%	83%
Senate	1788	1790	1792	1794	1796	1798	1800	1802	1804	1806
Federalist	18	16	16	21	22	22	15	9	7	6
Democratic-Republican	8	13	14	11	10	10	17	25	27	28
Democratic-Republican	31%	45%	47%	34%	31%	31%	53%	74%	79%	82%

== Inventing campaign techniques ==
Given the power of the Federalists, the Democratic Republicans had to work harder to win. In Connecticut in 1806 the state leadership sent town leaders instructions for the forthcoming elections; every town manager was told by state leaders "to appoint a district manager in each district or section of his town, obtaining from each an assurance that he will faithfully do his duty". Then the town manager was instructed to compile lists and total up the number of taxpayers, the number of eligible voters, how many were "decided democratic republicans", "decided federalists", or "doubtful", and finally to count the number of supporters who were not currently eligible to vote but who might qualify (by age or taxes) at the next election. The returns eventually went to the state manager, who issued directions to laggard towns to get all the eligibles to town meetings, help the young men qualify to vote, to nominate a full ticket for local elections, and to print and distribute the party ticket. (The secret ballot did not appear for a century.) This highly coordinated "get-out-the-vote" drive would be familiar to modern political campaigners, but was the first of its kind in world history.

The Jeffersonians invented many campaign techniques that the Federalists later adopted and that became standard American practice. They were especially effective at building a network of newspapers in major cities to broadcast their statements and editorialize in their favor. But the Federalists, with a strong base among merchants, controlled more newspapers: in 1796 the Federalist papers outnumbered the Democratic Republicans by 4 to 1. Every year more papers began publishing; in 1800 the Federalists still had a 2 to 1 numerical advantage. Most papers, on each side, were weeklies with a circulation of 300 to 1000. Jefferson systematically subsidized the editors. Fisher Ames, a leading Federalist, who used the term "Jacobin" to link Jefferson's followers to the terrorists of the French Revolution, blamed the newspapers for electing Jefferson, seeing them as "an overmatch for any Government ... The Jacobins owe their triumph to the unceasing use of this engine; not so much to skill in use of it as by repetition." Historians echo Ames' assessment. As one explains,

It was the good fortune of the Republicans to have within their ranks a number of highly gifted political manipulators and propagandists. Some of them had the ability ... to not only see and analyze the problem at hand but to present it in a succinct fashion; in short, to fabricate the apt phrase, to coin the compelling slogan and appeal to the electorate on any given issue in language it could understand.

Outstanding phrasemakers included editor William Duane, party leaders Albert Gallatin and Thomas Cooper, and Jefferson himself. Meanwhile, John J. Beckley of Pennsylvania, an ardent partisan, invented new campaign techniques (such as mass distribution of pamphlets and of handwritten ballots) that generated the grass-roots support and unprecedented levels of voter turnout for the Jeffersonians.

== War threats with Britain and France ==
With the world thrown into global warfare after 1793, the small nation on the fringe of the European system could barely remain neutral. The Jeffersonians called for strong measures against Britain, and even for another war. The Federalists tried to avert war by the Jay Treaty (1795) with England. The treaty became highly controversial when the Jeffersonians denounced it as a sell-out to Britain, even as the Federalists said it avoided war, reduced the Indian threat, created good trade relations with the world's foremost economic power, and ended lingering disputes from the Revolutionary War. When Jefferson came to power in 1801 he honored the treaty, but new disputes with Britain led to the War of 1812.

In 1798 disputes with France led to the Quasi-War (1798–1800), an undeclared naval war involving the navies and merchant ships of both countries. Democratic-Republicans said France really wanted peace, but the XYZ Affair undercut their position. Warning that full-scale war with France was imminent, Hamilton and his "High Federalist" allies forced the issue by getting Congressional approval to raise a large new army (which Hamilton controlled), replete with officers' commissions (which he bestowed on his partisans). The Alien and Sedition Acts (1798) clamped down on dissenters, including pro-Jefferson editors, and Vermont Congressman Matthew Lyon, who won re-election while in jail in 1798. In the Kentucky and Virginia Resolutions (1798), secretly drafted by Madison and Jefferson, the legislatures of the two states challenged the power of the federal government.

=== National debt ===
Jefferson and Albert Gallatin focused on the danger that the public debt, unless it was paid off, would be a threat to republican values. They were appalled that Hamilton was increasing the national debt and using it to solidify his Federalist base. Gallatin was the Republican Party's chief expert on fiscal issues and as Treasury Secretary under Jefferson and Madison worked hard to lower taxes and lower the debt, while at the same time paying cash for the Louisiana Purchase and funding the War of 1812. Burrows says of Gallatin:

His own fears of personal dependency and his small-shopkeeper's sense of integrity, both reinforced by a strain of radical republican thought that originated in England a century earlier, convinced him that public debts were a nursery of multiple public evils—corruption, legislative impotence, executive tyranny, social inequality, financial speculation, and personal indolence. Not only was it necessary to extinguish the existing debt as rapidly as possible, he argued, but Congress would have to ensure against the accumulation of future debts by more diligently supervising government expenditures.

Andrew Jackson saw the national debt as a "national curse" and he took special pride in paying off the entire national debt in 1835.

== Jefferson and the revolution of 1800 ==
In an analysis of the contemporary party system, Jefferson wrote on February 12, 1798:

Two political Sects have arisen within the U. S. the one believing that the executive is the branch of our government which the most needs support; the other that like the analogous branch in the English Government, it is already too strong for the republican parts of the Constitution; and therefore in equivocal cases they incline to the legislative powers: the former of these are called federalists, sometimes aristocrats or monocrats, and sometimes Tories, after the corresponding sect in the English Government of exactly the same definition: the latter are styled republicans, Whigs, jacobins, anarchists, dis-organizers, etc. these terms are in familiar use with most persons.

Madison worked diligently to form party lines inside the Congress and build coalitions with sympathetic political factions in each state. In 1800, a critical election galvanized the electorate, sweeping the Federalists out of power, and electing Jefferson and his Democratic-Republican Party. Adams made a few last minute, "midnight appointments", notably Federalist John Marshall as Chief Justice. Marshall held the post for three decades and used it to federalize the Constitution, much to Jefferson's dismay.

As president, Jefferson worked to cleanse the government of Adams's "midnight appointments", withholding the commissions of 25 of 42 appointed judges and removing army officers. The sense that the nation needed two rival parties to balance each other had not been fully accepted by either party; Hamilton had viewed Jefferson's election as the failure of the Federalist experiment. The rhetoric of the day was cataclysmic — election of the opposition meant the enemy would ruin the nation. Jefferson's foreign policy was not exactly pro-Napoleon, but it applied pressure on Britain to stop impressment of American sailors and other hostile acts. By engineering an embargo of trade against Britain, Jefferson and Madison plunged the nation into economic depression, ruined much of the business of Federalist New England, and finally precipitated the War of 1812 with a much larger and more powerful foe.

The Federalists vigorously criticized the government, and gained strength in the industrial Northeast. However, they committed a major blunder in 1814. That year the semi-secret "Hartford Convention" passed resolutions that verged on secession; their publication ruined the Federalist party. It had been limping along for years, with strength in New England and scattered eastern states but practically no strength in the West. While Federalists helped invent or develop numerous campaign techniques (such as the first national nominating conventions in 1808), their elitist bias alienated the middle class, thus allowing the Jeffersonians to claim they represented the true spirit of "republicanism".

== State parties ==
Because of the importance of foreign policy (decided by the national government), of the sale of national lands, and the patronage controlled by the President, the factions in each state realigned themselves in parallel with the Federalists and Republicans. Some newspaper editors became powerful politicians, such as Thomas Ritchie, whose "Richmond Junto" controlled Virginia state politics from 1808 into the 1840s.

New England was always the stronghold of the Federalist party. One historian explains how well organized it was in Connecticut:

It was only necessary to perfect the working methods of the organized body of office-holders who made up the nucleus of the party. There were the state officers, the assistants, and a large majority of the Assembly. In every county there was a sheriff with his deputies. All of the state, county, and town judges were potential and generally active workers. Every town had several justices of the peace, school directors and, in Federalist towns, all the town officers who were ready to carry on the party's work ... Militia officers, state's attorneys, lawyers, professors and schoolteachers were in the van of this "conscript army". In all, about a thousand or eleven hundred dependent officer-holders were described as the inner ring which could always be depended upon for their own and enough more votes within their control to decide an election. This was the Federalist machine.

Religious tensions polarized Connecticut, as the established Congregational Church, in alliance with the Federalists, tried to maintain its grip on power. Dissenting groups moved toward the Jeffersonians. The failure of the Hartford Convention in 1814 mortally wounded the Federalists, who were finally upended by the Democratic-Republicans in 1817.

== Era of Good Feelings ==
The First Party System was primarily built around foreign policy issues that vanished with the defeat of Napoleon and the compromise settlement of the War of 1812. Furthermore, the fears that Federalists were plotting to reintroduce aristocracy dissipated. Thus an "Era of Good Feelings" under James Monroe replaced the high-tension politics of the First Party System about 1816. Personal politics and factional disputes were occasionally still hotly debated, but Americans no longer thought of themselves in terms of political parties.

Historians have debated the exact ending of the system. Most concluded it petered out by 1820. The little state of Delaware, largely isolated from the larger political forces controlling the nation, saw the First Party System continue well into the 1820s, with the Federalists occasionally winning some offices. Others consider the 1824 United States presidential election and the ensuing Corrupt Bargain as the end of the Era of Good Feelings.

== Historiography ==
=== Legitimacy of a party system ===
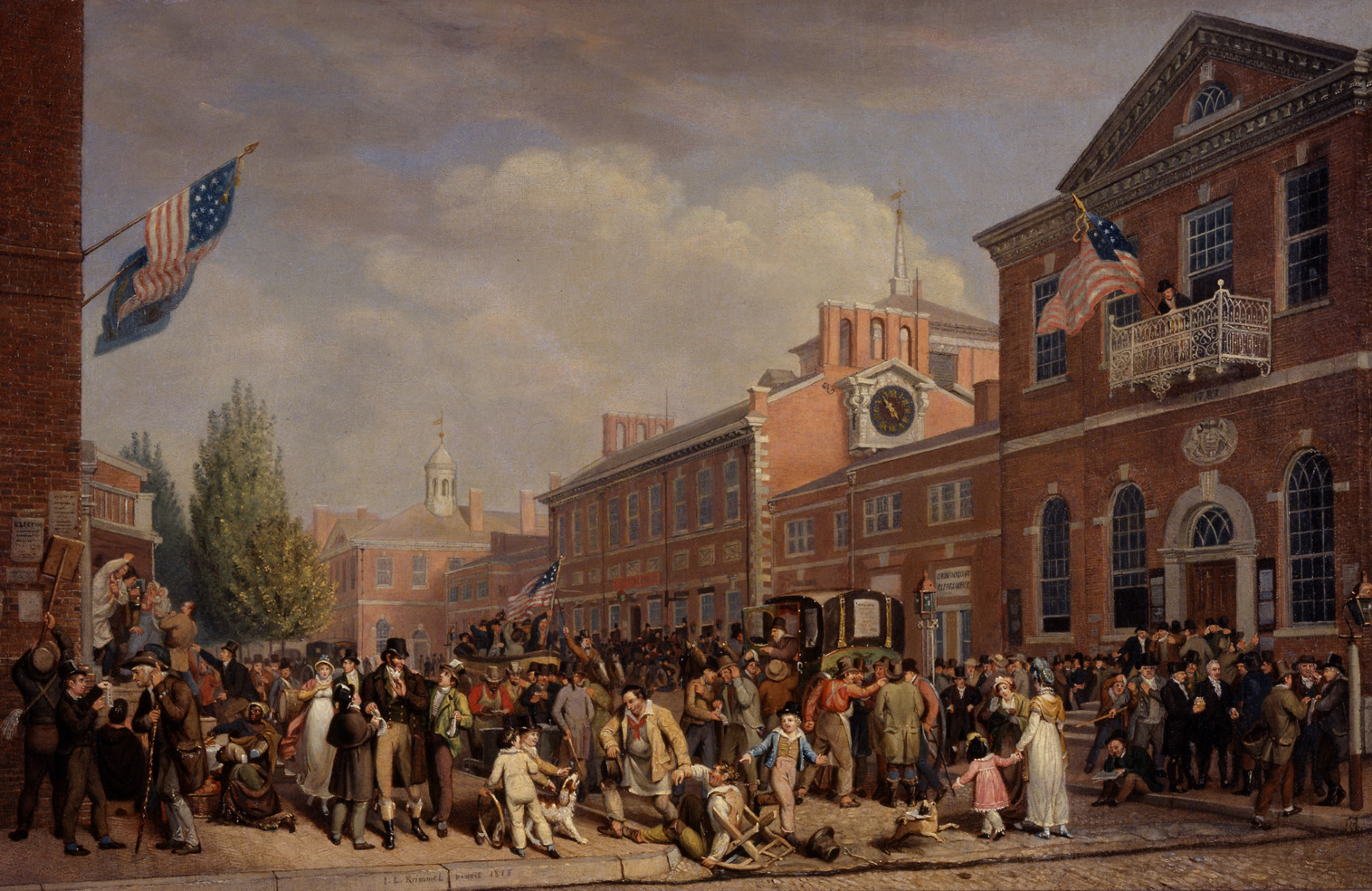
Depiction of election-day activities in Philadelphia by John Lewis Krimmel, 1815

Alexander Hamilton felt that only by mobilizing its supporters on a daily basis in every state on many issues could support for the government be sustained through thick and thin. Newspapers were needed to communicate inside the party; patronage helped the party's leaders and made new friends.

Hamilton, and especially Washington, distrusted the idea of an opposition party, as shown in George Washington's Farewell Address of 1796. They thought opposition parties would only weaken the nation. By contrast Jefferson was the main force behind the creation and continuity of an opposition party. He deeply felt the Federalists represented aristocratic forces hostile to true republicanism and the true will of the people, as he explained in a letter to Henry Lee in 1824:

Men by their constitutions are naturally divided into two parties: 1. Those who fear and distrust the people, and wish to draw all powers from them into the hands of the higher classes. 2. Those who identify themselves with the people, have confidence in them, cherish and consider them as the most honest and safe, although not the most wise depositary of the public interests. In every country these two parties exist, and in every one where they are free to think, speak, and write, they will declare themselves. Call them, therefore, liberals and serviles, Jacobins and Ultras, whigs and tories, republicans and federalists, aristocrats and democrats, or by whatever name you please, they are the same parties still and pursue the same object. The last appellation of aristocrats and democrats is the true one expressing the essence of all.

Hofstadter (1970) shows it took many years for the idea to take hold that having two parties is better than having one, or none. That transition was made possible by the successful passing of power in 1801 from one party to the other. Although Jefferson systematically identified Federalist army officers and officeholders, he was blocked from removing all of them by protests from Republicans. The Quids complained he did not go far enough.

=== Jefferson and Hamilton ===
Well into the 20th century Jefferson was the hero for scholars, and Hamilton the villain. Jefferson's reputation has declined sharply, primarily because of his role as a major slaveowner. Hamilton has risen; Princeton historian Sean Wilentz in 2010 identified a scholarly trend very much in Hamilton's favor—although Wilentz himself dissented and still admires Jefferson more:

In recent years, Hamilton and his reputation have decidedly gained the initiative among scholars who portray him as the visionary architect of the modern liberal capitalist economy and of a dynamic federal government headed by an energetic executive. Jefferson and his allies, by contrast, have come across as naïve, dreamy idealists. At best according to many historians, the Jeffersonians were reactionary utopians who resisted the onrush of capitalist modernity in hopes of turning America into a yeoman farmers' arcadia. At worst, they were proslavery racists who wish to rid the West of Indians, expand the empire of slavery, and keep political power in local hands – all the better to expand the institution of slavery and protect slaveholders' rights to own human property."

== See also ==
- Federalist Era
- Party systems in the United States
- List of United States House of Representatives elections (1789–1822)
- American election campaigns in the 19th century
- History of the United States (1789–1849)
- Political history in the United States, for historiography
- List of United States political catchphrases, slogans and rhetoric
