= Relationship of Alexander Hamilton and Thomas Jefferson =

The relationship of Alexander Hamilton and Thomas Jefferson started when the pair joined the cabinet of George Washington. Hamilton and Jefferson eventually came into conflict because their beliefs on government conflicted with each other. Since their deaths, Hamilton and Jefferson have generally been seen as personifications of their beliefs, with people overlooking the pair's personalities when referring to their conflict and the public's view on the conflict shifting based on what is currently in the cultural zeitgeist.

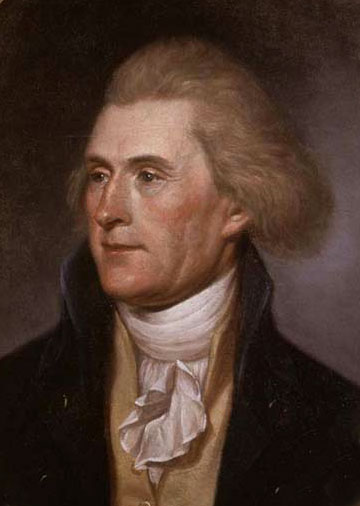
Jefferson in 1791

Hamilton in 1792

== History ==
Before George Washington appointed the pair to his cabinet, Hamilton and Jefferson were not familiar with each other. Throughout the first year in Washington's cabinet, the pair shared a cordial relationship, though their views on government clashed. Hamilton saw cities as foundational to society and necessary for wealth creation, while Jefferson believed centralized government would lead to tyranny and instead wished for a country of farmers, seeing cities as “great sores.” Washington had partially contributed to their conflict by leaving both men with an exaggerated idea of their authority, which eventually led to personal conflict.

Jefferson was first made suspicious by Hamilton's financial plan, a feeling which solidified when he learned of Hamilton's proposal for a government modeled after the British system at the Constitutional Convention. Jefferson began to see Hamilton as a threat to his views on central government, believing that the Central Bank proposed by Hamilton's financial plan was unconstitutional. Jefferson also saw Hamilton as trying to replicate what he saw as the evils of Europe, specifically regarding social structures. Jefferson responded to this by forming the Democratic-Republican Party, and hiring Philip Freneau to found the National Gazette. Furthermore, Jefferson denounced Hamilton's actions to Washington; Jefferson claimed that Hamilton called the Constitution a “shilly shally thing” and that Hamilton wanted to restore monarchy in America.

On February 15, 1791, Jefferson sent a letter to Washington expressing constitutional concerns about Hamilton's planned national bank, believing that the federal government had no place regulating the internal commerce of states with a bank, and asking for a presidential veto. After reading Jefferson's letter, Washington gave Hamilton a response to the criticism. In his response, Hamilton outlined his doctrine of implied powers, that the federal government could do things that were granted implicitly by the powers given to them under the Constitution. Washington sided with Hamilton, who Washington thought would bring the country to a financially better place.

Hamilton responded by forming the Federalist Party and by denying Jefferson's claim that Hamilton wanted to bring monarchy back to America. Hamilton also told Washington that Jefferson was a threat to his economic plan. In 1792, Washington wrote letters to Hamilton and Jefferson to ask them to work together. Despite their differences, Hamilton and Jefferson called for Washington to serve a second term when Washington spoke of retiring and wanted America to remain neutral in the French Revolution Wars. Hamilton and Jefferson came to a compromise at a dinner on June 20, 1790, where Hamilton got his national bank and Jefferson got the capitol of the United States moved to the proposed Washington D.C.. This was later known as the Compromise of 1790. Jefferson claimed that he was tricked in this deal, and believed that it was one of the worst deals he ever made.

Jefferson retired from Washington's cabinet in 1794. Hamilton didn't believe that the retirement would last long. During the next three years, the pair didn't speak much with or on each other. Neither spoke on either of their scandals during this period. In 1796, Jefferson ran for the presidency, and Hamilton's party, the Federalists, called him a hypocrite for it. When Hamilton commanded a large army that Congress ordered, Jefferson called Hamilton “our Buonaparte.”

In the election of 1800, Hamilton was too focused on ensuring the defeat of John Adams to pay any mind to Jefferson. When the election ended in a tie between Aaron Burr and Jefferson, Hamilton threw his support behind Jefferson, seeing Jefferson as the better of two evils. After Hamilton's death, Jefferson spoke well of him.

== Legacy ==
The Imaginative Conservative stated that the conflicts of Americas first decade were symbolized by Hamilton and Jefferson. John Ferling stated in his book, Jefferson and Hamilton: The Rivalry That Forged a Nation that Hamilton and Jefferson were the most important people in the shaping of the United States of America. The public views on Hamilton and Jefferson have swayed throughout American history based on what is currently happening in the country. Jeffery Rosen has noted how modern political parties partially mimicked the Jefferson v. Hamilton conflicts of early American politics. Historians have generally overlooked the Hamilton and Jefferson's personalities when analyzing controversies between the pair.

Hamilton and Jefferson's relationship was a primary plot point of Hamilton: An American Musical (2015). A false quote attributed to Hamilton to Jefferson has spread across Facebook. The Atlantic notes how the musical reframes Hamilton as the man of the people and Jefferson as a monarchist, which is the opposite of how history in America is commonly seen.

== See also ==
- Bibliography of Alexander Hamilton § Jefferson and Hamilton
