= John Fenno =

American newspaper publisher

John Fenno (Aug. 12, 1751 (O.S.) – Sept. 14, 1798) was a Federalist Party editor among early American publishers and major figure in the history of American newspapers. His Gazette of the United States played a major role in shaping the beginnings of party politics in the United States in the 1790s.

== Early life ==
Fenno was born in Boston, the son of Ephraim Fenno, a leather dresser and alehouse keeper, and Mary Chapman. His ancestors had inhabited Massachusetts since the early 1600s. He attended the Old South Writing School, a free public school.

== Career ==
In 1769, Fenno became a teacher at his alma mater. Having experienced the events leading up to the American Revolution in Boston, he abandoned his teaching career to join the rebel military. He served as an orderly to General Artemas Ward.

Failure of an import business led to a move to New York City, which at that time was the nation's capital. Having previously written for the Massachusetts Centinel, Fenno on April 11, 1789 in New York City published the first issue of the Gazette of the United States to support Federalist Party positions. Fenno moved it to Philadelphia when the national capital moved there in 1790.

As opposing factions, centered on Alexander Hamilton and Thomas Jefferson, developed within President Washington's administration, political newspapers such as the Gazette became increasingly important. Fenno's little three-column folio, printed on a sheet seventeen by twenty-one inches, became the semi-official government newspaper, with a share of the government's printing and with contributions from prominent Federalists such as John Adams. Hamilton was especially active, writing articles under various pseudonyms and rescuing the editor from bankruptcy in 1793 by raising $2,000 to pay off creditors.

Jefferson and his colleagues, angry at Fenno's attempt "to make way for a king, lords, and Commons" set up rival newspapers, the Aurora edited by Benjamin F. Bache and the National Gazette edited by Philip Freneau, to promote the newly formed Democratic-Republican Party. As a highly visible Federalist spokesman, Fenno was engaged in verbal disputes that once led to fisticuffs with Bache. The tone of the Gazette of the United States was somewhat above the average of its contemporaries, and the Federalists were well served through its columns, although the circulation never exceeded 1,400. Copies circulated to major cities where other Federalist newspapers freely copied the news and editorials.

After his death in 1798 from yellow fever, his son, John Ward Fenno, carried on with the paper until it was sold in 1800.

== Personal life ==
On May 8, 1777, he wed Mary Curtis, of Roxbury, Massachusetts, and the couple had thirteen children, including:

- John Ward Fenno
- Harriet Fenno (d. 1808), who married John Rodman and they had a daughter
- Maria Fenno (1781–1823), who married New York Attorney General Josiah Ogden Hoffman on August 7, 1802. Their son was Charles Fenno Hoffman (1806–1884).
- Mary Eliza Fenno (d. 1817), who married Gulian C. Verplanck in 1811. They had two sons before her death in 1817 in Paris, where she was buried at the Père Lachaise Cemetery.

Fenno, along with his wife and a newborn daughter, died in Philadelphia during the yellow fever epidemic of 1798.

== See also ==
- First Party System

Other colonial printers:

- Jane Aitken
- Cornelia Smith Bradford
- Benjamin Franklin
- William Goddard (publisher)
- David Hall (publisher)
- John Holt (publisher)
- William Parks (publisher)
- Elizabeth Timothy

== Bibliography ==
- Burns, Eric (2006). Infamous Scribblers: The Founding Fathers and the Rowdy Beginnings of American Journalism. PublicAffairs. ISBN 978-1-58648-334-0.
- Daniel, Marcus Leonard (2009). "John Fenno and the Constitution of a National Character". Scandal and Civility: Journalism and the Birth of American Democracy. Oxford University Press. pp. 19–61. ISBN 978-0-19-517212-6.
- Humphrey, Carol Sue (1996). Startt, James D.; Sloan, Wm. David (eds.). The Press of the Young Republic. The History of American Journalism. Vol. 2. Greenwood Press. ISBN 978-0-313-28406-9.
- Knudson, Jerry W. (2006). Jefferson and the Press: Crucible of Liberty. University of South Carolina Press. ISBN 978-1-57003-607-1.
- McCormick, Thomas Denton (1931). "Fenno, John". In Johnson, Allen; Malone, Dumas (eds.). Dictionary Of American Biography. Vol. 6. New York: Charles Scribner's Sons. p. 325.
- Mott, Frank Luther (1950) [1941]. American Journalism: A History of Newspapers in the United States through 250 Years, 1690–1940 (revised ed.). The Macmillan Company.
- Pasley, Jeffrey L. (2000). Shields, David S. (ed.). "The Two National 'Gazettes': Newspapers and the Embodiment of American Political Parties". Early American Literature. 35 (1). University of North Carolina Press: 51–86. JSTOR 25057179.

=== Primary sources ===
- Cox, Rob S. (ed.). Fenno-Hoffman Family Papers – notes. University of Michigan.
- Fenno, John; Fenno, John Ward (1979). Hench, John B. (ed.). "Letters of John Fenno and John Ward Fenno, 1779–1800" (PDF). Proceedings of the American Antiquarian Society. Part I: 1779–1799. 89 (2): 299–368.
- Fenno, John; Fenno, John Ward (1979). Hench, John B. (ed.). "Letters of John Fenno and John Ward Fenno, 1779–1800" (PDF). Proceedings of the American Antiquarian Society. Part II: 1792–1800. 90 (2): 163–234.
