= Gazette of the United States =

American newspaper (1789–1818)

- He that is not for us, is against us
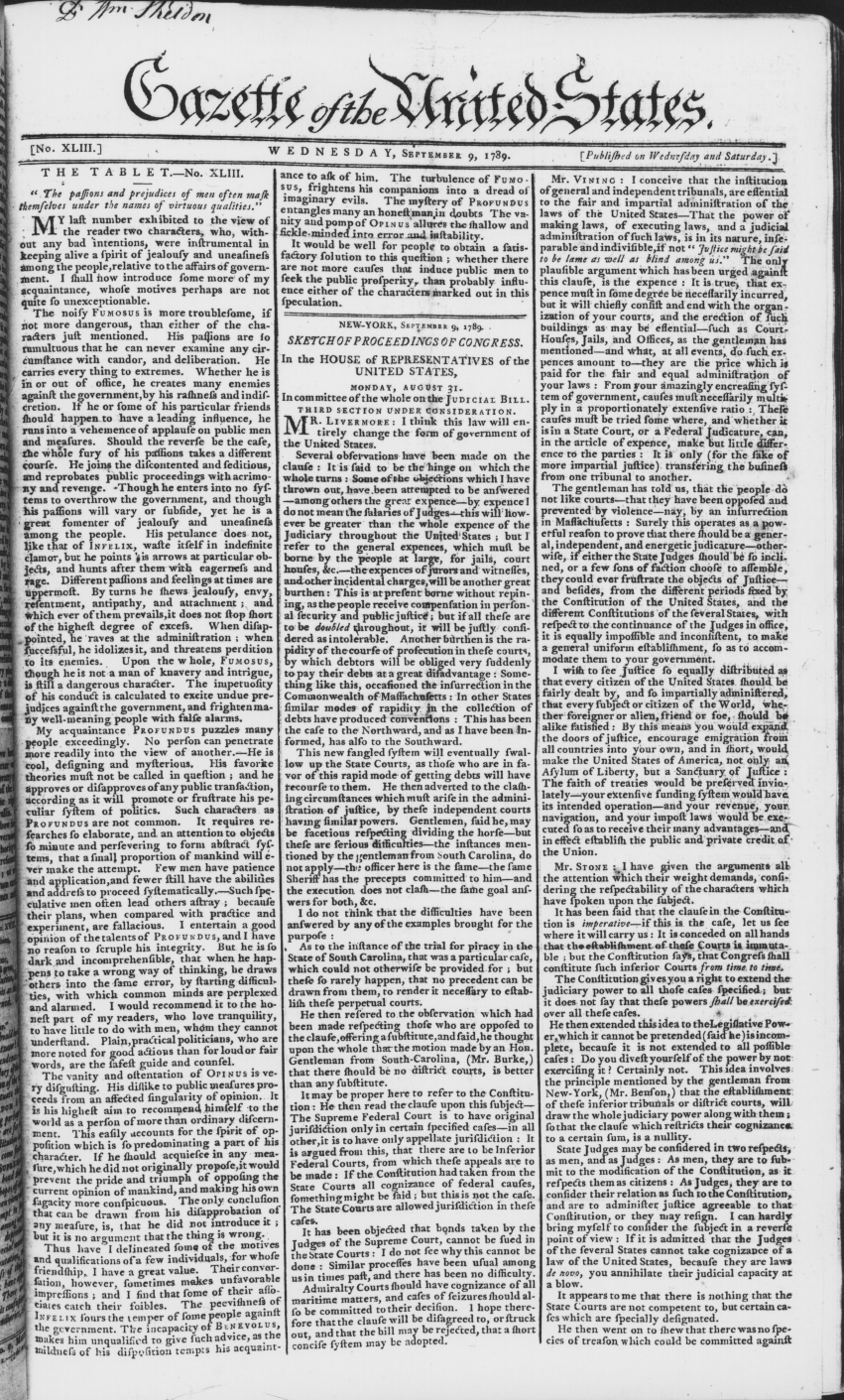
- September 9, 1789 issue
- Type: Semiweekly newspaper (1789–1793); daily (1793–1818)
- Founder: John Fenno
- Editor: John Fenno (1789–1798); John Ward Fenno with Joseph Dennie (1798–1800); Caleb P. Wayne (1800–1801); Enos Bronson (1801–1804); Several others (1804–1818)
- Founded: April 15, 1789
- Ceased publication: March 7, 1818
- Political alignment: Federalist
- City: New York (1789–1791); Philadelphia (1791–1818)
- Country: United States
- Readership: Americans nationwide
- ISSN: 2474-0942
- OCLC number: 9529277

The Gazette of the United States was an early American newspaper, first issued semiweekly in New York City on April 15, 1789, but moving the next year to Philadelphia when the nation's capital moved there the next year. It was friendly to the Federalist Party. Its founder, John Fenno, intended it to unify the country under its new government. As the leading Federalist newspaper of its time, it praised the Washington and Adams administrations and their policies. Its Federalist sponsors, chiefly Alexander Hamilton, granted it substantial funding; because some of it was directly from the government, the Gazette is considered to have been semi-official. The influence of the newspaper inspired the creation of the National Gazette and the Philadelphia Aurora, rival newspapers for the Democratic-Republicans.

Throughout its history, the Gazette was renamed multiple times. (Note: The formatting of the name also regularly changed, such as in a change of punctuation. For detailed information on the many names of the newspaper, consult the online Chronicling America, published by the Library of Congress.) Starting from 1798, the ownership and editorship of Fenno's newspaper passed between multiple people. The influence of the newspaper declined around this time, but it continued to print until March 7, 1818, consolidating into another newspaper.

== History ==
When the government of the Constitution was established, there was no strong pro-Federalist newspaper in New York, then the capital city of the country. Some commercial newspapers at this time supported the Federalists, but politics was a side topic for them. The party's leaders wanted a robust, distinctively political newspaper to advance their cause.

John Fenno was a businessman and schoolmaster from Boston, with prior experience in journalism. As a supporter of the new Constitution, he envisioned a national, authoritative newspaper that would promote the new administration in order to unify the new country. Fenno's vision attracted Federalists as sponsors such as Christopher Gore, Secretary of the Treasury Alexander Hamilton, and Senator Rufus King. Fenno later adopted the partisan motto, "He that is not for us, is against us".

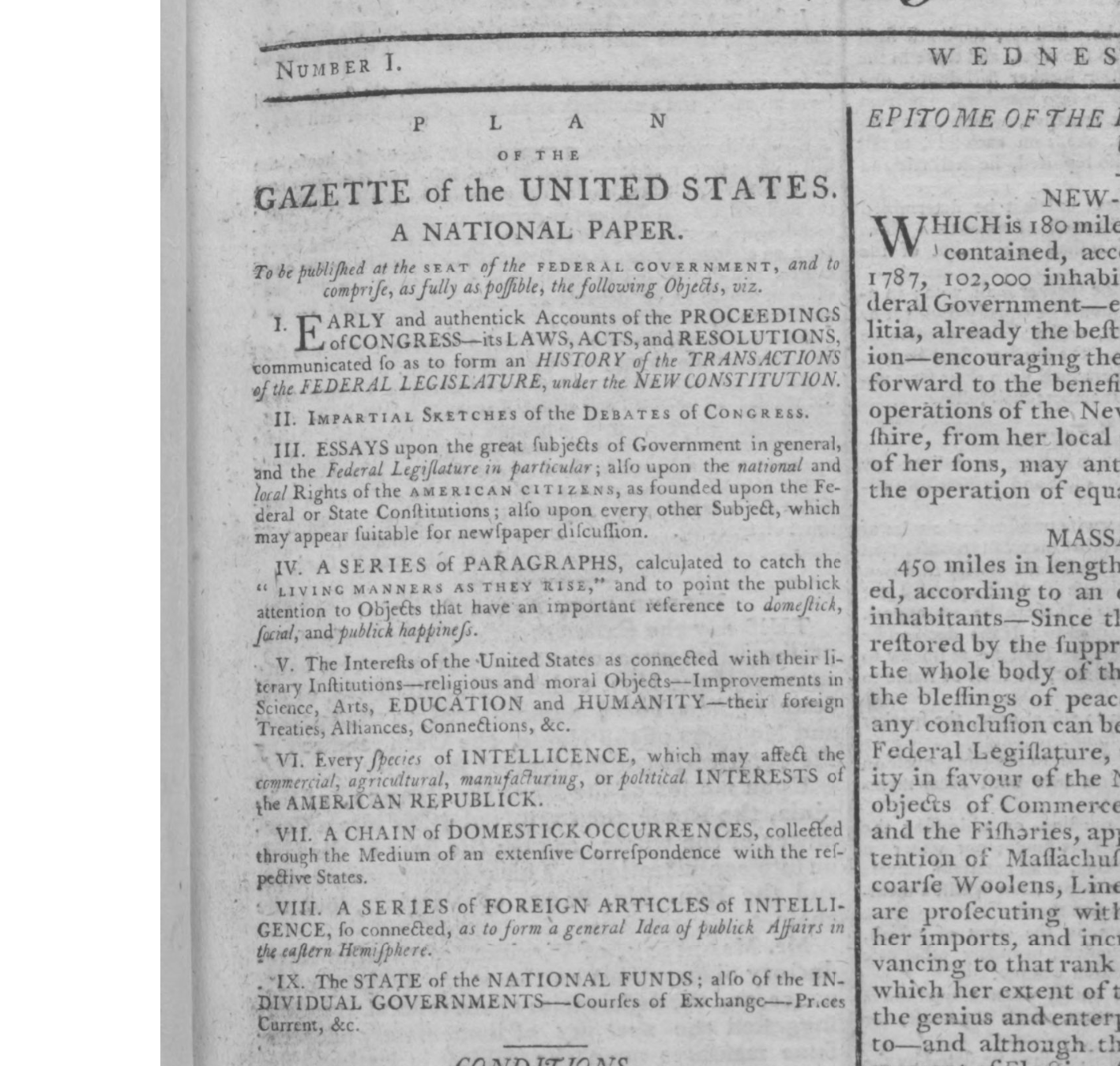
The first issue of the newspaper (April 15, 1789) explains the intentions of its founder and editor John Fenno.

Aside from his political goal, Fenno also founded the Gazette as a promising commercial opportunity, expecting to retire wealthy in ten years. He planned to secure printing contracts with the government and subcontract the printing of his newspaper. Unusually for a newspaper, the Gazette did not publish advertisements because Fenno did not want to suggest ties to a local region and felt that advertising would be beneath the dignity of his work. It also did not offer general printing services.

Fenno moved to New York to start publishing his newspaper. While his sponsors had sent him to the capital with substantial funding, Fenno initially struggled to start printing the Gazette. No printer in New York would agree to a subcontract, and Fenno had to hire former colleague John Russell to print the paper. Sponsors provided little aid when Fenno wanted more. On April 15, 1789, the Gazette of the United States finally started printing as a semiweekly newspaper, just in time for President Washington's inauguration later the same month.

The paper's first government printing contract was signed in July 1789, later than expected. John Fenno began to fall into debt as the year progressed. With a top circulation of 1,400 copies, his project did not meet his expectation for commercial success. 400 of the subscribers avoided paying, and awaited contracts were made too slowly. The business could not make up its own operating costs or support Fenno's family, not to mention the loans it needed to begin. Supposedly enthusiastic sponsors still did not offer enough help. Thus he was forced to include advertising in November. In 1790, the business moved to Philadelphia, which had been declared the new capital city.

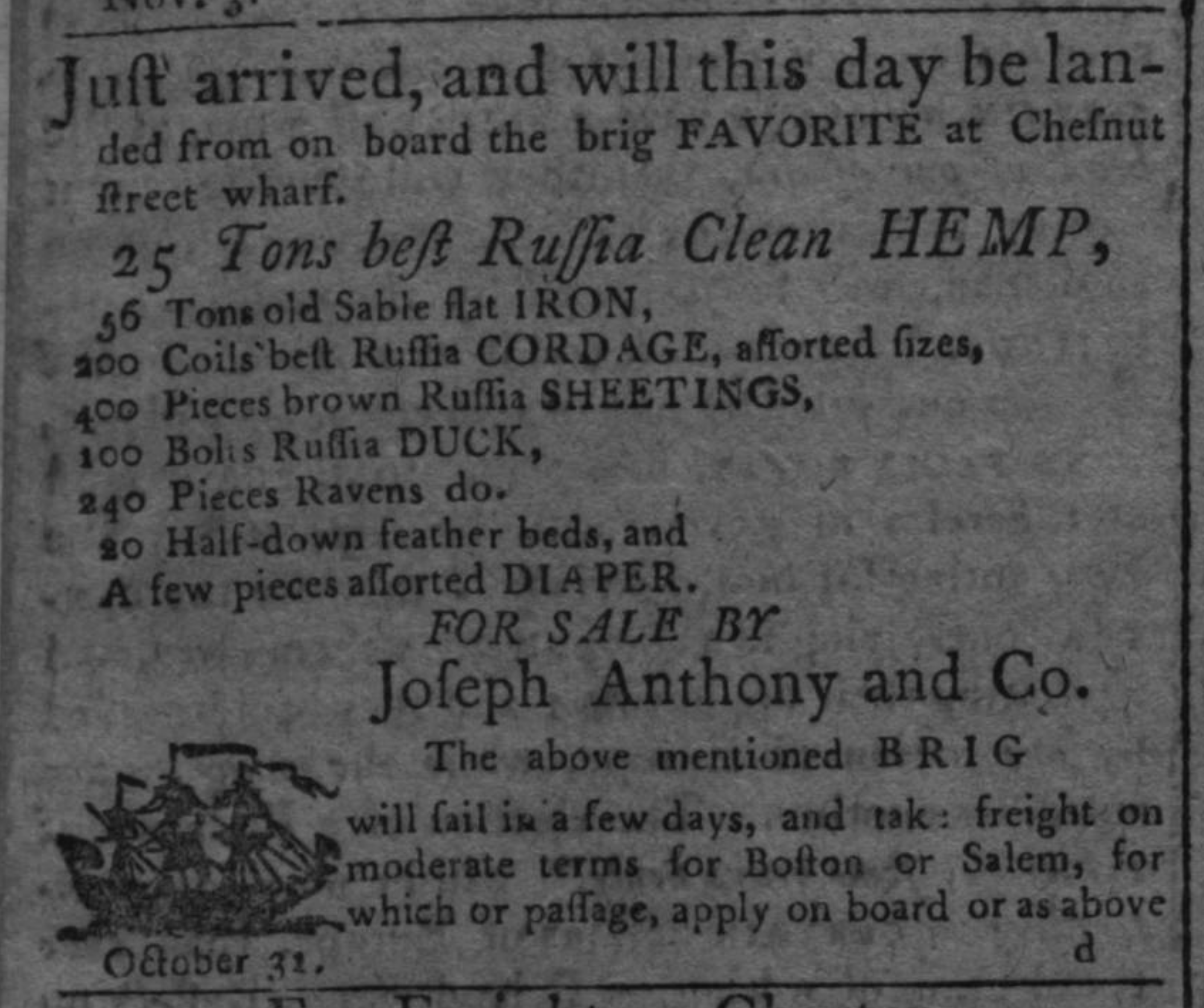
An advertisement from November 8, 1796. Although John Fenno did not want to publish advertisements in his newspaper, he was forced to accept them because he was struggling financially.

In the face of newfound opposition, Federalists in the government gave aid to the struggling newspaper. Hamilton gifted a grant to Fenno in 1790 and 1791, and Fenno also received control of the Senate's and most of the Department of Treasury's printing business. Although Fenno's wish for his Gazette to become official was never fulfilled, it did receive semi-official status through his government job. Even after the grants, Fenno's debt continued to grow until 1793, when he stopped the publication of the Gazette on September 18, 1793, amid the yellow fever epidemic. After a request from Fenno, Hamilton and Rufus King raised an amount of money about equal to Fenno's debt. On December 11, 1793, the newspaper started printing again, a now daily publication, excluding Sundays. Like other urban newspapers, it offered printing services to paying customers and avoided subcontracts.

=== Decline ===
After John Fenno died in September 1798 from yellow fever, his son John Ward took over the newspaper until 1800. Joseph Dennie was an editorial assistant and produced, to Frank Luther Mott, a "strong literary flavor". In 1800, the capital moved to Washington, but the Gazette did not move while the influence of itself and the Federalist Party waned. In 1800, Caleb P. Wayne bought the newspaper and took the editorship. Enos Bronson was the owner and editor from 1801 to 1804; under him, several libel lawsuits were brought against the United States Gazette, as it was now known. Thenceforth, the Gazette passed under several managers and editors until its last issue was printed on March 7, 1818, when it merged with the True American. The combined paper was eventually consolidated into The North American in 1847.

== Content ==
The Gazette printed news, letters, and political essays as a three-column folio. Literature and poetry were published with political themes. Prominent politicians contributed essays, such as John Adams and Alexander Hamilton. It also printed government works through federal contracts such as the law. Sometimes, Fenno would publish a letter or poem about a non-political subject.

The Gazette supported the political philosophy of the Federalist Party in an era with intense partisan conflict. Federalist policy preferences included government support for manufacturing and a national bank. Fenno was determined to persuade his readers by a wide variety of means. Readers found elaborate descriptions of the ceremonies of officials such as President George Washington and then-Vice President John Adams. Eric Burns has found only one instance of criticizing Alexander Hamilton in the history of Fenno's editorship, in the publication of an anonymous letter to Fenno, but no evident reason to do so; that "may be the only example from the entire era of any avowedly factional newspaper sniping at its own viewpoint, however briefly."

Opponents of the Federalist agenda were heavily criticized. Official documents were selectively published to look favorable to the Federalists, even falsified. In response to the Jay Treaty (1795), the Gazette urged the treaty's detractors to cease their criticism to avoid "subvert[ing] all governance, and introduc[ing] anarchy and confusion"; never again would the newspaper demand for dissent to be silenced fully. Despite the Gazette's effusive praise of Washington, he hardly ever commented about the friendly newspaper and even criticized Fenno once for partisan reporting.

Fenno regulated his newspaper's partisanship by not discussing elections much. Partly because he opposed the principle of democratic election itself, he expressed general support for incumbents and opposition to challengers, but did not discuss his partisan views in elections. He did not consider himself a partisan editor or political figure, but rather a defender of legitimate authority in the national interest. In his private correspondence, he expressed contempt for the opponents of the Federalists.

== Controversy and rivalry ==
=== National Gazette ===
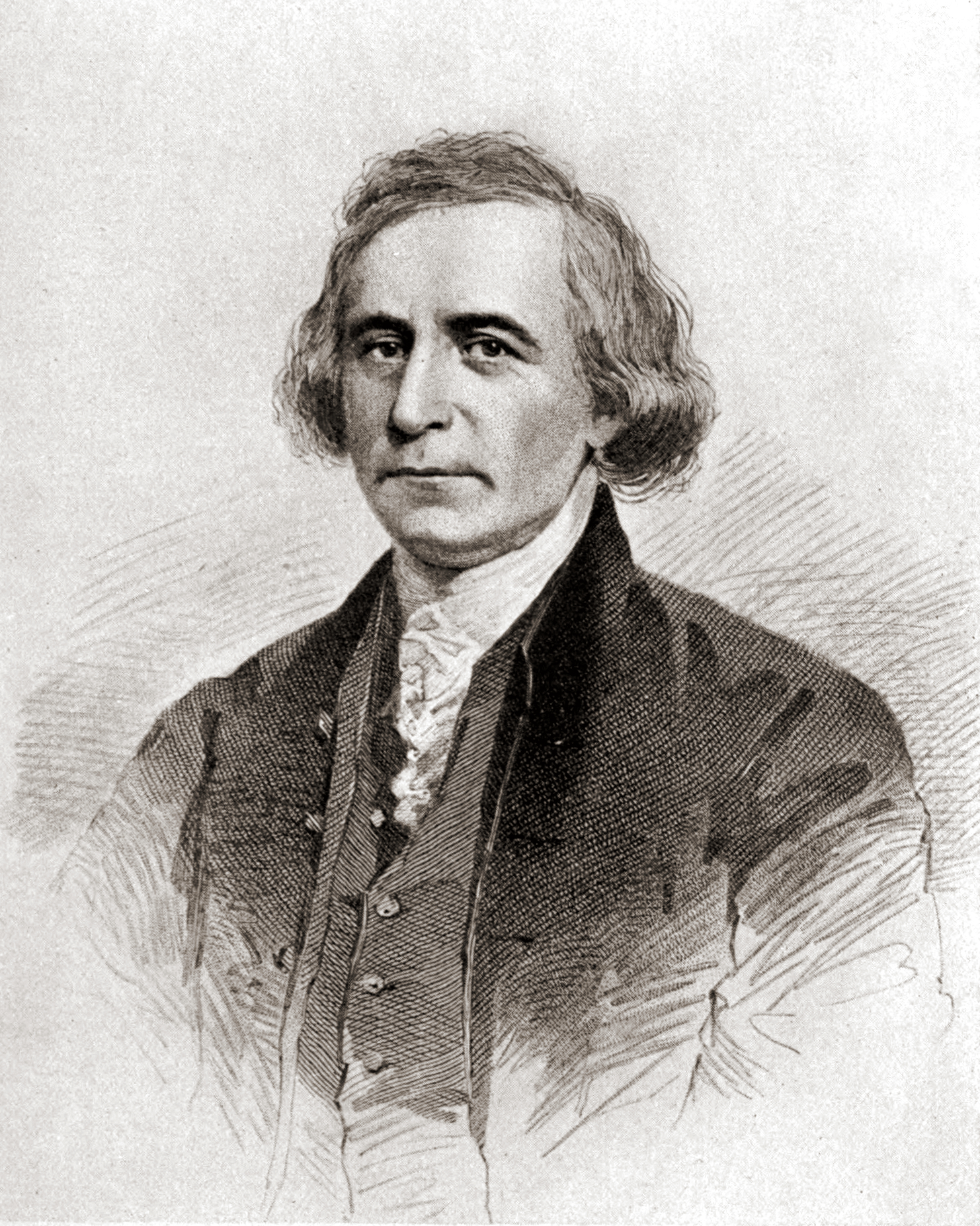
Philip Freneau was John Fenno's rival newspaper editor.

Democratic-Republicans, who opposed Hamilton's fiscal policy, objected to the increasing partisanship of the Gazette of the United States. To them, the Gazette was alike to a government-sponsored newspaper in Britain, promoting a British-style government. Essays published by Fenno such as Discourses on Davila by John Adams and Publicola by John Quincy Adams were charged with advocating monarchy and aristocracy. In the words of Thomas Jefferson, Fenno's Gazette was "a paper of pure Toryism, disseminating the doctrines of monarchy, aristocracy, and the exclusion of the influence of the people." When Jefferson requested to publish information that would disgrace the Federalists, Fenno was uncooperative. The Republicans would mock his relations to his sponsors—who remained mostly pro-Federalist, even in advertising—as sycophancy to a nobility.

On October 31, 1791, the National Gazette was founded as a nationwide rival to the Gazette of the United States from a Democratic-Republican perspective at the urging of party leaders Thomas Jefferson and James Madison, edited by Philip Freneau. Over its history, the National Gazette would print works by Freneau, Madison, and less prominent politicians.

Fenno's responses to the National Gazette were condescending, often name-calling or personal attacks, and thought to confirm Freneau's depictions of Fenno and his allies. Hamilton himself wrote multiple essays to criticize the National Gazette.

The political impact of Freneau's newspaper more than satisfied Jefferson and Madison. By publicizing Hamilton and Jefferson's rivalry, the two papers further worsened the two statesmen's relationship, while the intense partisan debate alienated readers.

Later in 1792, the paper's connections to the Democratic-Republicans were publicly exposed, which Freneau and his sponsors struggled to explain. The Democratic-Republicans resorted to similar accusations about the Gazette of the United States. A debate ensued about which side's partisanship was more at fault, ultimately lost by the Jeffersonians. Thus the National Gazette backfired on its benefactors. Jefferson's relationship with the Washington administration deteriorated, and both Jefferson and Madison ended most of their involvement with the press.

Freneau was commercially failing, facing problems with subscriptions, advertising, and printing services similar to those that Fenno was facing. The National Gazette's sponsors did not bail it out. The National Gazette's last issue was printed on October 26, 1793, during the Philadelphia yellow fever epidemic, outlived by its rival. Historian Jeffrey Pasley blames the failure of the National Gazette on Jefferson and Madison's flawed political strategy and Freneau's flawed business strategy.

=== Aurora ===
On November 8, 1794, the Philadelphia Aurora, edited by Benjamin Franklin Bache, started printing, taking the place of the Gazette of the United States's rival. It was previously named the Aurora General Advertiser. Bache was known for his fierce criticism of the Washington administration. In the only in-person interaction of Fenno and Bache, they fought each other in the streets. Like Fenno, Bache died in 1798 due to yellow fever.

== Impact ==
John Fenno's goal to found the definitive newspaper, which would unite the nation, was never fully realized. He did, however, set the foundation for American newspaper politics, and his work is remembered as the leading Federalist newspaper of the 1780s and 1790s.

The National Gazette, founded to counterbalance the Gazette of the United States, was the first American party newspaper and influenced other newspapers to link themselves to political parties. Partisan newspapers like the two gazettes, while fundamentally political, were private and had to support themselves through commercial means. Hamilton and Jefferson avoided creating an official newspaper, fearing an association with the unpopular The London Gazette, an officially supported British newspaper. Present and future political partisans supported partisan newspapers and thus influenced public opinion through indirect means like government jobs. Indirect partisan sponsorship still encouraged newspapers to become more partisan in turn.

== See also ==
- Bibliography of Alexander Hamilton
- First Party System
- History of American journalism
- History of American newspapers § Revolutionary epoch and early national era: 1770–1820
- Media bias in the United States
