= Freneau, New Jersey =

Populated place in Monmouth County, New Jersey, US

- Unincorporated community
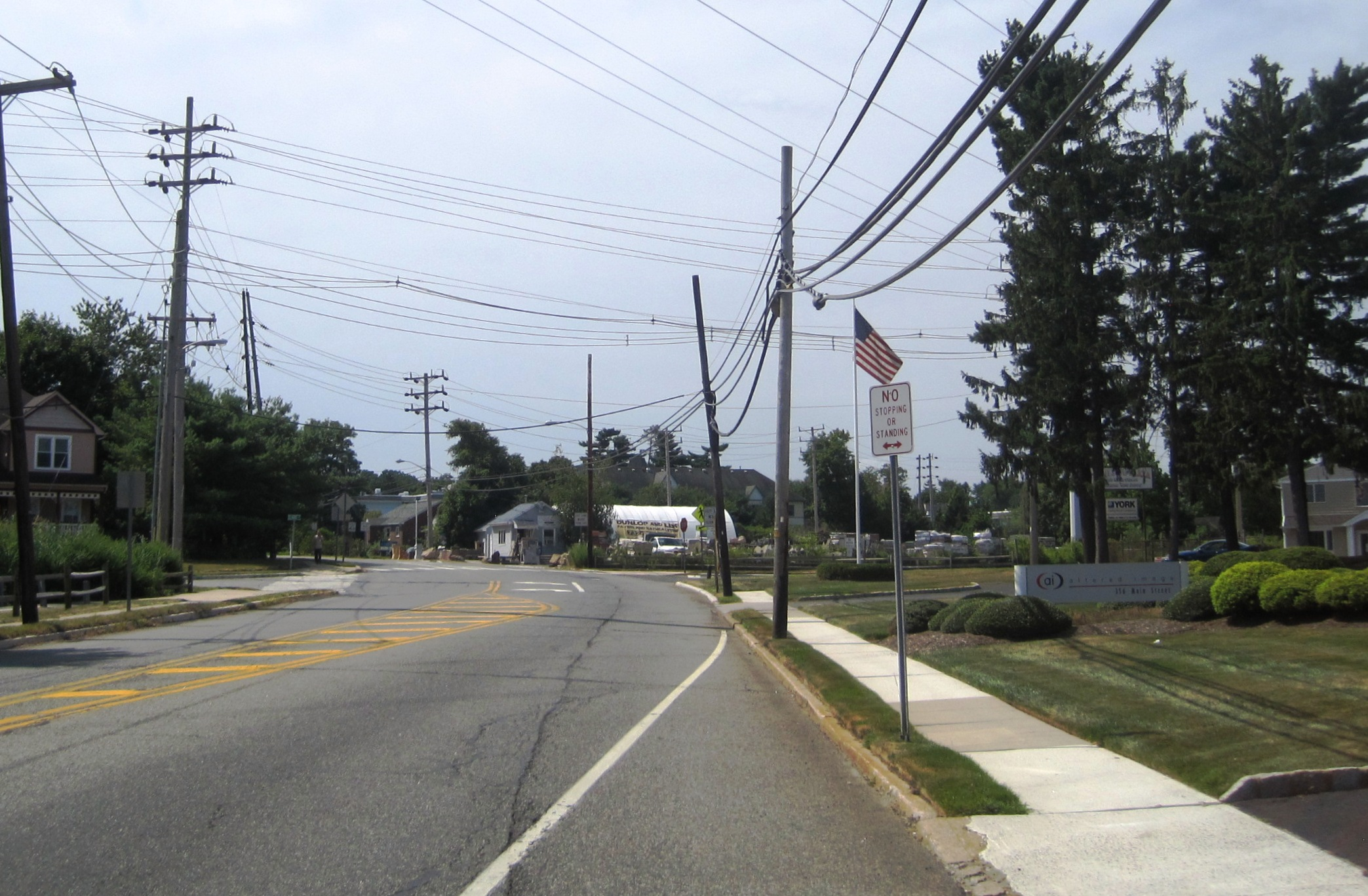
- Along Route 79

- Location in Monmouth County. Inset: Location of county within the state of New Jersey Freneau (New Jersey) Freneau (the United States)
- Coordinates: 40°24′06″N 74°14′16″W
- Country: United States
- State: New Jersey
- County: Monmouth
- Borough: Matawan
- Named for: Philip Freneau
- Elevation: 79 ft (24 m)
- GNIS feature ID: 876512

Freneau is an unincorporated community located within Matawan in Monmouth County, in the U.S. state of New Jersey. It is named for Philip Freneau (1752–1832), a poet during the American Revolutionary War. The community is located along New Jersey Route 79 in the southern portion of Matawan and was formerly served by the Monmouth County Agricultural Railroad (now a part of the Henry Hudson Trail).
