= William Warden (printer) =

- Born: 1761
- Died: March 18, 1786 (aged 24–25)
- Resting place: Granary Burying Ground
- Occupations: Printer, newspaper publisher
- Known for: Co-founder of the Massachusetts Centinel
- Partner: Benjamin Russell (publishing partner)

William Warden (1761 – March 18, 1786) was a printer in late 18th-century Boston, Massachusetts.

== Biography ==
In March 1784, when Warden was 23 years of age, he established the Massachusetts Centinel newspaper, with Benjamin Russell. The printing-office of Warden & Russell was located in March 1784 "at the southeast corner of State House" in Boston, and later moved to 9 Marlborough Street. The publishing partnership continued until Warden's death in 1786. Warden never married. He died "after a lingering illness" at age 25, and was interred in the Granary Burying Ground.
