= Enos Bronson =

- Born: March 31, 1774; Waterbury, Connecticut
- Died: April 22, 1823 (aged 49); Philadelphia, Pennsylvania
- Occupations: American newspaper publisher and first head of the Deerfield Academy

Enos Bronson (March 31, 1774 – April 22, 1823) was an American writer and newspaper publisher. A graduate of Yale College, he became the first head of the newly founded Deerfield Academy.

== Background ==
Born in Waterbury, Connecticut on March 31, 1774, Enos Bronson was the son-in-law of prominent Episcopal Bishop William White.

Much of Bronson's career was spent in Philadelphia where, as a newspaper editor and publisher, he was also active in community affairs. From 1801 to 1804 he published the daily Gazette of the United States. From 1804 to 1818, he and his partner Elihu Chauncey published a semiweekly newspaper, The United States' Gazette for the Country.

Allied with the Federalist Party, Bronson was also elected as a member of the American Antiquarian Society in 1815.

== Death and interment ==
Bronson died at the age of 49 in Philadelphia on April 22, 1823, and was buried at the cemetery of that city's Christ Episcopal Church.
