= Columbian Centinel =

Historical newspaper in the United States

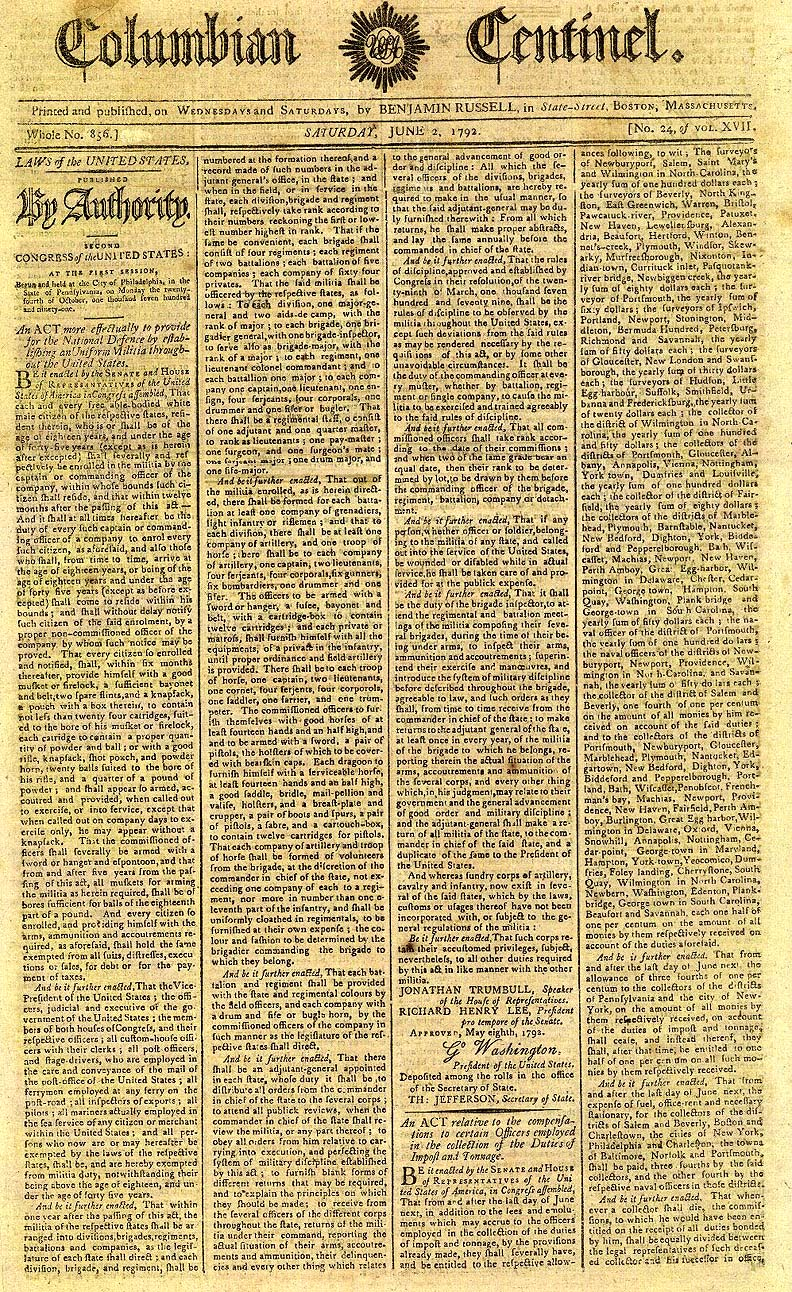
- Type: Semi-weekly newspaper
- Founded: June 16, 1790; 236 years ago
- Ceased publication: May 23, 1840; 186 years ago
- Language: English
- Headquarters: Boston, Massachusetts, United States

The Columbian Centinel (1790–1840) was a Boston, Massachusetts, newspaper established by Benjamin Russell. It continued its predecessor, the Massachusetts Centinel and the Republican Journal, which Russell and partner William Warden had first issued on March 24, 1784. The paper was "the most influential and enterprising paper in Massachusetts after the Revolution." In the Federalist Era, the newspaper was aligned with Federalist sentiment. Until c. 1800 its circulation was the largest in Boston, and its closest competitor was the anti-Federalist Independent Chronicle ("the compliments that were frequently exchanged by these journalistic adversaries were more forcible than polite").

Russell "can be justly characterized as the Horace Greeley of his time." In 1828 Russell sold the Centinel to Joseph T. Adams and Thomas Hudson, who continued publishing it. In 1840, the Centinel merged with a number of other Boston papers—the Independent Chronicle & Boston Patriot, the Boston Commercial Gazette, and the New-England Palladium—to form the Boston Semi-weekly Advertiser, which eventually became the Boston Herald.

== Titles ==
- The Massachusetts Centinel: and the Republican Journal. Mar. 24 – Oct. 13, 1784.
- The Massachusetts Centinel. Oct. 16, 1784 – June 12, 1790.
- Columbian Centinel. June 16, 1790 – Oct. 2, 1799.
- Columbian Centinel & Massachusetts Federalist. Oct. 5, 1799 – July 2, 1800.
- Columbian Centinel. Massachusetts Federalist. July 5 – Dec. 31, 1800.
- Columbian Centinel. Sept. 5, 1804 – May 23, 1840.
