= Jeffrey Pasley =

American historian (born 1964)

Jeffrey Lingan Pasley (born February 27, 1964) is a professor of American history at the University of Missouri, specializing in the Early Republic.

He is the oldest son of John Pasley, a former civil engineer and local public official.

== Early life and education ==
Pasley spent most of his childhood in Topeka, Kansas, graduating from Washburn Rural High School in 1982. He graduated from Carleton College, a liberal-arts school in Northfield, Minnesota, in 1986. After graduating, he moved to Washington, D.C., where he worked on the staff of Al Gore's attempted campaign for the Democratic presidential nomination in the 1988 election, during much of 1986 and 1987. Throughout the same period, he also contributed articles for The New Republic, a liberal political commentary magazine.

== Academic career ==
Pasley completed graduate school at Harvard University in 1993 with a Ph.D. in history. He taught at Florida State University from 1993 to 1999 before beginning his current tenure at the University of Missouri later in 1999. Pasley's research focuses on American political culture between the American Revolution and the Civil War.

Pasley has taught classes on the United States during the Cold War, especially in the field of popular conspiracy theories. Pasley also studies different periods of American history through comic books.

His 2001 book The Tyranny of Printers showed that many early professional politicians in the U.S. were newspaper printers and editors. According to Pasley, "the newspaper press was the political system's central institution, not simply a forum or atmosphere in which politics took place. Instead, newspapers and their editors were purposeful actors in the political process, linking parties, voters, and the government together, and pursuing specific political goals." A later work, The First Presidential Contest (2013) was described as "the 1796 election as a rough draft of the democratic presidential campaigns that came later rather than as the personal squabble depicted by other historians."

== Bibliography ==
- "The Tyranny of Printers": Newspaper Politics in the Early American Republic (University of Virginia Press, 2001, ISBN 9780813921778)
- Beyond the Founders: New Approaches to the Political History of the Early American Republic, co-authored with David Waldstreicher and Andrew Robertson (University of North Carolina Press, 2004, ISBN 9780807855584)
- The First Presidential Contest: The Election of 1796 and the Founding of American Democracy (University of Kansas Press, 2013, ISBN 9780700619078)
