= Benjamin Russell (journalist) =

American journalist

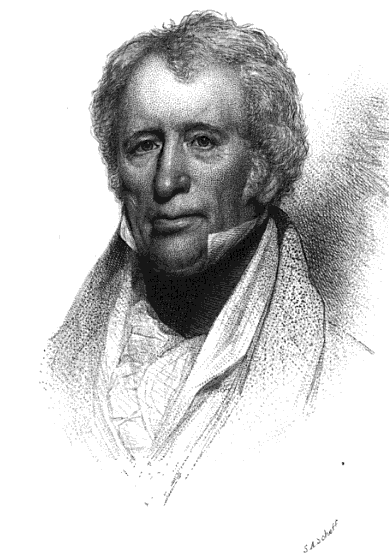

Member of the Boston Board of Aldermen
- In office January 5, 1829 – January 7, 1833
- Preceded by: John Pickering; James Savage; Phineas Upham
- Succeeded by: Thomas Wetmore; Samuel Fales; Joseph Warren Revere; Benjamin Fiske

Member of the Boston Common Council from the 9th ward
- In office May 1, 1822 – January 5, 1829
- Preceded by: Office established
- Succeeded by: Thomas Minns; James Brackett Richardson

Personal details
- Born: September 13, 1761 Boston
- Died: January 4, 1845 (aged 83)
- Party: Federalist
- Occupation: publisher, editor

Benjamin Russell (September 13, 1761 – January 4, 1845) was an American journalist, born in Boston. He established the Columbian Centinel and was one of the founding members of the American Antiquarian Society.

== Early life ==
Benjamin Russell was born on 13 September 1761, son of John Russell, a stonemason. He was educated in the public school in Boston, and as a youth often visited the printing offices of Isaiah Thomas, a newspaper owner with whom he apprenticed in Worcester, Massachusetts. Russel would also join Thomas later in life as a founding member of the American Antiquarian Society in 1812.

== Military service ==
When the Declaration of Independence was received in Worcester, Russell attempted to enlist in the Continental Army but was refused because he was a minor. Later, in 1780 he was enlisted in the Revolutionary army, taking the place of his employer, Isaiah Thomas, who had received a draft notice. Benjamin's Rev. War Pension Application states, in his own handwriting, that he served as a private. He was never an officer.

While in the army Russell was present at the execution of British spy, Major John André who had been working with American General Benedict Arnold to capture the key base at West Point, New York. Russell was a member of the guard who escorted Andre to his place of execution

== Early career ==
After the war he began the publication of a semiweekly journal, the Columbian Centinel which commenced publication on 24 March 1784. This paper he controlled for 40 years and, assisted by Fisher Ames, Timothy Pickering, John Lowell, Stephen Higginson, and George Cabot as contributors, made it one of the most influential organs of the Federalist party.

Russell and William Warden first published the Massachusetts Centinel beginning in 1784. In 1785 Ben became the sole publisher and changed the name to the Columbian Centinel. Staff included Samuel Gilbert and Thomas Dean.

== Political office ==
Russell coined the expression "Era of Good Feeling" on the occasion of President Monroe's visit to Boston in 1817.

Russell served on the inaugural Boston Common Council in 1822, representing the ninth ward, and continued to serve in that office until 1829, when he was elevated to the Boston Board of Aldermen. He was an alderman from 1829 through 1833.

He was one of the aldermen of Boston, was a representative to the General Court, State Senator for a number of years, was a member of the Massachusetts Governor's Council, and was a member of the Massachusetts Constitutional Convention of 1820–1821.

== Late career ==
He resigned as editor of the Centinel in 1828, but until 1830 continued to edit the Boston Gazette, which he had established in 1795. Russell died on 4 January 1845 at age 83.

== Sources ==
- Bridgman, Thomas; Everett, Edward (1856). The Pilgrims of Boston and their descendants. New York: Appleton & Co. p. 249.
- Joseph Tinker Buckingham. Specimens of newspaper literature: with personal memoirs, anecdotes, and reminiscences, Volume 2. Boston: Redding and Co., 1852.
- Who was who in America: historical volume 1607-1896.
