= Philip Freneau =

American poet

Philip Morin Freneau
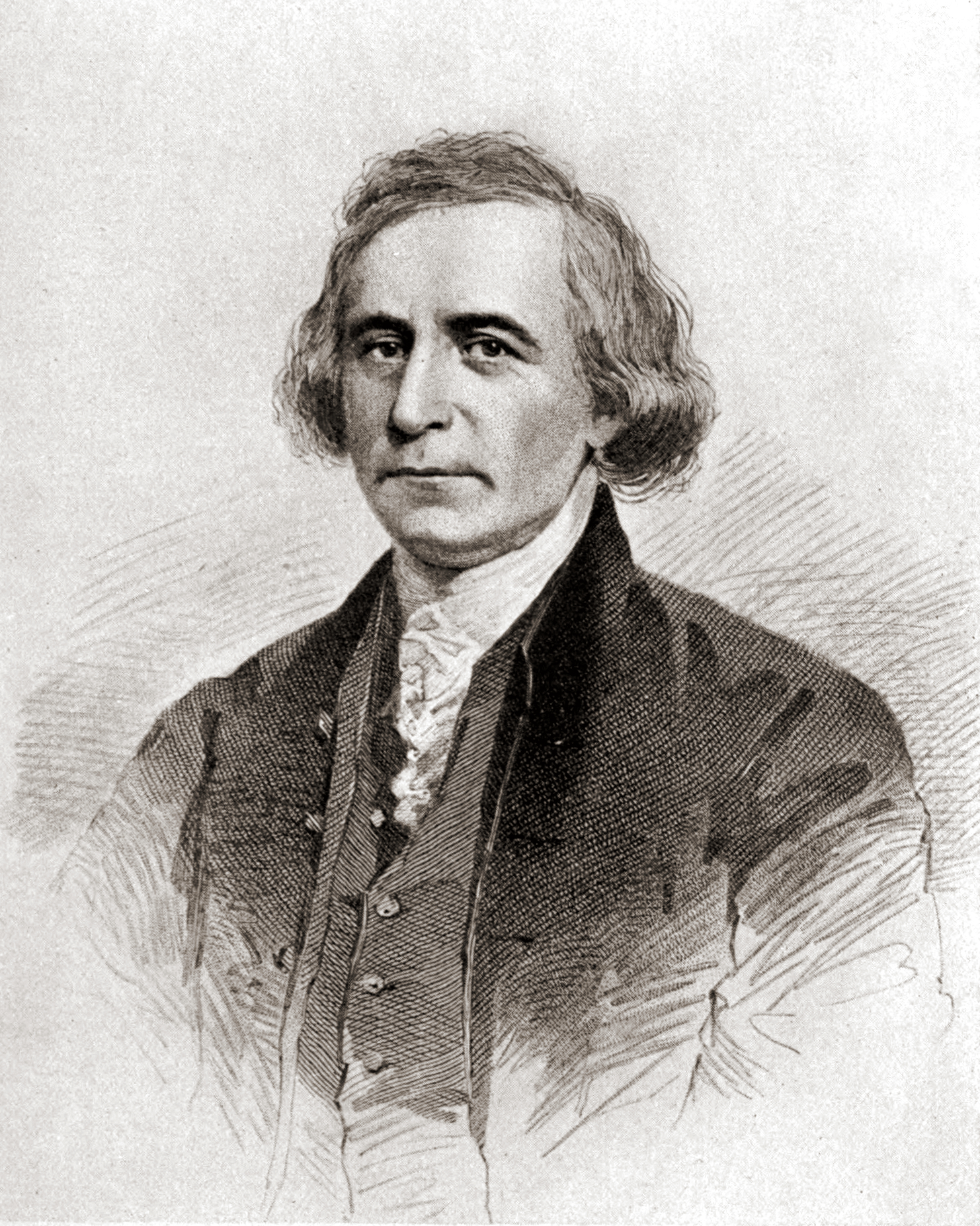
- Born: January 2, 1752; New York City, Province of New York, British America
- Died: December 18, 1832 (aged 80); Freehold, New Jersey, U.S.
- Education: Princeton University
- Occupations: Poet, writer, polemicist
- Writing career
- Language: English

Signature
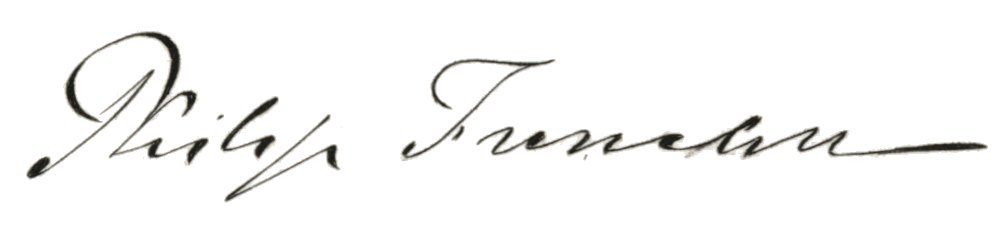

Philip Morin Freneau (January 2, 1752 – December 18, 1832) was an American poet, nationalist, polemicist, sea captain and early American newspaper editor sometimes called the "Poet of the American Revolution". Through his Philadelphia-based newspaper, the National Gazette, he was a strong critic of George Washington, Alexander Hamilton, and the Federalist Party, and a proponent of Jeffersonian policies.

== Early life and education ==
Freneau was born in New York City, the oldest of the five children of Huguenot wine merchant Pierre Freneau and his Scottish wife. Freneau was raised Calvinist by parents who were part of a Presbyterian congregation led by a New Light evangelical, Rev. William Tennent, Jr. Freneau later attended a grammar school directed by Tennent. Philip was raised in Matawan, New Jersey. He attended the College of New Jersey, later renamed Princeton University, where he studied under John Witherspoon.

At Princeton, Freneau was close friends with James Madison, and his relationship with Madison later was a factor in his co-founding the National Gazette with Madison and Thomas Jefferson. Freneau family tradition suggests that Madison became acquainted with and fell in love with the poet's sister, Mary, during visits to their home while he was studying at Princeton. While tradition has it that Mary rejected Madison's repeated marriage proposals, this anecdote is undocumented and unsupported by other evidence.

Freneau graduated from Princeton in 1771. He had already written the poetical History of the Prophet Jonah and, with Hugh Henry Brackenridge, the prose satire Father Bombo's Pilgrimage to Mecca, which is considered by some to be the first American novel.

== Career ==
Following his graduation, he tried his hand at teaching, but quickly gave it up. He also pursued a further study of theology, but gave this up as well after about two years. As the Revolutionary War approached in 1775, Freneau wrote a number of anti-British pieces. However, by 1776, Freneau left America for the West Indies, and for two years was a business agent on Saint Croix, observing the horrors of slavery up close. One of his best-known poems, "On Sir Toby", catalogs these horrors and has become a well-known anti-slavery poem. In 1778, Freneau returned to America, and rejoined the patriotic cause. Freneau eventually became a crew member on a revolutionary privateer, and was captured in this capacity. He was held on a British prison ship for about six weeks. This experience, which almost killed him, was detailed in his work The British Prison Ship, which prompted many more patriotic and anti-British writings throughout the revolution and after. For this, he was named "The Poet of the American Revolution".

In 1790, Freneau married Eleanor Forman, and became an assistant editor of the New York Daily Advertiser. Soon after, Madison and Secretary of State Thomas Jefferson worked to get Freneau to move to Philadelphia in order to edit a partisan newspaper that would counter the Federalist newspaper The Gazette of the United States. Jefferson was criticized for hiring Freneau as a translator in the State Department, even though he spoke no foreign languages except French. Freneau accepted this sinecure, which left free time to head the Democratic-Republican newspaper Jefferson and Madison envisioned.

This partisan newspaper, National Gazette, which Freneau founded in Philadelphia with Jefferson, Madison, and others, provided a vehicle to promote criticism of the rival Federalist Party. The Gazette took particular aim at the policies promoted by Alexander Hamilton, and like other papers of the day, would not hesitate to shade into personal attacks, including President George Washington during his second term. Owing to The Gazette's frequent attacks on his administration and himself, Washington took a particular dislike to Freneau.

Freneau later retired to a more rural life and wrote a mix of political and nature works.

== Death ==
He died at 80 years of age, frozen to death while returning to his home near Freehold, New Jersey, and was buried in what became the Philip Morin Freneau Cemetery on Poet's Drive in Matawan, New Jersey. His mother was also buried there but his wife was laid to rest at her family plot in Mount Pleasant Church Cemetery on what is now Route 516 and Main in Matawan.

== Legacy ==
The non-political works of Freneau combined neoclassicism and romanticism. Although he is not as generally well known as Ralph Waldo Emerson or James Fenimore Cooper, Freneau introduced many themes and images for which later authors became famous. For example, Freneau's poem "The House of Night", one of the early romantic poems written and published in America, included the Gothic elements and dark imagery that later were seen in the poetry by Edgar Allan Poe. Freneau's nature poem "The Wild Honey Suckle" (1786) was considered an early seed to the later Transcendentalist movement taken up by William Cullen Bryant, Ralph Waldo Emerson, and Henry David Thoreau. Romantic primitivism was anticipated by Freneau's poems "The Indian Burying Ground" and "Noble Savage."

Memorials to him in Matawan include:

- The Matawan Post Office on Main Street has a sculpture of Freneau on its wall, depicting him with black slaves as he was an abolitionist later in life. It was created in 1939 by Armin Scheler under a New Deal commission from the Treasury Department.
- There is a Freneau fire company on Main Street/Route 79.
- A site Freneau frequented in Matawan is now in use as a restaurant. From 1961 until 2008, it operated as The Poet's Inn, honoring Freneau's memory. The business has changed hands several times, and the building has been renovated over the years.
- Freneau, New Jersey, an unincorporated community within Matawan, was named in his honor.
- Freneau Woods Park, named after Philip Morin Freneau, whose family once partly owned the property is located along the headwaters of Matawan Creek and Lake Lefferts. This 313-acre park is composed mostly of woodland and protects critical wildlife habitat and bolsters water quality in the region. Both historically and environmentally significant, the park provides open space in a densely populated area of the county.

In 2022, the band Bird in the Belly used the words from Freneau's poem "Pestilence" for their concept album After the city. The lyrics appear in the song "Pale Horse" and represent the arrival of the pale horse into their fictional depiction of London.

== See also ==
- History of American newspapers
