= National Gazette =

Short-lived Democratic-Republican Party-aligned newspaper

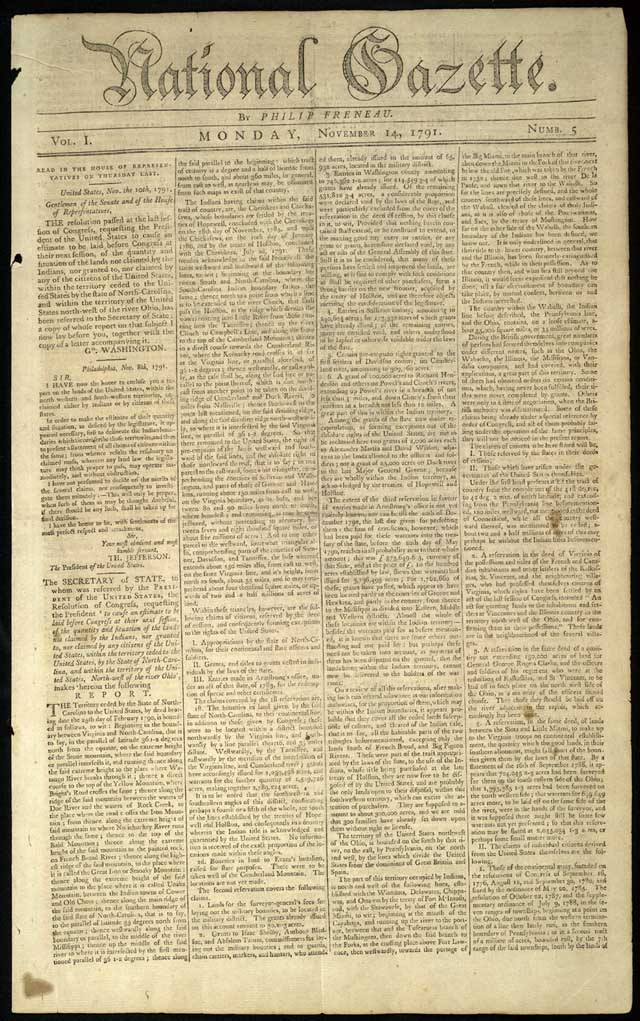
- The November 14, 1791 issue of the National Gazette
- Type: Semiweekly newspaper
- Owner: Philip Morin Freneau
- Editor: Philip Morin Freneau
- Founded: 1791
- Ceased publication: 1793
- Political alignment: Anti-Administration Party; Democratic-Republican Party
- Headquarters: Philadelphia, Pennsylvania, U.S.

The National Gazette was a Democratic-Republican partisan newspaper that was first published on October 31, 1791. It was edited and published semiweekly in Philadelphia by Philip Freneau until October 23, 1793.

The National Gazette was founded at the urging of Democratic-Republican leaders James Madison and Thomas Jefferson in order to counter the influence of the rival Federalist newspaper, the Gazette of the United States. Like other papers of the era, the National Gazette centered on its fervent political content. The Gazette's political content was often written pseudonymously, and was directed against the Federalist Party. Many prominent Democratic-Republicans contributed articles, often pseudonymously, including Madison and Jefferson.

The Gazette is unique among early American partisan newspapers for being substantially supported by a major player within a sitting administration (then Secretary of State Thomas Jefferson) while simultaneously attacking that administration's own policies. Jefferson enticed Freneau to come to Philadelphia to edit the Gazette by hiring him as a translator at the United States Department of State for an annual salary of $250. Federalist writers, including Alexander Hamilton, attacked this as a conflict of interest. Hamilton and other Federalists also financially supported their own partisan newspaper, the Gazette of the United States, although their publication did not attack Washington and his policies, but praised them effusively.

Freneau's Gazette spent much of its time criticizing the policies of the Washington administration. The paper described Alexander Hamilton's financial policies in 1792 as "numerous evils...pregnant with every mischief" and described George Washington's 61st birthday celebration as "a forerunner of other monarchical vices." The Gazette's strident polemics and screeds against the Washington administration led President Washington to despise the Gazette, and to refer to its editor pejoratively as "that Rascal Freneau."

The National Gazette unofficially stopped publishing in October 1793, two years after its establishment, citing "a considerable quantity of new and elegant printing types from Europe" to be obtained, but it is believed that the outbreak of yellow fever in Philadelphia, combined with dwindling subscriptions contributed to the paper's demise. In December 1793, Jefferson resigned as U.S. Secretary of State, ending Freneau's main source of income aside from the paper.

Another newspaper of the same name was being published in Philadelphia in 1830.
