= The Busy-Body (pen name) =

Pen name used by Benjamin Franklin and Joseph Breintnall

Detail of "The Busy-Body No.2"

The Busy-Body was a pen name used by Benjamin Franklin and Joseph Breintnall in a column printed in The American Weekly Mercury, an early American newspaper founded and published by Andrew Bradford. There are 32 letters in "The Busy-Body" series. The essays were printed in 1729.

== History ==
In 1728 Franklin and Hugh Meredith conspired to start a newspaper that would compete with Andrew Bradford and his The American Weekly Mercury. Franklin mentioned their intentions to a journeyman seeking employment named George Webb. Samuel Keimer in turn learned from Webb about Franklin and Meredith's enterprise and labored to launch his own newspaper, Pennsylvania Gazette before Franklin and Meredith. The first issue of Keimer's Gazette appeared December 24, 1728. Franklin describes the events in his Autobiography of Benjamin Franklin (1791):

I requested Webb not to mention it; but he told it to Keimer, who immediately, to be beforehand with me, published proposals for printing one himself, on which Webb was to be employ'd. I resented this; and, to counteract them, as I could not yet begin our paper, I wrote several pieces of entertainment for Bradford's paper, under the title of the Busy Body, which Breintnal continu'd some months. By this means the attention of the publick was fixed on that paper, and Keimer's proposals, which we burlesqu'd and ridicul'd, were disregarded. He began his paper, however, and, after carrying it on three quarters of a year, with at most only ninety subscribers, he offered it to me for a trifle; and I, having been ready some time to go on with it, took it in hand directly; and it prov'd in a few years extremely profitable to me.

"The Busy-Body" was intended to suppress Keimer's readership by bolstering Bradford's sales of The American Weekly Mercury. "The Busy-Body No.1" appeared February 4, 1729; "The Busy-Body No.32" ended the run abruptly on September 25, 1729, the same week that Franklin and Meredith bought the failing Pennsylvania Gazette from Keimer.

== Authorship ==
Since the 1790s, it has been widely held that Franklin wrote the first four letters in "The Busy-Body" series, contributed to numbers five and eight, while Breintnall wrote the remaining twenty-six (Albert Smyth, II, 100n. in Tolles, 247). Marginalia on the issue of The American Weekly Mercury from February 18, 1729 held by the archives of The Library Company of Philadelphia (most likely made by Franklin) suggest that, "The Busy Body was begun by B.F. who wrote the first four Numbers, Part of No. 5, part of No. 8, the rest by J. Brintnal [sic]." Franklin's Autobiography is the primary source of our knowledge that it was Breintnall who took over "The Busy Body."

== Letters ==
=== No. 1 ===
The first article in "The Busy-Body" series was written by Benjamin Franklin and published February 4, 1729. In "The Busy-Body no. 1" Franklin establishes the character of the anonymous Busy-Body as a self-declared "Censor Morum", or a critic of morals.

With more Concern have I continually observ'd the growing Vices and Follies of my Country-folk. And tho' Reformation is properly the concern of every Man; that is, Every one ought to mend One; yet 'tis too true in this Case, that what is every Body's Business is no Body's Business, and the Business is done accordingly. I, therefore, upon mature Deliberation, think fit to take no Body's Business wholly into my own Hands; and, out of Zeal for the Publick Good, design to erect my Self into a Kind of "Censor Morum"; proposing with your Allowance, to make Use of the Weekly Mercury as a Vehicle in which my Remonstrances shall be convey'd to the World.

"The Busy-Body No.1" was the lead-off article of Andrew Bradford's The American Weekly Mercury the week that it appeared. The letters stayed at the front of the publication for 32 weeks.

=== No. 18 ===
"The Busy-Body No. 18" was written by Joseph Breintnall. Published on June 19, 1729, No. 18 is notable for its inclusion of the poem, "A plain Description of one single Street in this City." The poem, which offers a glimpse into colonial Philadelphia in 1729, is attributed to Breintnall, though the narrative persona of The Busy Body only names the author of the poem as "a Friend." The poem describes a progressive walk down Market Street in the city of Philadelphia, from the Delaware River to the Schuylkill River. "A plain Description of one Single Street in this City" opens with an account of the Market Street docks and the nearby homes of merchants. The poem then goes on to describe local landmarks of colonial Philadelphia, including the courthouse, the "Stocks, Post and Pillory," and the Quaker Meeting House that once stood at the intersection of Market and Second. The poem also catalogs some of the various tradesmen's shops that once populated this central street.
