= Junto (club) =

Philadelphia club started by Benjamin Franklin

The Junto, also known as the Leather Apron Club, was a club for mutual improvement established in 1727 by Benjamin Franklin in Philadelphia. The Leather Apron Club's purpose was to debate questions of morals, politics, and natural philosophy, and to exchange knowledge of business affairs.

== History ==
Benjamin Franklin organized a group of friends to provide a structured form of mutual improvement. The group, initially composed of 12 members, called itself the Junto, derived from the Spanish word junta, or assembly. Its members were enterprising tradesmen and artisans rather than members of the social elite, who had their own gentlemen's clubs. Among the original members were printers, surveyors, a joiner, a shoemaker, a copier of deeds and a merchant's clerk. Franklin described Hugh Meredith as thirty years of age, Joseph Breintnall as middle-aged, William Coleman as about his own age and Robert Grace as a young gentleman.

In 1727, as manager of Samuel Keimer's print shop, the 21-year-old Franklin trained Keimer's five hands, among them Hugh Meredith, Stephen Potts and George Webb, all three later Junto members. He drew the Junto's other members from what he called "most of my ingenious acquaintance".

All members lived in Philadelphia and came from diverse areas of interest and business. Along with Meredith, Potts, and Webb, they included Joseph Breintnall, merchant and scrivener, who also loved poetry and natural history. Thomas Godfrey was a glazier, mathematician, and inventor; and Nicholas Scull II and William Parsons were both surveyors. Scull was also a bibliophile and Parsons a cobbler and astrologer. William Maugridge was a cabinetmaker, William Coleman a merchant's clerk, and Robert Grace a gentleman. Grace, who had some family money, was generous, witty and fond of puns. The twelfth member of the Junto remained a mystery until 2007, when Professor George Boudreau of Pennsylvania State University discovered a long-forgotten account of the club's refreshments and verified that shoemaker John Jones Jr. was an original member. Jones was a Philadelphia Quaker, a neighbor of Franklin's, and later a founding member of the Library Company of Philadelphia. The club met on Friday evenings, first in an alehouse and later in a room in Robert Grace's house, to discuss moral, political, and scientific topics of the day.

Franklin describes the formation and purpose of the Junto in his autobiography:

I should have mentioned before, that, in the autumn of the preceding year, [1727] I had form'd most of my ingenious acquaintance into a club of mutual improvement, which we called the Junto; we met on Friday evenings. The rules that I drew up required that every member, in his turn, should produce one or more queries on any point of Morals, Politics, or Natural Philosophy, to be discuss'd by the company; and once in three months produce and read an essay of his own writing, on any subject he pleased.

Our debates were to be under the direction of a president, and to be conducted in the sincere spirit of inquiry after truth, without fondness for dispute or desire of victory; and to prevent warmth, all expressions of positiveness in opinions, or direct contradiction, were after some time made contraband, and prohibited under small pecuniary penalties.

I even forbid myself, agreeably to the old laws of our Junto, the use of every word or expression in the language that imported a fix'd opinion, such as certainly, undoubtedly, etc., and I adopted, instead of them, I conceive, I apprehend, or I imagine a thing to be so or so; or it so appears to me at present.

— Benjamin Franklin, Autobiography

=== Prehistory ===
Franklin was influenced by two predecessor organizations in particular.

==== Dry Club ====
One was an English group called the “Dry Club,” which had philosopher John Locke, William Popple, and Benjamin Furly among its members during the 1690s (and was itself partially inspired by Furly's “heretics of the Lantern” society). It met one evening a week for two hours at a time and required that its members reply affirmatively to the following questions:

1. Whether he loves all Men, of what Profession or Religion soever?
2. Whether he thinks no person ought to be harmed in his Body, Name, or Goods, for mere speculative Opinions, or his external way of Worship?
3. Whether he loves and seeks Truth for Truth's sake; and will endeavour impartially to find and receive it himself, and to communicate it to others?

Each member of the club would take turns proposing topics for discussion and moderating these discussions. The discussions were to be held in a spirit of open-minded tolerance:

That no Person or Opinion be unhandsomely reflected on; but every Member behave himself with all the temper, judgement, modesty, and discretion he is master of.

==== Neighborhood benefit and reforming societies ====
The other important predecessors were the "neighborhood benefit societies” and “reforming societies” proposed in Massachusetts by Cotton Mather. Cotton Mather described the neighborhood societies as being composed of a dozen married couples who would meet at one another's homes in succession for prayer and other religious exercises, and also to consider questions like the following:

- Who are in any peculiar adversity; and what may be done to comfort them?
- What contention or variance may there be among our neighbours; and what may be done for healing it?
- In what open transgressions do any live? and who shall be desired to carry faithful admonitions to them?

The similar reforming societies would entertain questions like these:

- Can any further methods be devised that ignorance and wickedness may be more chased from our people in general; and that domestic piety, in particular, may flourish among them?
- Is there any instance of oppression or fraudulence in the dealings of any sort of people, which may call for our efforts to rectify it?
- Is there any matter to be humbly recommended to the legislative power, to be enacted into a law for the public benefit?
- Do we know of any person languishing under severe affliction, and is there any thing we can do for the succour of that afflicted neighbour?
- Has any person a proposal to make, for our further advantage and assistance, that we may be in a better and more regular capacity for prosecuting these intentions?

== Questions ==
The Junto's Friday evening meetings were organized around a series of questions that Franklin devised, covering a range of intellectual, personal, business, and community topics. These questions were used as a springboard for discussion and community action. Through the Junto, Franklin promoted a volunteer fire company and a paid city watch (see Projects).

=== List of questions ===
Franklin's list of questions survives among his papers. As printed in Political, Miscellaneous, and Philosophical Pieces (1779), the questions are:

1. Have you met with any thing in the author you last read, remarkable, or suitable to be communicated to the Junto? particularly in history, morality, poetry, physic, travels, mechanic arts, or other parts of knowledge.
2. What new story have you lately heard agreeable for telling in conversation?
3. Hath any citizen in your knowledge failed in his business lately, and what have you heard of the cause?
4. Have you lately heard of any citizen’s thriving well, and by what means?
5. Have you lately heard how any present rich man, here or elsewhere, got his estate?
6. Do you know of any fellow citizen, who has lately done a worthy action, deserving praise and imitation? or who has committed an error proper for us to be warned against and avoid?
7. What unhappy effects of intemperance have you lately observed or heard? of imprudence? of passion? or of any other vice or folly?
8. What happy effects of temperance? of prudence? of moderation? or of any other virtue?
9. Have you or any of your acquaintance been lately sick or wounded? If so, what remedies were used, and what were their effects?
10. Who do you know that are shortly going voyages or journies, if one should have occasion to send by them?
11. Do you think of any thing at present, in which the Junto may be serviceable to mankind? to their country, to their friends, or to themselves?
12. Hath any deserving stranger arrived in town since last meeting, that you heard of? and what have you heard or observed of his character or merits? and whether think you, it lies in the power of the Junto to oblige him, or encourage him as he deserves?
13. Do you know of any deserving young beginner lately set up, whom it lies in the power of the Junto any way to encourage?
14. Have you lately observed any defect in the laws of your country, [of] which it would be proper to move the legislature for an amendment? Or do you know of any beneficial law that is wanting
15. Have you lately observed any encroachment on the just liberties of the people?
16. Hath any body attacked your reputation lately? and what can the Junto do towards securing it?
17. Is there any man whose friendship you want, and which the Junto or any of them, can procure for you?
18. Have you lately heard any member’s character attacked, and how have you defended it?
19. Hath any man injured you, from whom it is in the power of the Junto to procure redress?
20. In what manner can the Junto, or any of them, assist you in any of your honourable designs?
21. Have you any weighty affair in hand, in which you think the advice of the Junto may be of service?
22. What benefits have you lately received from any man not present?
23. Is there any difficulty in matters of opinion, of justice, and injustice, which you would gladly have discussed at this time?
24. Do you see any thing amiss in the present customs or proceedings of the Junto, which might be amended?

Any person to be qualified, to stand up, and lay his hand on his breast, and be asked these questions; viz.

1. Have you any particular disrespect to any present members? Answer. I have not.
2. Do you sincerely declare that you love mankind in general; of what profession or religion soever? Answ. I do.
3. Do you think any person ought to be harmed in his body, name or goods, for mere speculative opinions, or his external way of worship? Ans. No.
4. Do you love truth’s sake, and will you endeavour impartially to find and receive it yourself and communicate it to others? Answ. Yes.

== Projects ==
Several of Franklin's civic projects began as Junto discussions. A debate in the club on whether Pennsylvania needed more paper money led Franklin to write and print an anonymous pamphlet arguing for it.

The members pooled their books in their meeting room, an arrangement they gave up after about a year. Franklin then proposed a subscription library and, "by the help of my friends in the Junto", found its first fifty subscribers. It became the Library Company of Philadelphia, whose articles of agreement were signed on July 1, 1731.

Franklin read the Junto a paper on the city watch, proposing paid watchmen supported by a tax "proportion'd to the property", and another on the causes of house fires, which led to the Union Fire Company. When he set out to found an academy, the Junto "furnished a good part" of the friends he first enlisted; the academy became the University of Pennsylvania.

The Junto kept itself secret and limited to twelve members. Rather than enlarge it, Franklin proposed that each member start a subordinate club with the same rules, without revealing the connection; five or six were formed, among them the Vine, the Union and the Band. The club continued for nearly forty years, and Franklin called it "the best school of philosophy, morality, and politics that then existed in the province".

== See also ==
- The Papers of Benjamin Franklin
- American Philosophical Society
- Bloomsbury Group
- Headstrong Club
- Invisible College
- Lunar Society
- Toastmasters International
- Whig Junto
- Wicht Club
