= Busybody (disambiguation) =

A busybody is someone who meddles in the affairs of others.

The term may also refer to:

- Busybody (horse), thoroughbred
- Busy Body (album), by Luther Vandross
- The Busy-Body (pen name), column in American Weekly Mercury
- The Busy Body (film) (1967)
- The Busy Body, 1966 novel by Donald E. Westlake
- Busy Bodies, 1933 short film starring Laurel and Hardy

== See also ==
- The Busie Body, play by Susanna Centlivre
