= William Parsons (surveyor) =

English Surveyor

William Parsons (6 May 1701 – 22 or 17 December 1757) was an English surveyor who served as the Surveyor-General of the English Province of Pennsylvania from 1741 to 1748 and laid out the street plans for the towns of Reading and Easton, Pennsylvania.

== Biography ==
Parsons was born on 6 May 1701 in England. While young, he began to learn the trade of shoemaking. In 1720, he moved to Pennsylvania and continued learning his trade. Two years later, he married Johanna Christiana Zeidig in Philadelphia. He also began to pursue the study of Mathematics at the same time. Parsons slowly became acquainted with Benjamin Franklin throughout his time in the colony, becoming his friend and eventually joining Franklin's Junto Club in 1726. Parsons also served as the local librarian for eight years.

In 1741, Parsons was appointed Surveyor General of the Pennsylvania Province, succeeding Benjamin Eastburn. For the next seven years, he served in his position, until in 1748, where due to physical hardships he resigned. During his service as Surveyor-General, he laid out the town of Reading, Pennsylvania.

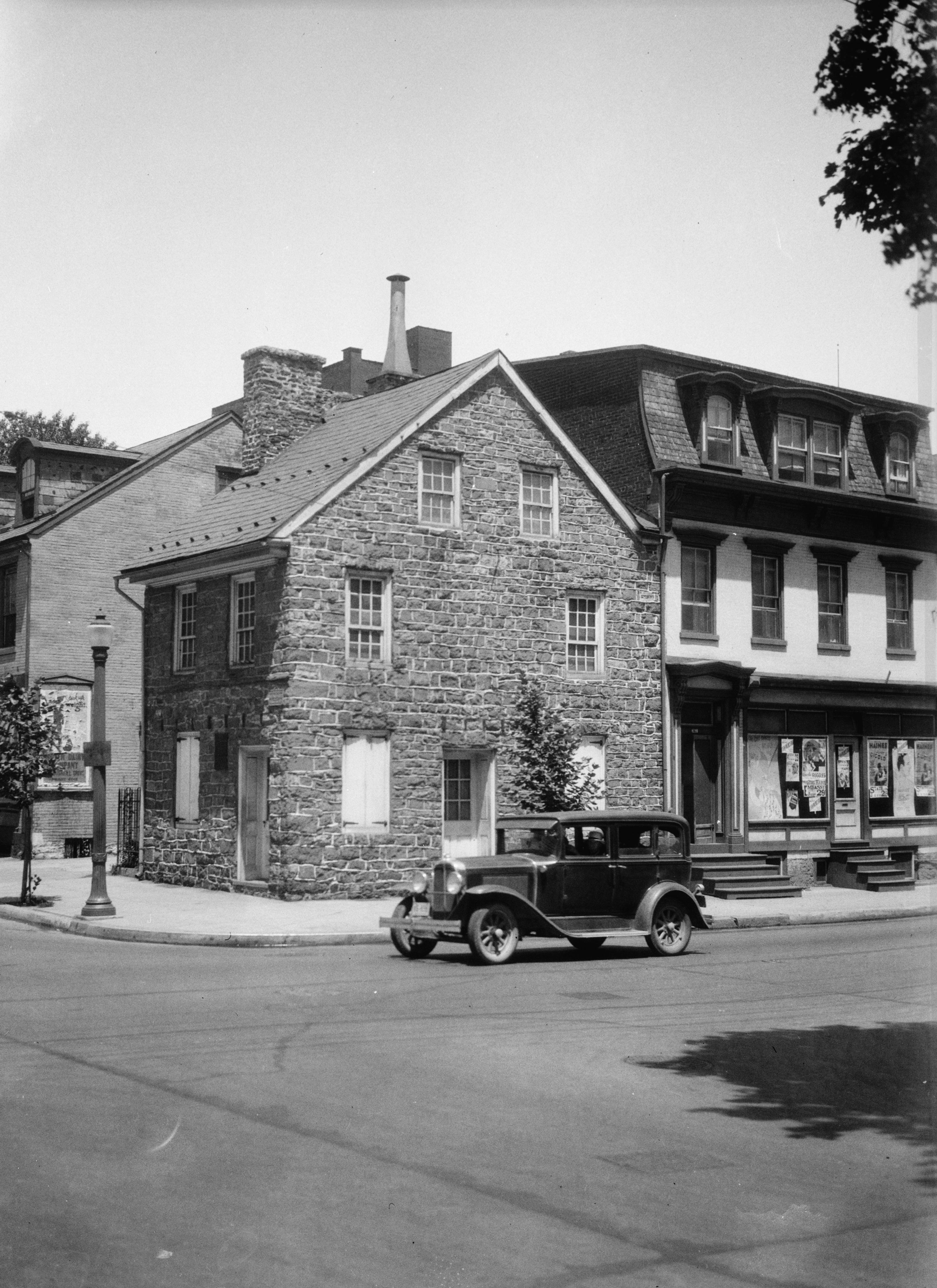
The Parsons-Taylor House, where Parsons lived prior to his death.

Even after his resignation as Surveyor-General, Parsons continued working as a surveyor for Thomas Penn. In 1750, at the request of Penn, he and the new Surveyor-General Nicholas Scull surveyed and laid out the town of Easton, Pennsylvania. Parsons moved into the newly created town of Easton. Among the notable features of Parsons's design was the Great Square, which is today known as Center Square.

In 1751, four surveyors, John Watson and Parsons of Pennsylvania, and John Emory and Thomas Jones of Maryland, surveyed what would later be known as the Transpeninsular Line, the north-south border between what would become the states of Delaware and Maryland.

In 1755, Parsons was commissioned as a major under Lieut. Col. Conrad Weiser as raids from the French and Indian War grew closer to Easton. He helped care for displaced settlers and briefly oversaw the city's defenses.

In early 1757, Parsons's house, which would later be known as the Parsons-Taylor House was completed. He grew ill and his health declined, so he spent the summer at the shore before returning home to Easton. On 22 or 17 December 1757, Parsons died.

Parsons was buried at the German Reformed Church Cemetery in Easton, which was later cleared to make way for the Easton Area Public Library. His grave still stands outside the front of the library.
