= London Coffee House (Philadelphia) =

Coordinates: 39.94945°N 75.14223°W

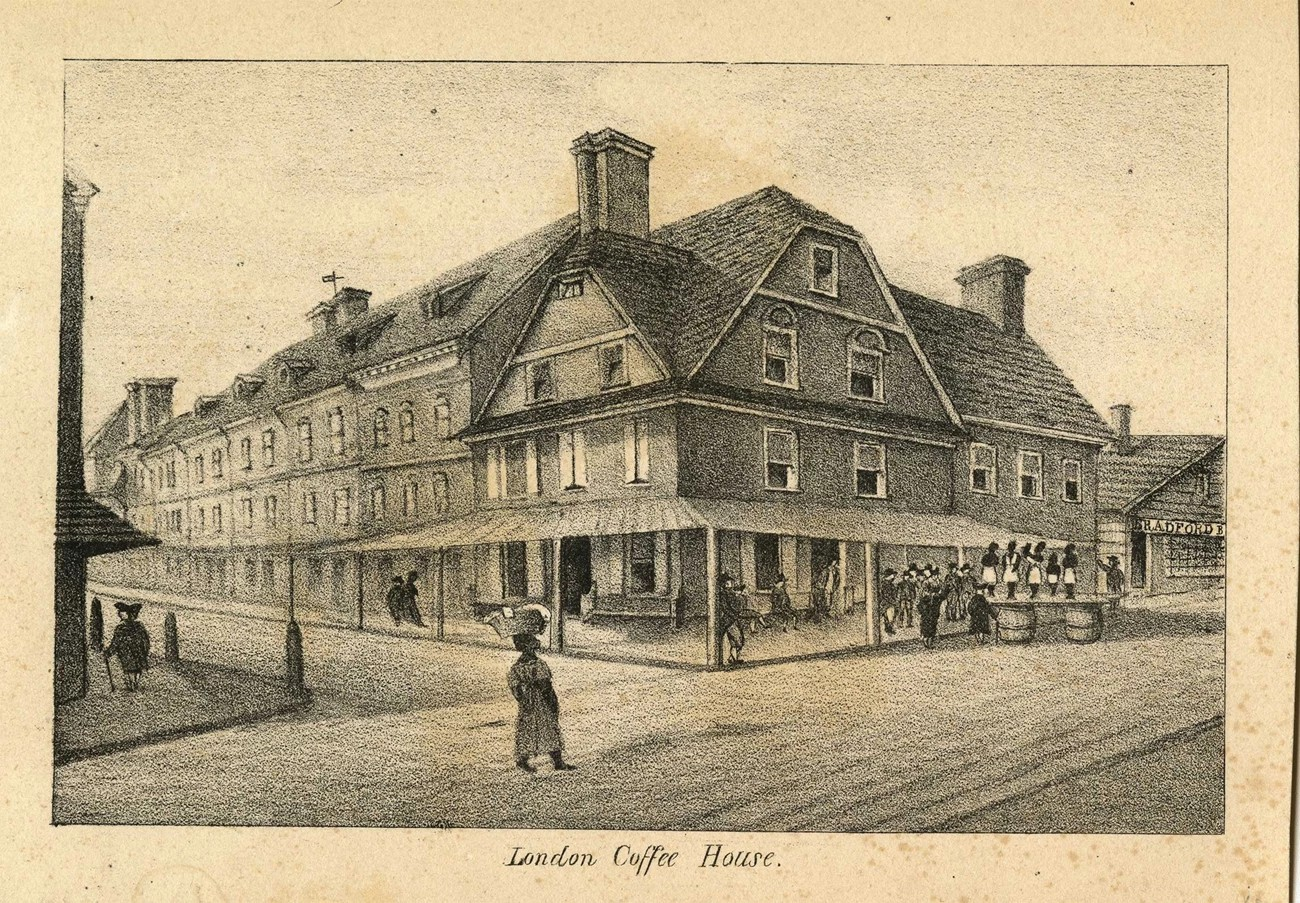
An 1830 lithograph of the London Coffee House by William L. Breton

London Coffee House, often called the Old London Coffee House, was a Philadelphia coffee house and merchants exchange in the colonial-era Province of Pennsylvania. Located at the southwest corner of Market (formerly High Street) and Front Streets, it was one block west of the Delaware River waterfront. The coffeehouse was the scene of political and commercial activity, and was the site of slave auctions of Black captives recently arrived from Africa.

Pennsylvania's 1780 Gradual Abolition Act made it illegal to import additional enslaved Africans into the state, but the law was a compromise that freed only the future children of those already enslaved in Pennsylvania.

== History ==
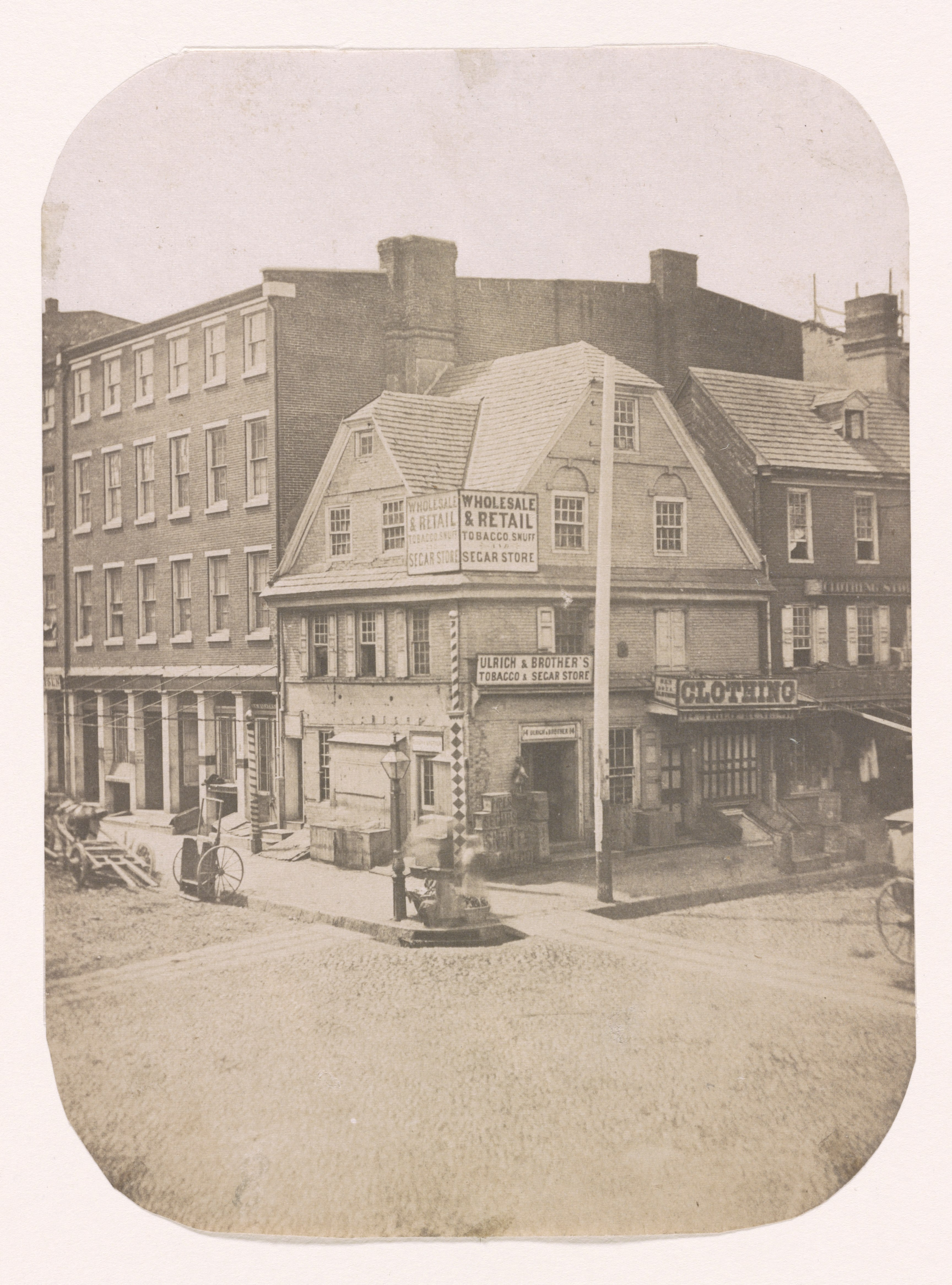
The Old London Coffee House building in 1854

Opened by William Bradford in 1754, the London Coffee House had been built with funds provided by more than 200 Philadelphia merchants, and it soon became their meeting place.

At the London Coffee Shop, merchants, ship masters, and others talked business and made deals that they often sealed with nothing more than a simple handshake. The governor of Pennsylvania and other colonial officials also frequented the coffee house, where they held court in their own private booths.

It was named the London coffee house, the second house in Philadelphia to bear that title. The building had stood since 1702, when Charles Reed, later mayor of Philadelphia, put it up on land which he bought from Letitia Penn, daughter of William Penn. Bradford was the first to use the structure for coffee house purposes. Many real estate lots were offered over pots of coffee.

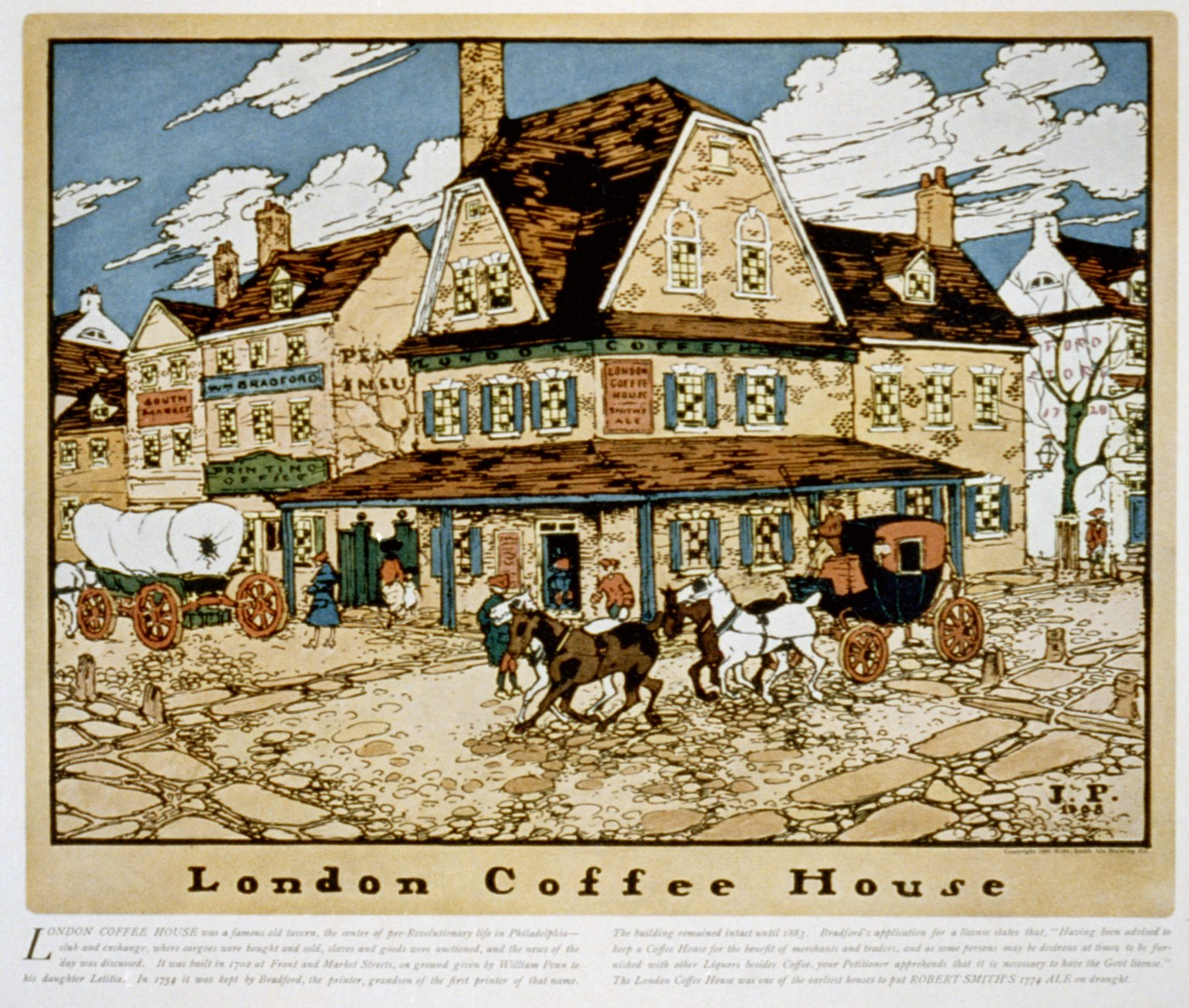
A 1908 illustration of the London Coffee House in its 18th century heyday

Shuttered in the aftermath of the British occupation of Philadelphia in 1777 and 1778, the London Coffee House reopened in 1783. But the 1780s were a difficult time in which to establish or revive a business in the city. In 1791, unable to weather the economic hardship, the London Coffee House was converted into a residence and general store. After 1883, the building was permanently demolished.
