= William Bradford (printer, born 1663) =

Early English-born printer in North America

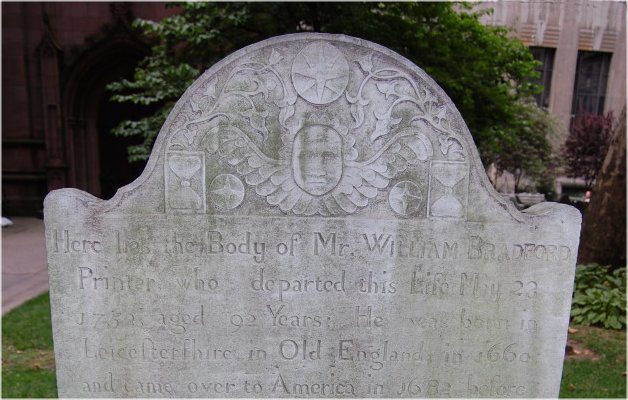
- William Bradford gravesite
- Born: May 20, 1663; Barwell, Leicestershire, England
- Died: May 23, 1752 (aged 89); New York City, British America
- Resting place: Trinity Church Cemetery
- Occupation: Printer
- Spouse: Elizabeth Sowel
- Children: Andrew Bradford
- Relatives: William Bradford (grandson)

William Bradford (May 20, 1663 – May 23, 1752) was an early American colonial printer and publisher in British America. Bradford is best known for establishing the first printing press in the Middle Colonies of the Thirteen Colonies, founding the first press in Pennsylvania in 1685 and the first press in New York in 1693. Bradford operated continuously printing establishments for sixty-two years, heading a family that would include printers and publishers for 140 years. He was also known for controversies regarding freedom of the press. Starting his printing career in London, Bradford emigrated to America in 1685. He established, with others, the first paper mill to appear in the Thirteen American Colonies.

Throughout his career, Bradford printed and published thousands of titles. In addition to his print shops in the province of Pennsylvania, the province of New York, the province of New Jersey, he also had five different locations in New York City. Printing almanacs, newspapers, books, pamphlets, broadsides, blank forms, paper money, legal documents, colonial laws, and religious material, Bradford was also the public printer for the province of New York and province of New Jersey.

== Early life ==
William Bradford was born on May 20, 1663, to William and Ann Bradford in the village of Barwell in Leicestershire, England. Bradford apprenticed outside the family to learn a trade, as was customary at the time. His trainer was Andrew Sowel (some sources spell Sowle or Sorole), the foremost Quaker printer in London, who printed in the Crooked Billet in Holloway Lane at Shoreditch. Bradford started working for Sowel around 1680 and, by December 3, 1684, he had mastered the trade and was freed from his apprenticeship. Bradford married Sowel's eldest daughter, Elizabeth, on April 28, 1685. Sowel arranged for the two to join William Penn in his new colony in North America with a letter of recommendation from George Fox, founder of the Quakers, to become the colonial printer.

== Career ==
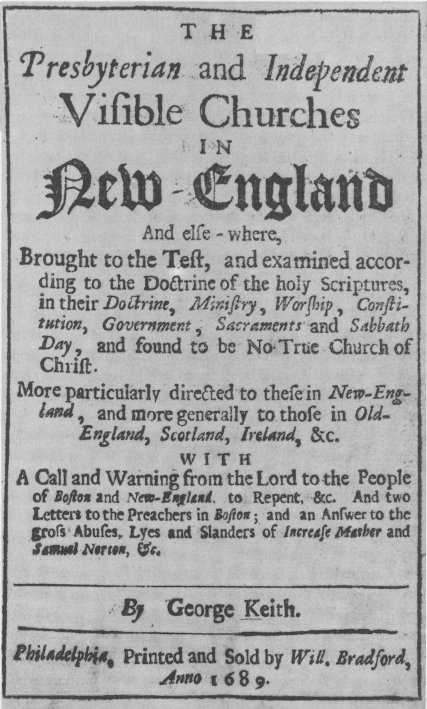
Visible Churches 1689 composed by George Keith, printed by William Bradford

William and Elizabeth Bradford arrived in America sometime in November 1685 and settled at a location near where Philadelphia was eventually laid out. Bradford then established Pennsylvania's first printing press, likely in the Chester or Burlington area. His first publication was an almanac, Kalendarium Pennsilvaniense compiled by Samuel Atkins, Student in the Mathamaticks and Astrology. Bradford advertised it as available to purchase near Philadelphia in Pennsilvania on December 28, 1685.

After an incident with his printing press, Bradford was told not to print anything unless it was approved by the Pennsylvania Provincial Assembly council.

In 1688, he printed Temple of Wisdom, the first full-sized book released in the Middle Colonies.

Bradford was living in Philadelphia by 1689 and had established a bookstore. He published a booklet in 1689 composed by Quaker missionary George Keith titled The Presbyterian and Independent Visible Churches in New England. Historian Isaiah Thomas owned a copy of the book that he claimed was the oldest known book printed in Philadelphia. According to book dealer historian William S. Reese, it is one of the first books printed in America. In that year Joseph Growdon, a member of the Pennsylvania Provincial Assembly council, hired Bradford to print William Penn's original charter for the province. The new Pennsylvania governor John Blackwell was outraged and reprimanded him. Bradford argued that he printed what he received. In reprimanding the publishing of the original charter, authorities attempted to deny the people of Pennsylvania knowledge of the rights and privileges afforded them under their laws.

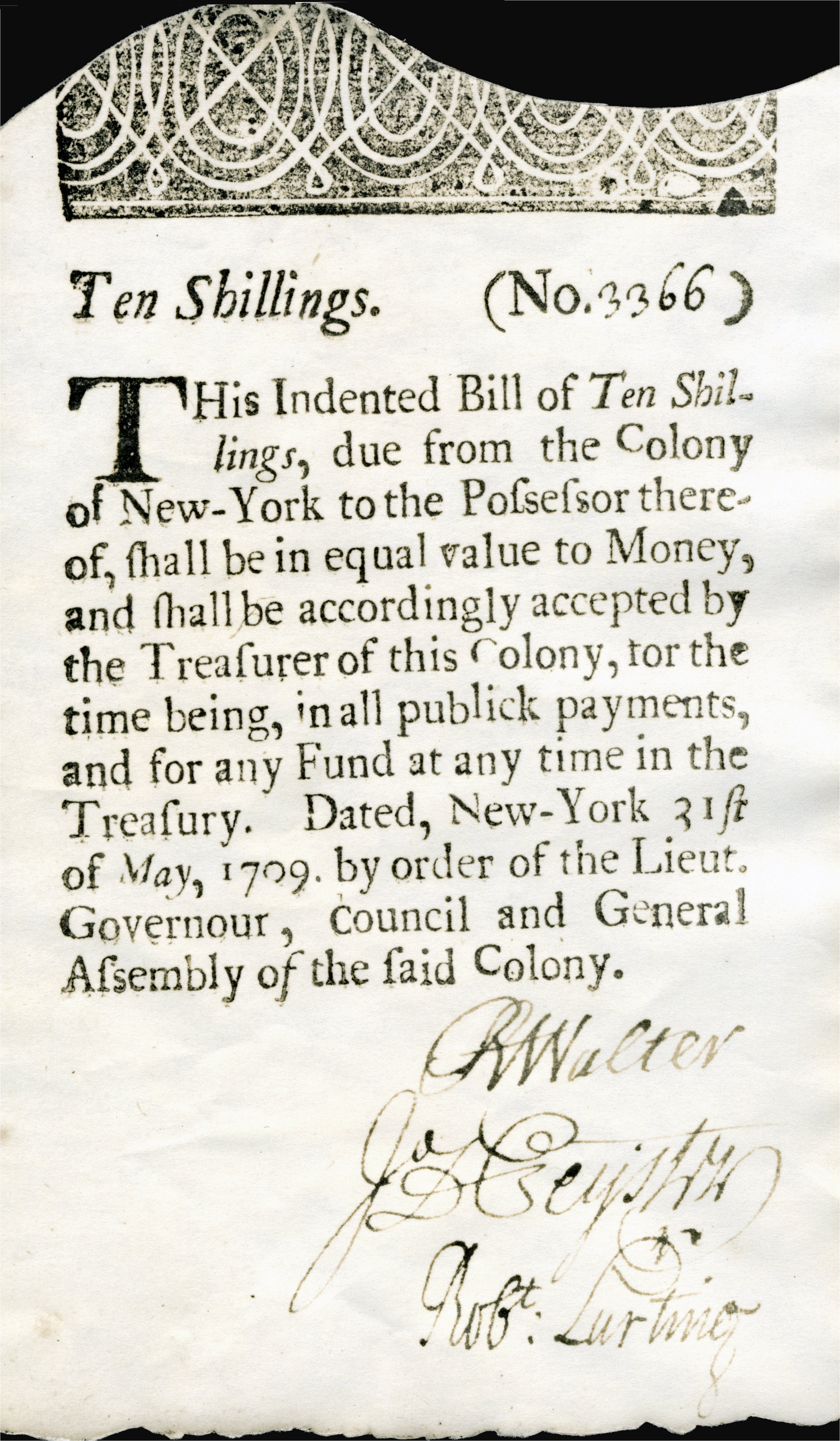
Bradford was responsible for printing the very first issue (May 31, 1709) of paper currency for the province of New York.

In 1690, Bradford, partnered with a newly arrived German paper maker, William Rittenhouse, and several merchants, and established the first paper mill in America along a creek in Roxborough, Pennsylvania. He had sent his wife and two infant sons to England and was making preparations to follow, to become the replacement printer for Sowel who had died, with plans to take over his business there.

It wasn't until he had moved to New York later did he have enough business to contract with the managing partners of the paper mill to get preferential terms on products. The mill was the only paper manufacturer in the Thirteen Colonies until 1710. It was followed by hundreds of paper mills constructed in the United States by 1832.

In 1692, Bradford printed thirteen of Keith's writings, including An Appeal from the Twenty-Eight Judges to Spirit of Truth, which the authorities construed as rebellious against the local government. Bradford was arrested, tried, and jailed for printing without a trade name imprint, a violation of the Licensing of the Press Act 1662. This was America's first trial regarding freedom of the press.

He later printed works without a printer's name or place of publication. One of note was the first book in New York City, "New-England Persecution Transmitted to Pennsylvania" authored by Keith and with some words in Hebrew type.

Bradford was the governor's only printer in the province of New York for three decades until 1723. He began publishing their first newspaper, the New-York Gazette in 1725, which was published weekly.

== Later life and death ==
Bradford remained as publisher of the New-York Gazette, printing it until he retired. In 1727, he took James Parker as an apprentice for an eight-year term. In 1731, Bradford's first wife died and afterwards he married a widow named Smith. In 1734, his former apprentice, John Peter Zenger, was brought to court for libel, but Bradford remained out of the case.

Bradford is interred in the Trinity Churchyard Cemetery on Wall Street in Manhattan where his tombstone still stands reading:

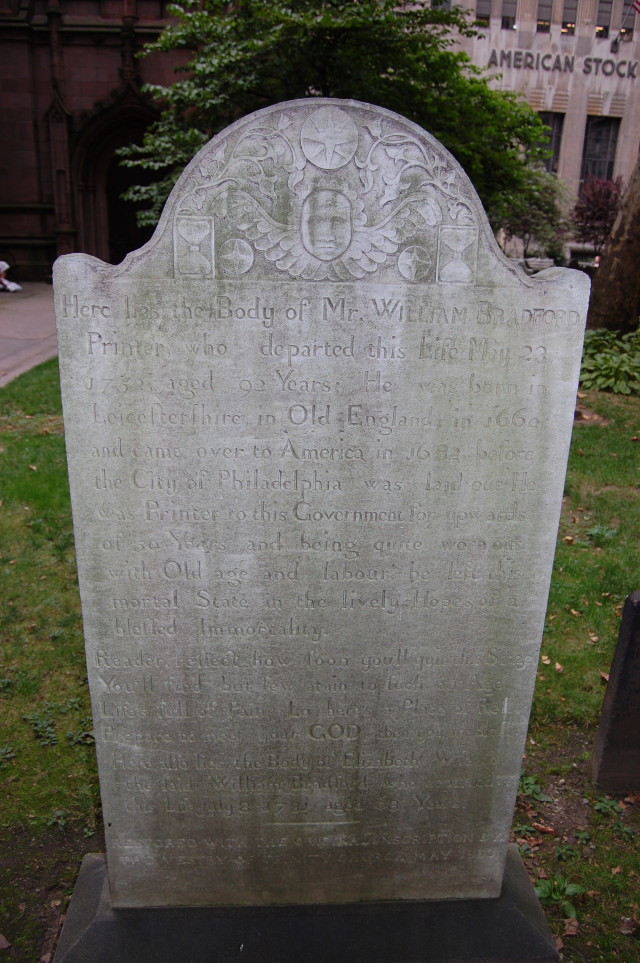
William Bradford tombstone

Here lies the body of Mr. William Bradford,
Printer, who departed this life May 23, 1752,
aged 92 Years. He was born in Leicester in
Old England in 1660 and came over
to America in 1682, before the city of
Philadelphia was laid out. He was printer
to this government for upwards of 50 years
and being quite worn out with old age and
labour he left this mortal State in the
lively Hopes of a better Immortality.
Reader, reflect how soon you'll quit this stage,
You'll find but few attain to such an age;
Life's full of pain; lo, here's a place to rest;
Prepare to meet your God, then you are blest.
Here also lies the body of Elizabeth,
wife to the said William Bradford, who departed
this life July 8, 1731, aged 68 years.

== Bradford family printing legacy ==
Bradford's wife Elizabeth gave birth to their first child, Andrew in 1686, who, along with his wife Cornelia Smith Bradford, were early American printers. Andrew published the first newspaper in colonial Philadelphia. William Jr, the brother of Andrew, was a printer and seaman. Bradford's grandson, William Bradford became a well-known printer during the American Revolution for the Continental Congress. The Bradford Family Papers (1620–1906) are deposited at the Historical Society of Pennsylvania. Bradford established printing and publishing businesses that operated for 140 years from 1685 until 1825. He trained several apprentices that including John Peter Zenger, James Parker, Henry DeForest, and his son Andrew Bradford.

== See also ==
- Early American publishers and printers

Other early American publishers and printers:

- David Hall (publisher)
- William Goddard (publisher)
- John Holt (publisher)

== Bibliography ==
- Bidwell, John (2013). American Paper Mills, 1690-1832. Dartmouth College Press. ISBN 9781611683165.
- Bishop, John (1861). History of American Manufactures 1608 to 1860. E. Young. OCLC 797286586.
- Bulen, Henry Lewis (1925). The American Collector. Collector Publishing Company. OCLC 1077894040.
- Dyer, Alan (1982). Biography of James Parker. Whitston Publishing Company, Incorporated. ISBN 978-0-87875-202-7.
- Hildeburn, Charles R. (1969). Sketches of Printers in Colonial New-York. Gale Research Company. OCLC 493937906.
- Johns, David L. (1992). Convincement and disillusionment: printer William Bradford and the Keithian controversy in colonial Philadelphia. Kent State University. OCLC 27416154.
- Murphy, Henry Cruse (1884). Library of the Late Henry C. Murphy. Geo. A. Leavitt & Company. OCLC 1026969302.
- McMurtrie, Douglas (1936). History of America printing / The Story of the Introduction of the Press and of Its History and Influence During the Pioneer Period in Each State of the Union · Volume 2. R.R. Bowker Company. OCLC 1060556328.
- Selby, Shawn (2018). Shaping North America. ABC–CLIO. ISBN 9781440836695.
- Spencer, Mark G. (2015). Encyclopedia of American Enlightenment. Bloomsbury Publishing. ISBN 9780826479693.
- Thomas, Isaiah (1970). The history of printing in America. Weathervane Books. ISBN 9780517172025. OCLC 1075157284.
- Wall, Alexander James (1964). William Bradford, Colonial Printer. The Davis Press. OCLC 16940938.
- Whittemore, Henry (1967). Genealogical to Early Settlers. Genealogical Publishing Company. ISBN 9780806303789.
