= Andrew Bradford =

American journalist

Andrew Bradford (1686 – November 24, 1742) was an early American printer in colonial Philadelphia. He published the first newspaper in Philadelphia, The American Weekly Mercury, beginning in 1719, as well as the first magazine in America in 1741.

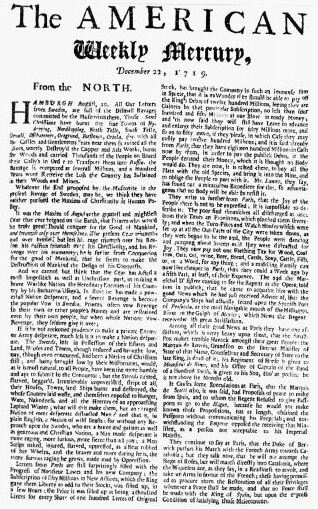
American Weekly Mercury, 1719

== Life and career ==
He was the son of a printer, and grandson of two others. He was born to William and Elizabeth Sowle Bradford in Philadelphia. In 1692, the family moved to New York, and there he learned the printing trade from his father. In 1709, Andrew Bradford was listed as a printer in New York; that year, he declined an offer from Rhode Island to become that colony's printer.

He returned to Philadelphia in 1712 and opened his own print shop. On December 22, 1719, he began publication of The American Weekly Mercury. This was the first newspaper in Philadelphia and enjoyed a wide circulation. He also taught the print business to his nephew William Bradford and for a time employed Benjamin Franklin when Franklin first came to Philadelphia, introduced by Bradford's father William. Franklin would go on to establish a rival printing press and newspaper, the Pennsylvania Gazette, in Philadelphia. On February 13, 1741, Bradford published the first issue of the American Magazine, the first magazine to be published in America — beating out Franklin for the honor by three days.

Throughout the 1720s, Bradford published political pamphlets critical of the local government, denouncing its "sinking credit" and supporting freedom of the press. He also published "Busy-Body" essays, criticisms of the colonial government penned by Franklin and Joseph Breintnall, in the Mercury. For these political actions, Bradford was brought before a council, censured several times, and jailed once.

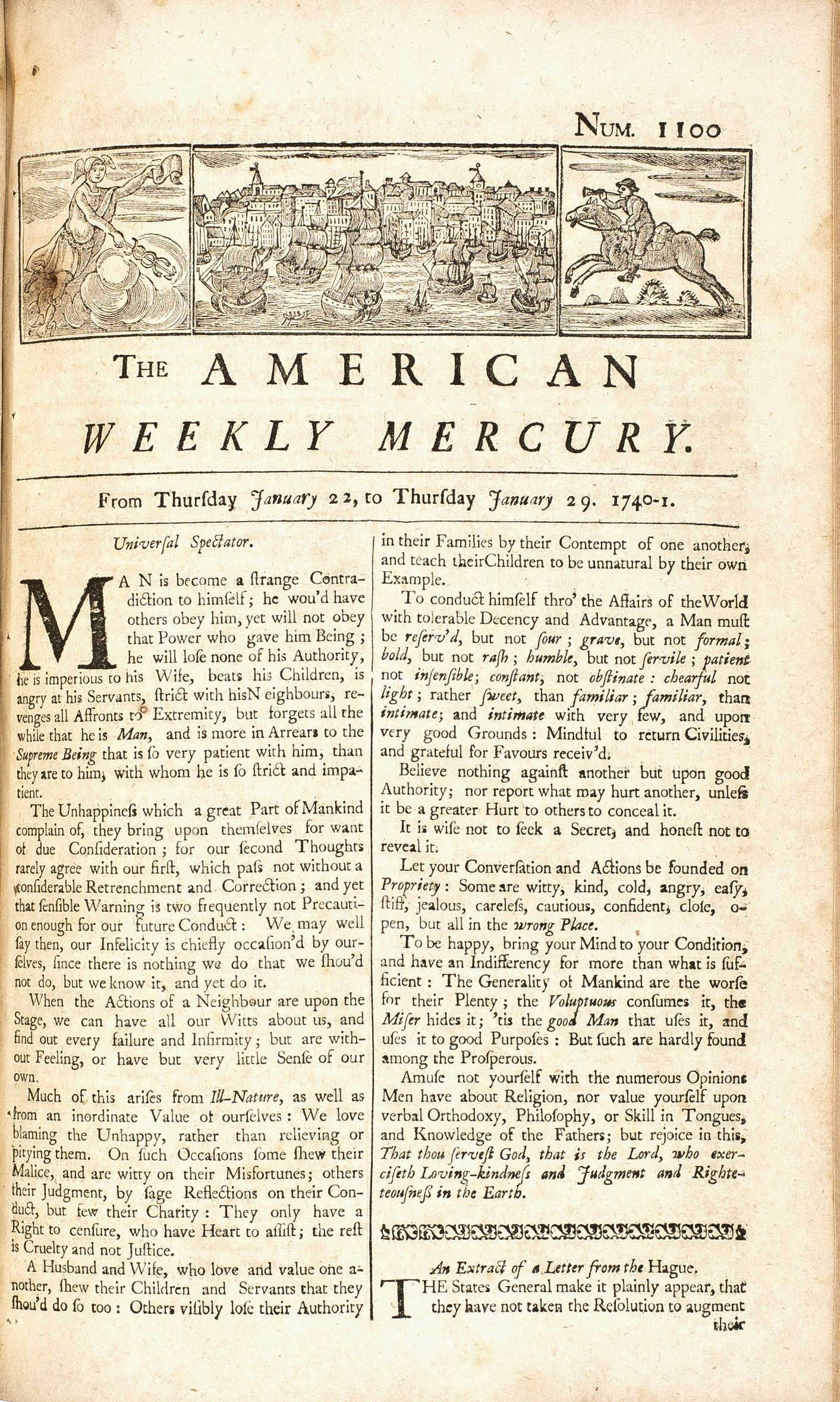
The American Weekly Mercury, January 22, 1740

Bradford's first wife was Dorcas Boels, who died in 1739. Bradford then married Cornelia Smith, who took over his print shop and newspaper upon his death in 1742.

== Citations ==
=== Bibliography ===
- Jones, Horatio G. (1869). An address delivered at the annual meeting of the Historical society of Pennsylvania. Philadelphia, King & Baird, printers. p. 25.
- Thomas, Isaiah (1810). The history of printing in America. OL 25399626M.
- The Bradford Family Papers (1620-1906), held at the Historical Society of Pennsylvania
