= The Drinker's Dictionary =

1737 list of phrases describing drunkenness

The Drinker's Dictionary is a list of 228 "round-about phrases" to describe drunkenness. It was published on January 6, 1737 (1736 Old Style) in The Pennsylvania Gazette. The Pennsylvania Gazette publication is attributed to Benjamin Franklin and appears in his memoirs; however, a very similar wordlist appears in the New England Weekly Journal on July 6, 1736, and differences between the two suggest earlier origins by a different author. Franklin deemed drunkenness as a vice that could never be a virtue, so various terms and phrases were created to mask the inappropriateness of the act.

== Bibliography ==
- Franklin, Benjamin, Franklin, William Temple, Duane, William, Memoirs of Benjamin Franklin, volume 2, New York: Derby & Jackson (1859), p. 496.
