= William Bradford (printer, born 1719) =

American printer (1719–1791)

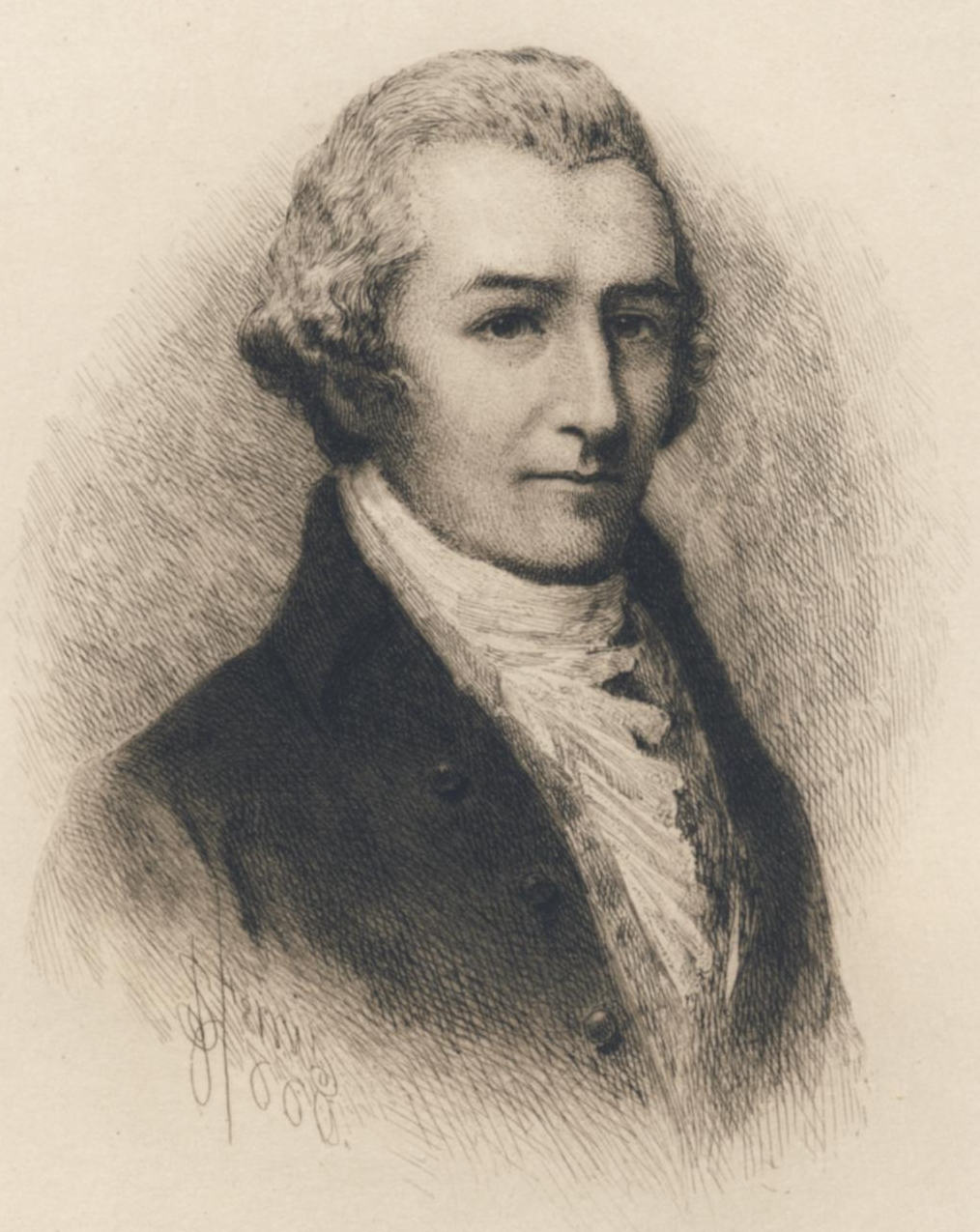
- A portrait of Bradford based on a portrait miniature in the possession of the Historical Society of Pennsylvania, published in the Pennsylvania Magazine of History and Biography in 1891
- Born: 1719; New York City, Province of New York, British America
- Died: September 25, 1791 (aged 72))
- Resting place: "Presbyterian grave-yard in Arch-street", Philadelphia Arch Street Presbyterian Churchyard, formerly at 1724 Arch Street, Philadelphia; 39°57′17.46″N 75°10′8.83″W
- Citizenship: American
- Occupations: Printer, soldier
- Relatives: Andrew Bradford (uncle); William Bradford (grandfather); William Bradford (son)

William Bradford (1719 – September 25, 1791) was a printer, soldier, and leader during the American Revolution from Philadelphia.

== Printer ==
Bradford was born in New York City in 1719, and was the grandson of the printer William Bradford. He was apprenticed to and was later a partner of his uncle Andrew Bradford in Philadelphia. This relationship ended in 1741.

He visited England that year, returning in 1742 with equipment to open his own printing firm and library.

Bradford was the publisher of The Pennsylvania Journal, the first issue of which appeared on December 2, 1742. In later years, each issue had the still-recognized image of the snake chopped into segments with the motto "Unite or Die". Variations of this logo were also used by Paul Revere, Benjamin Franklin, and others.

In 1754, he opened the London Coffee House in Philadelphia and began to write marine insurance. As a publisher and writer, he attacked many policies of the British government, and was especially vocal in his opposition to the Stamp Act in 1765.

The first Continental Congress met in Philadelphia in 1774, and Bradford was named as the official printer for the Congress. In this role, he printed the formal resolutions, broadsides, and documents such as the Declaration of Rights, that the Congress issued.

== Military career ==
When the American Revolutionary War started, Bradford left his business in his son's hands and, despite being middle aged, went into active military service with the Pennsylvania militia. He was made a major, and later promoted to colonel. He saw action at Trenton and Princeton, at Fort Billingsport, and at Fort Mifflin. Because the wound he received at the Battle of Princeton continued to trouble him, when British forces withdrew from Philadelphia he resigned from the militia and returned to the city.

== Later life and death ==
His son Thomas had continued The Pennsylvania Journal during his absence. Now they became partners, and over the years expanded their publishing house. After William's death on September 25, 1791, Thomas continued their enterprise. A second son, William (sometimes called William, Jr.), joined the Continental Army, became a lawyer and was later Chief Justice of the Pennsylvania Supreme Court and U. S. Attorney General. Thomas's son Samuel Fisher Bradford continued the family tradition and is noted for the American printing of Rees's Cyclopædia.

The following obituary of Bradford was published in The Maryland Herald on October 11, 1791:

PHILADELPHIA, Sept. 29.
Died, on Sunday morning in the 73d year of his age, Mr. William Bradford, many years the Editor of the Pennsylvania Journal, and Colonel of a regiment of militia during the late war. He was descended from one of the first settlers in Pennsylvania; and was one of four generations of printers, who have uniformly distinguished themselves, by devoting to the Press to the preservation and extension of the liberties of our country. This venerable Patriot took an early and active part in every scene of difficulty and danger which occurred during the American revolution—Fear had no place in his breast; nor did he ever in a single instance, betray or even disappoint the confidence which his fellow citizens placed in him—whether in the secret enterprizes of the cabinet, or in the open dangers of the field. His remains was interred on Monday afternoon in the Presbyterian grave-yard in Arch-street, attended by a large concourse of the inhabitants of the city, and particularly by the early and steady friends of the revolution, who can never recollect the important events of the year 1774, 1775, and 1776, without connecting them with the name of this Patriotic Citizen.

— Maryland Herald (MD), October 11, 1791, p. 3
