= Hugh Meredith =

Farmer and printer in British America

Hugh Meredith (c. 1697 - c. 1749) was a farmer and printer in the American colonies, who briefly had a partnership with Benjamin Franklin as publishers of the Pennsylvania Gazette.

Meredith was of Welsh descent and born outside Philadelphia, where he was a farmer. At the age of 30, he took an apprenticeship to learn printing. Franklin and Meredith worked under Samuel Keimer, and Meredith was an original member of the Junto club founded by Franklin.

Around 1728 the two formed a partnership, with Meredith's father providing half of the needed money for the venture. They bought Keimer's Universal Instructor in all Arts and Sciences: and Pennsylvania Gazette in 1729. By the next year, Franklin acted to buy out Meredith's interest. By May 1732 Franklin had acquired complete ownership of the Gazette.

In the summer of 1730 Meredith moved to the Welsh Tract settlement in the Cape Fear region of North Carolina, claiming on departure that he planned to "follow my old employment", which evidently meant farming. As part of their division of the business, Meredith asked for a new saddle.

In 1731, Franklin published two letters from Meredith in the Gazette, which described conditions in the North Carolina Welsh settlements.

It is likely that Meredith later returned to Pennsylvania, as Franklin lent him some money in 1739.
