= Parsons-Taylor House =

Historic house in Pennsylvania, United States

- U.S. National Register of Historic Places
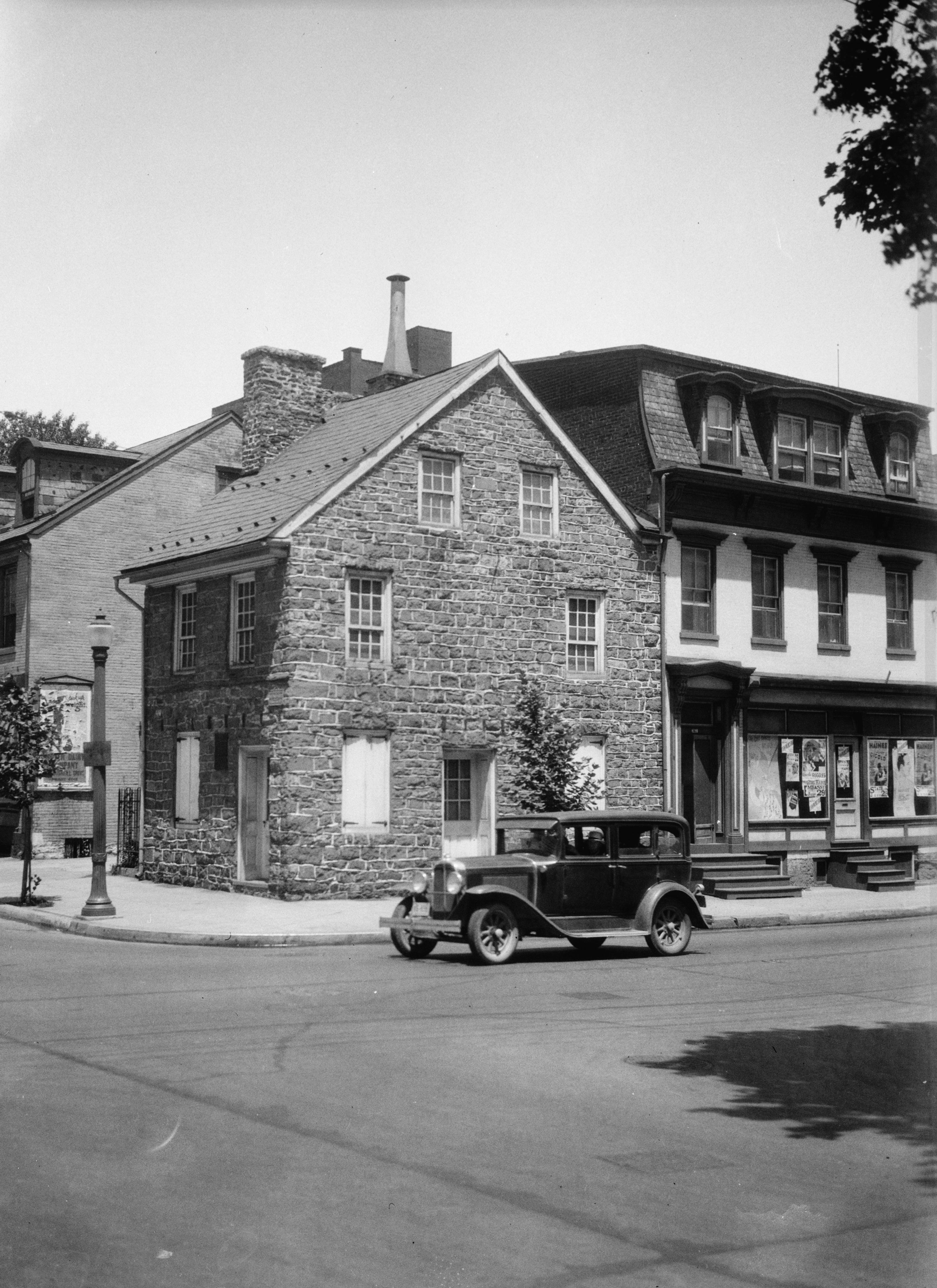
- Parsons-Taylor House, 1925

- Location within Pennsylvania Location within the United States
- Location: 4th and Ferry Sts., Easton, Pennsylvania
- Coordinates: 40°41′23″N 75°12′39″W
- Area: 0.1 acres (0.040 ha)
- Built: 1753–1757
- Architectural style: Georgian, Delaware Valley Georgian
- NRHP reference No.: 80003585
- Added to NRHP: August 22, 1980

The Parsons-Taylor House is a historic, American home that is located in Easton, Pennsylvania.

It was added to the National Register of Historic Places in 1980.

== History and architectural features ==
Built between 1753 and 1757, this historic structure is a 2 1/2-story, two-bay, stone dwelling that was designed in the Georgian style. The interior features a three-part circular stairway that connects the four levels of the home. The house was built for the surveyor who laid out the settlement if Easton William Parsons and later inhabited by Founding Father George Taylor (c. 1716–1781), who died there in 1781.

The house has been occupied by the George Taylor Chapter of the Daughters of the American Revolution since 1906.
