= Nicholas Scull II =

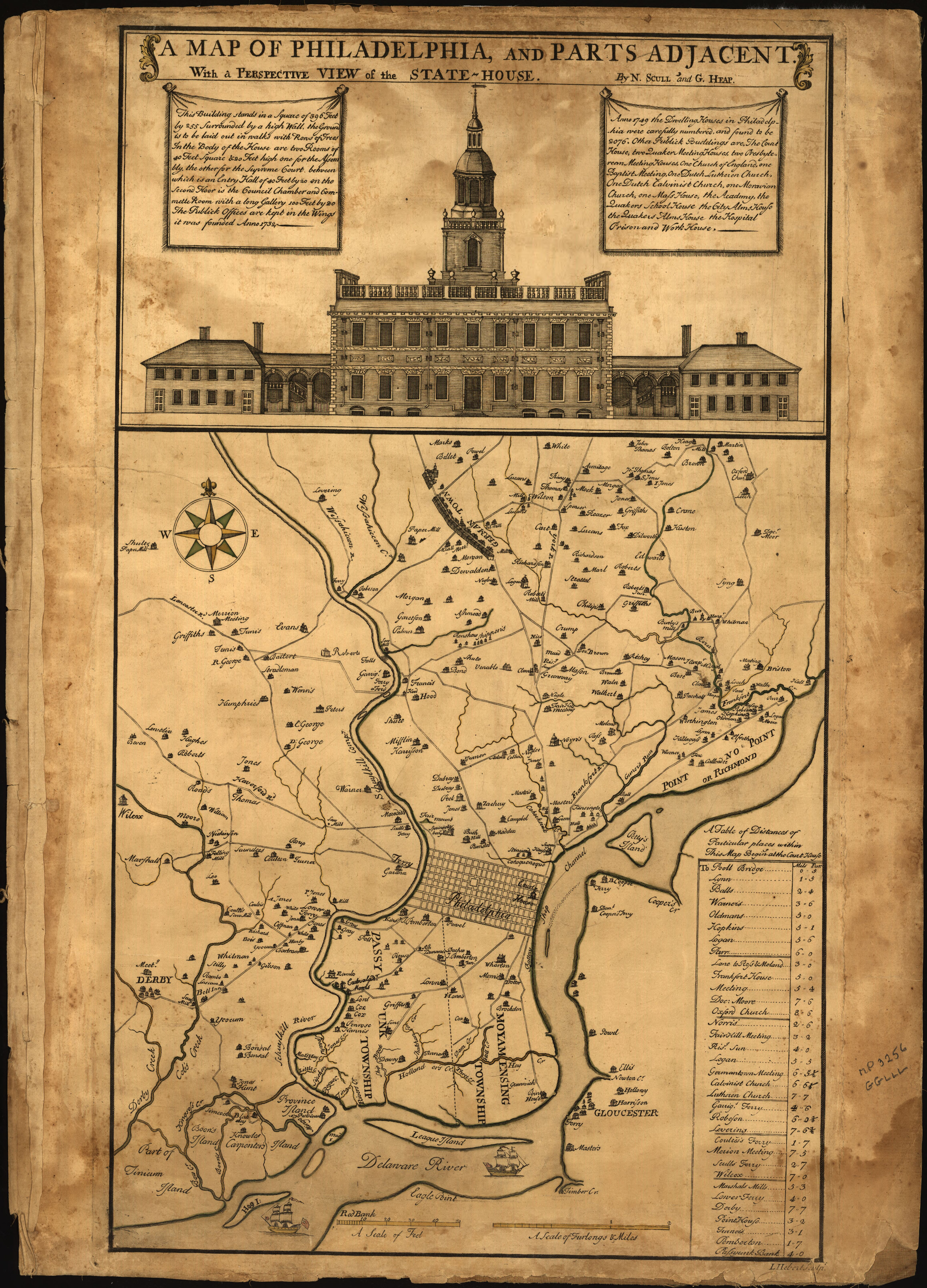
A Map of Philadelphia and Parts Adjacent, with a perspective view of the State-House (1752), by N. Scull and G. Heap

Nicholas Scull II (1687–1761) was an American surveyor and cartographer. He served as Surveyor General of Pennsylvania from 1748 to 1761.

== Early life ==
Nicholas Scull II was born in Philadelphia, Pennsylvania. His Irish-born father, surveyor Nicholas Scull, began laying out the path for the Old York Road in 1697, and Nicholas II assisted on this as a teen. Old York Road was the major route north through Philadelphia County, until the construction of North Broad Street in the 19th century. Nicholas II was about age 16 when his father died in 1703. He apprenticed under Pennsylvania's first Surveyor General, Thomas Holme, and also studied with surveyor Jacob Taylor. He was appointed the first Deputy Surveyor for Philadelphia County in 1719.

Scull was one of the twelve original members of The Junto, "a club for mutual improvement" founded by Benjamin Franklin in Autumn 1727. Franklin described him as "Nicholas Scull, a surveyor, afterward surveyor-general, who loved books and sometimes made a few verses," and noted that Scull was fluent in the local Lenape language.

== Career ==
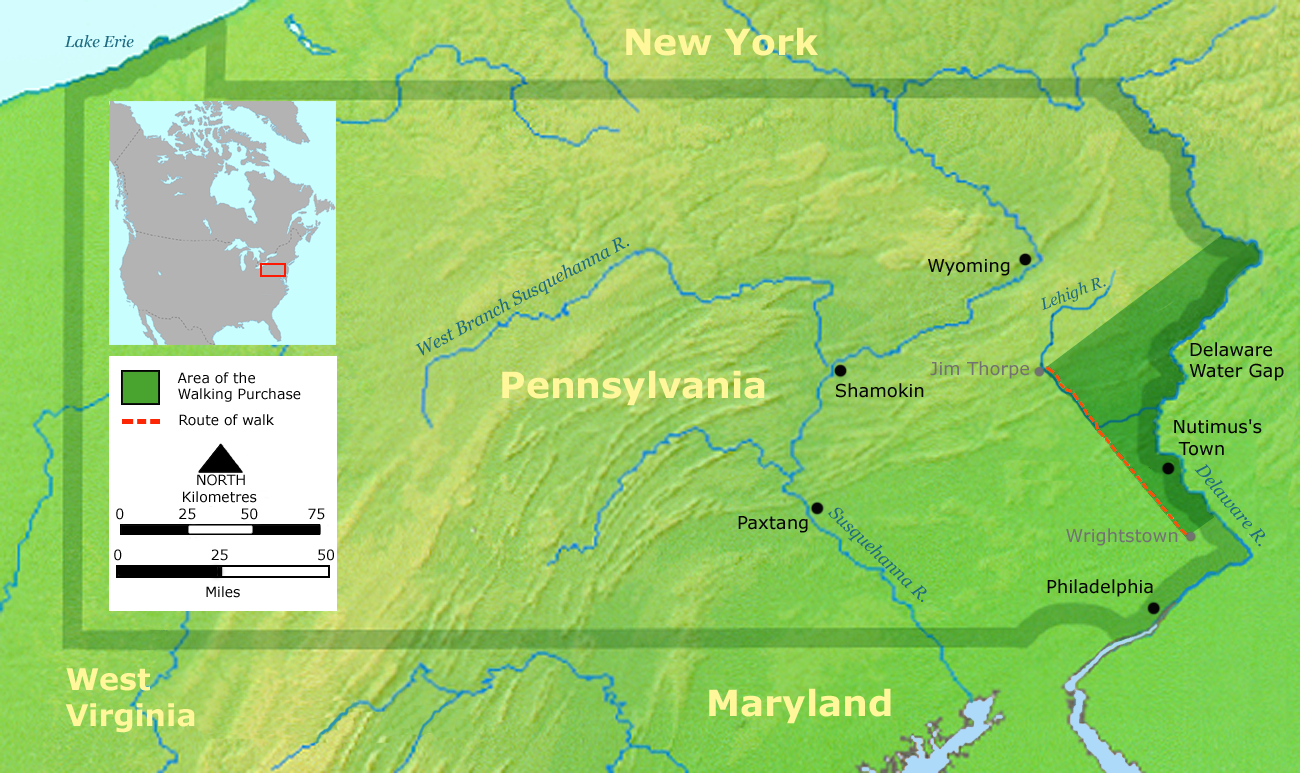
Area acquired by the Penn Family under the Walking Purchase of 1737. The northern Delaware River courses along northeast border between the colonial Province of Pennsylvania and West New Jersey in the Province of New Jersey (shaded)

In 1733, Scull was appointed Deputy Surveyor for Bucks and Philadelphia counties. His work included surveying the Schuylkill and Lehigh Rivers. He handled land disputes in the Delaware Water Gap region between Dutch, French, and early Pennsylvania settlers of other origins. He accompanied Surveyor General Benjamin Eastburn on the notorious Walking Purchase of 1737, a "land swindle," through which the Penn family claimed an area of 1,200,000 acres (4,860 km^{2}). Eastburn later hired Scull's son Edward as a surveyor.

Scull ran for Philadelphia County sheriff in 1744, and won. He served as sheriff until 1746, when he was asked to replace William Parsons as Surveyor General. Scull was formally appointed Surveyor General in 1748, and Edward Scull was appointed to the father's former position as Deputy Surveyor of Philadelphia and Bucks Counties.

As Surveyor General, Scull published multiple maps of the Philadelphia region, working at times with his wife's relative, George Heap (c.1715-1752). Heap's sketches for a prospect of Philadelphia were inspired by William Burgis, who created prospects of the cities of New York and Boston. Following Heap's premature death, Scull completed the Philadelphia prospect. Engraved and printed by Gerard Vandergucht in London in 1754, An East Prospect of the City of Philadelphia was printed from four copper plates. The four sheets could be trimmed and combined into a single image, that measured 20 in (51 cm) by 82 in (210 cm).

== Personal life ==
Coat of Arms of Nicholas Scull

Nicholas Scull II married Abigail Heap in 1708. Together they had a daughter, Mary; and three sons: Edward, John, and Nicholas III, who became surveyors. His daughter Mary married Captain Robert Callender, a fur trader in Carlisle, Pennsylvania.

Nicholas’s grandson was William Scull.

Scull died in 1761, and was buried in Whitemarsh Township, Pennsylvania.

== Notable works ==
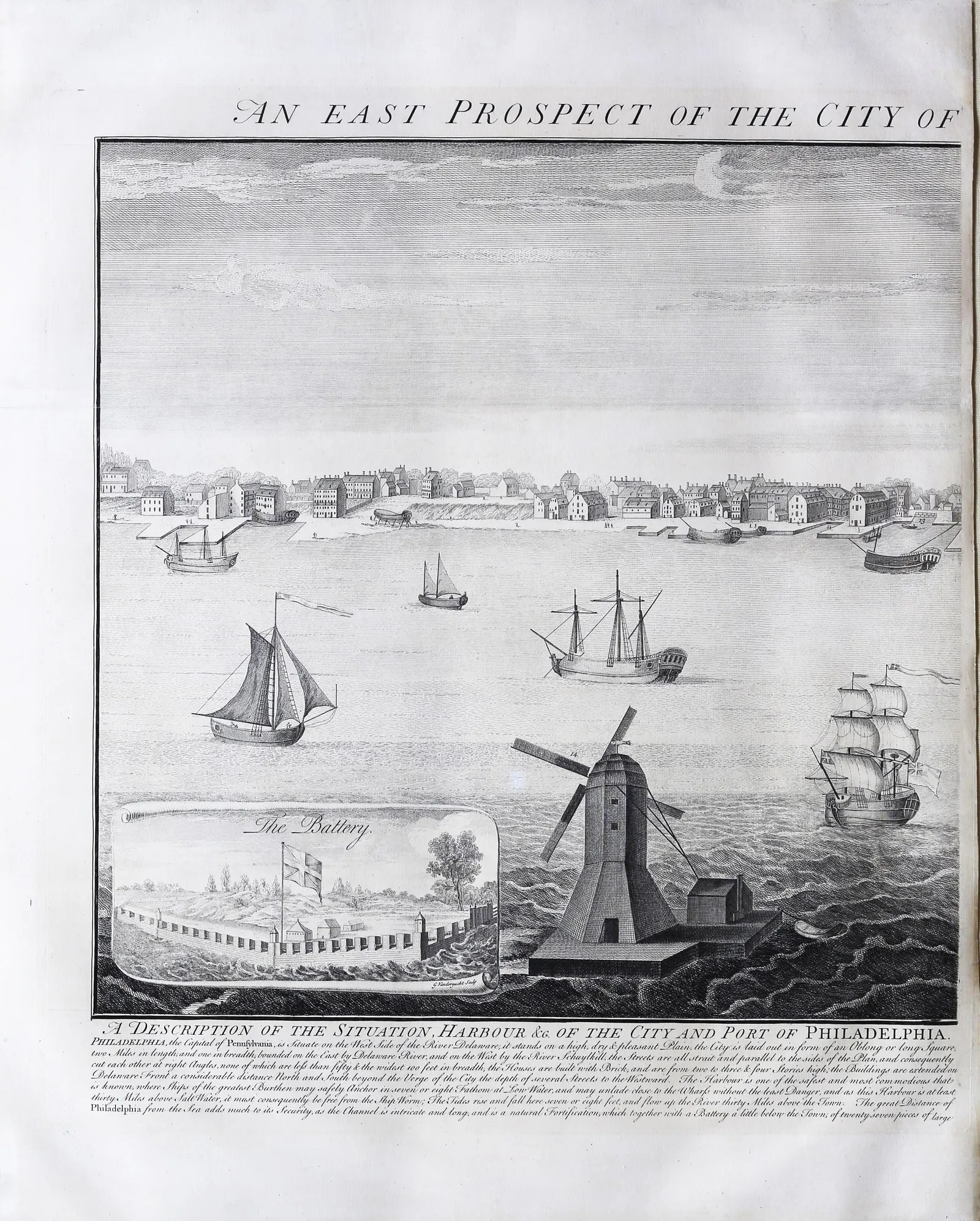
An East Prospect of the City

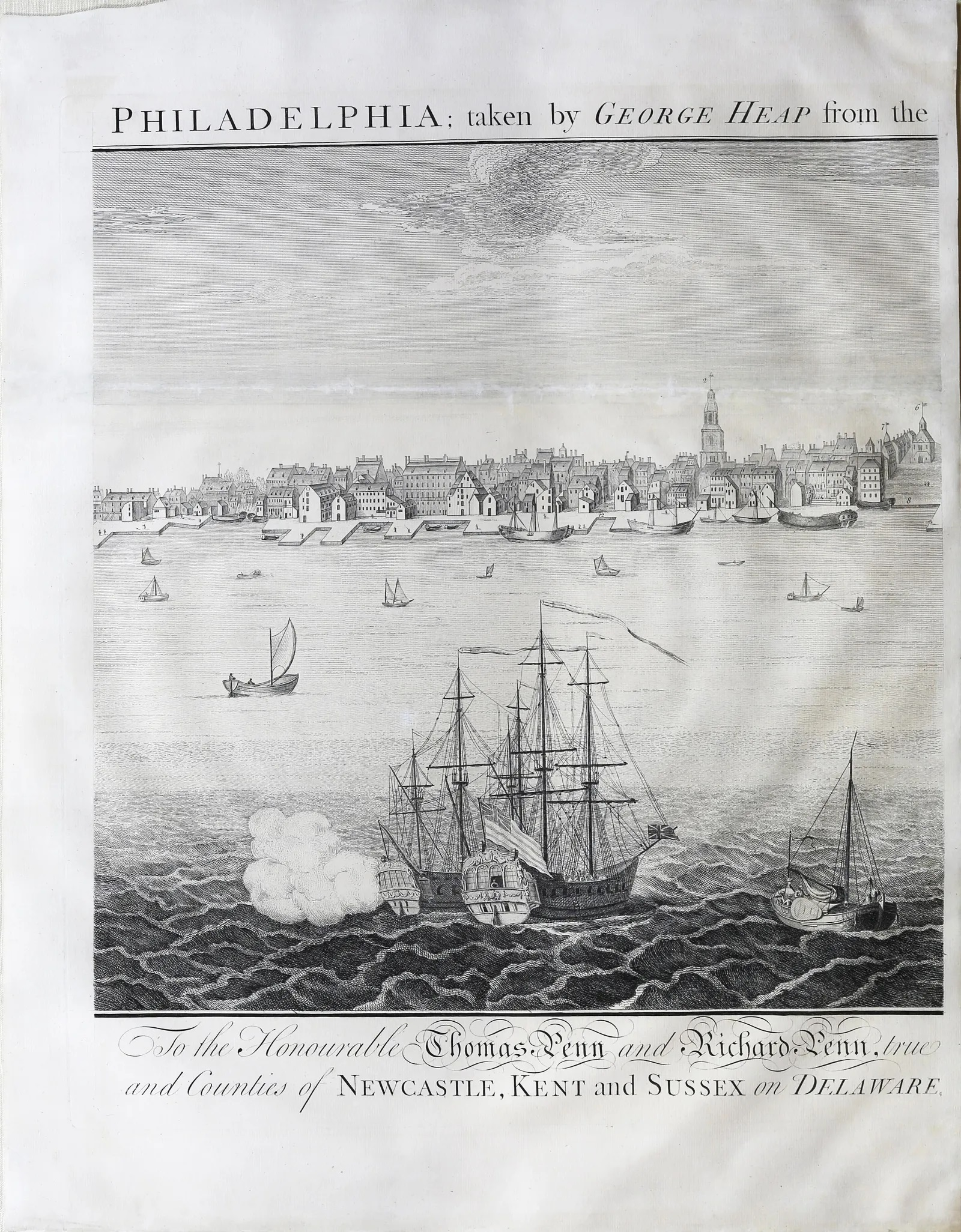
of Philadelphia (1754)

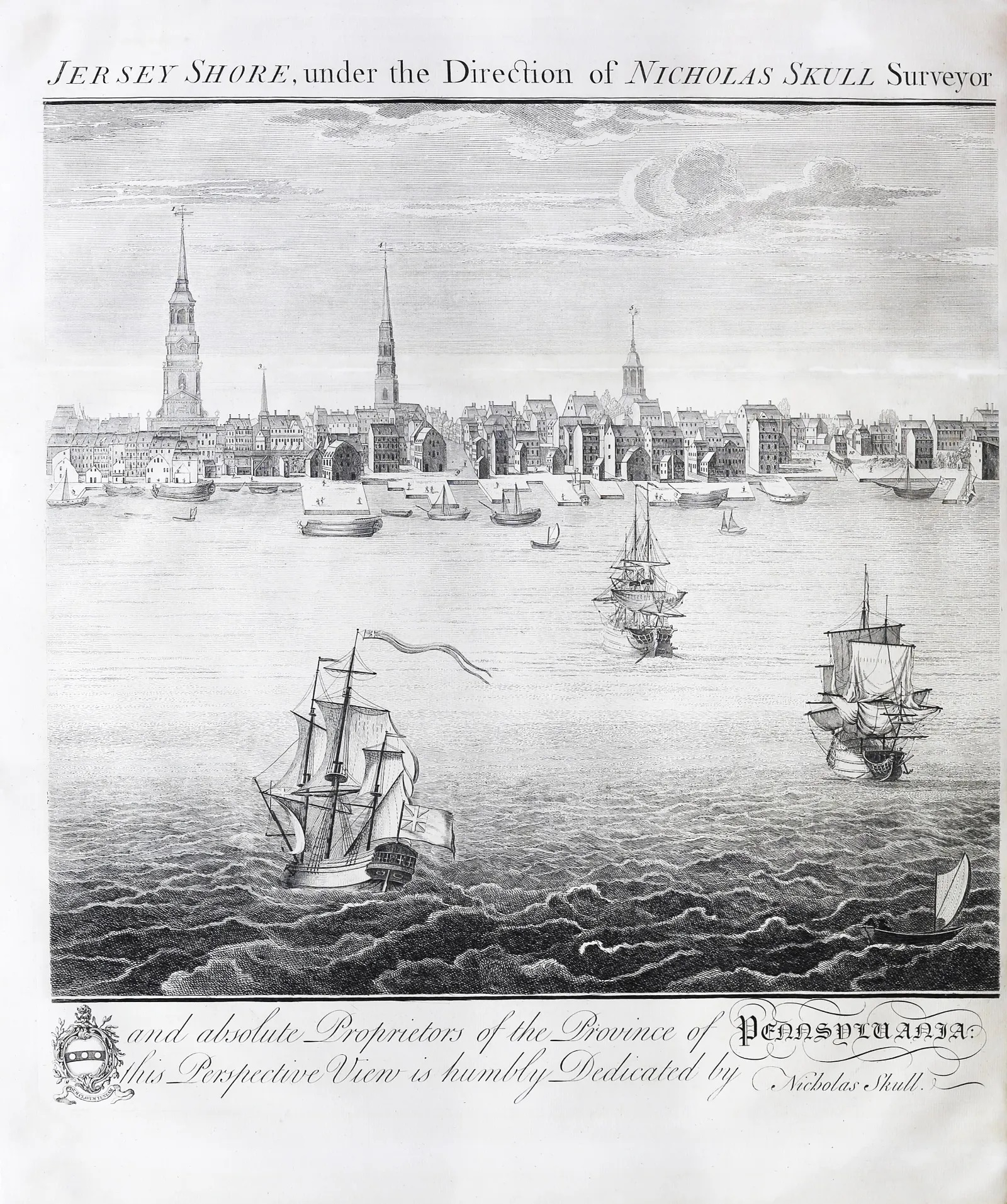
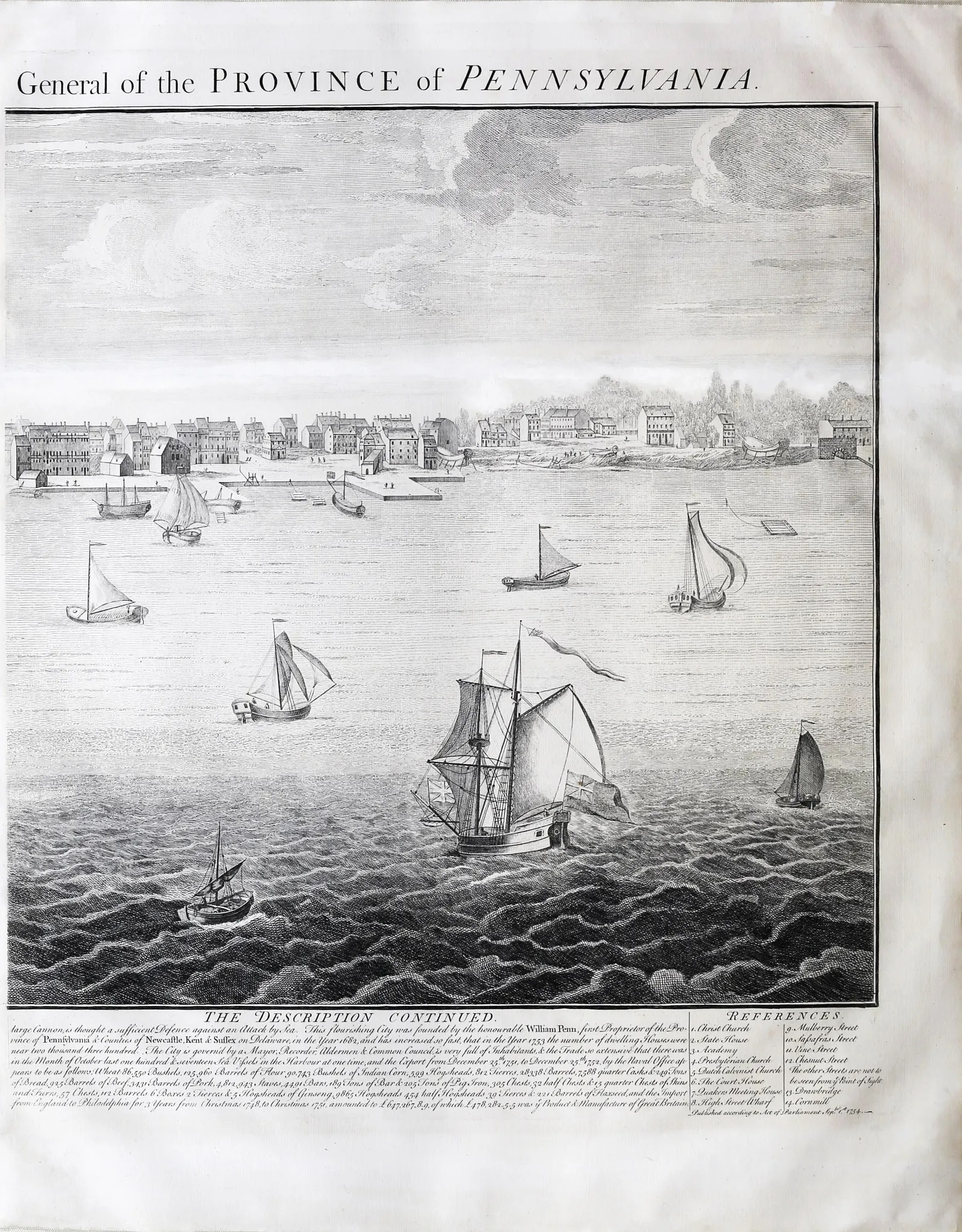
- A Map of Philadelphia and Parts Adjacent, 1752, by Nicolas Scull and George Heap, first edition, 1752, University of Pennsylvania
  - Scull & Heap's 1752 map of Philadelphia was adapted and republished by William Faden in London in 1777, during the American Revolution.
- An East Prospect of the City of Philadelphia; taken by George Heap from the Jersey Shore; under the direction of Nicholas Scull, Surveyor General of the Province of Pennsylvania (1754)
- To the Honourable Thomas Penn and Richard Penn, Esqrs., true & absolute proprietaries & Governours of the Province of Pennsylvania & counties of New-Castle, Kent & Sussex on Delaware this map of the improved part of the Province of Pennsylvania, 1759, Library of Congress
