= Cornelia Smith Bradford =

- Born: Cornelia Smith; New York City, New York
- Died: 1755; Philadelphia, Pennsylvania
- Occupations: Printer, editor

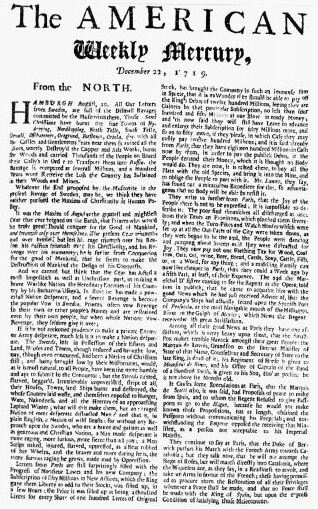
American Weekly Mercury, 1719

Cornelia Smith Bradford (died August 1755) was a printer and newspaper editor located in Philadelphia. She is one of only eleven American women known to have supported themselves as printers before the American Revolution.

== Life and career ==
Born Cornelia Smith in New York City (date unknown), Cornelia grew up in a family of comfortable means. She married Andrew Bradford, son of William Bradford, both printers. She was said to have been "remarkable for beauty and talents," though their marriage was said to be unhappy. Andrew owned a print shop in Philadelphia as well as the American Weekly Mercury newspaper, founded in 1719.

Upon Andrew's death, Cornelia took over his printing press, shop, and management of his newspaper. In 1742/3, she hired one Isaiah Warner as an assistant, but from 1744 until the last issue of the Mercury on May 22, 1746, Cornelia was the sole editor and printer. In addition the newspaper, her shop printed almanacs and various other publications. Cornelia was also a bookbinder and bookseller. She owned land in New York City, Philadelphia, and Germantown. In 1755, she died in Philadelphia and was buried in the Christ Church cemetery.

== See also ==
- List of women printers and publishers before 1800
