= Joseph Breintnall =

American journalist

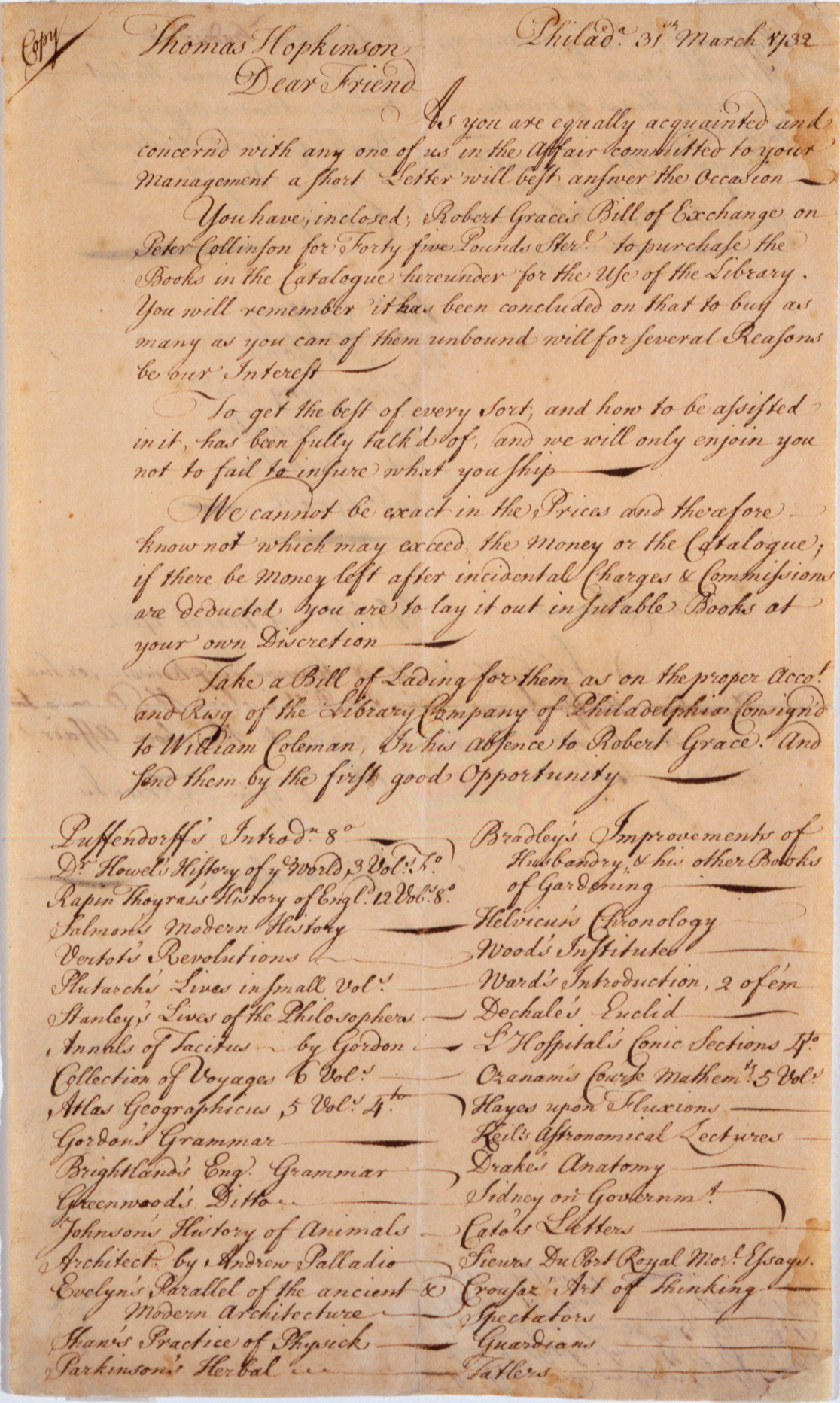
Letter from Joseph Breintnall to Thomas Hopkinson, 31 March 1732

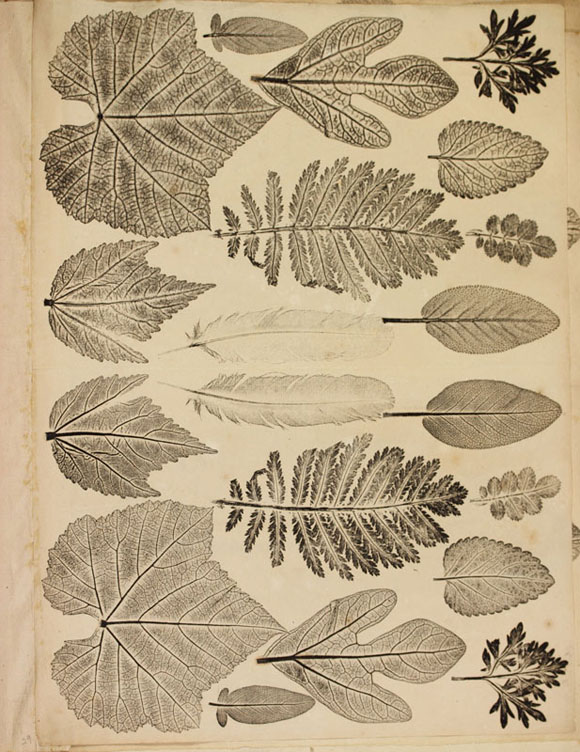
Early printed sample of American leaves made by Joseph Breintnall in the 1730s

Joseph Breintnall (died 1746) was an influential American merchant and amateur naturalist. He was the first Secretary of the Library Company of Philadelphia and the sheriff of Philadelphia from 1735 to 1738. His name is usually remembered alongside that of his friend and collaborator, Benjamin Franklin. An early member of Franklin's Junto, Breintnall co-authored a series of letters with Franklin, under the name of "The Busy-Body." The 32 letters were printed serially in Andrew Bradford's newspaper The American Weekly Mercury in 1729.

== Life and work ==
Breintnall was a copyist and a merchant who opened a public house called "The Hen and Chickens". He was married under the care of the Religious Society of Friends (Quakers) in 1723. His observations of the aurora borealis and his detailed account of being bitten by a rattlesnake circulated within the Royal Society in London through his correspondence with the Quaker botanist and Fellow of the Royal Society, Peter Collinson. Breintnall also experimented in printing techniques, especially that of Nature printing. His name appears several times in the records of Philadelphia Monthly Meeting of Friends. Breintnall was sheriff of Philadelphia from 1735 to 1738. He died in 1746 and left no will.

In his Autobiography Benjamin Franklin, writes that Breintnall was,

a copyer of deeds for the scriveners, a good-natur’d, friendly, middle-ag’d man, a great lover of poetry, reading all he could meet with, and writing some that was tolerable; very ingenious in many little Nicknackeries, and of sensible Conversation.

=== First Secretary of the Library Company of Philadelphia (1731–1746) ===
Breintnall was the first Secretary of the Library Company of Philadelphia, a position he held from the company's founding in 1731, until his untimely drowning in the Delaware River on March 16, 1746. The Library Company is America's first successful lending library and one of its oldest cultural institutions. Benjamin Franklin founded the organization as a subscription library supported by its patrons, who were ostensibly shareholders. Breintnall agreed to support the enterprise as its Secretary. Franklin took over as Secretary when Breintnall died. In the company's meeting minutes from 1738, Breintnall added with satisfaction that,

The Library Affair has hitherto been many ways fortunate. The books sent for to England have always come safe and without Damage; very few of the Books have been lost or carelessly defaced; a good agreement has for the most part subsisted in the Company, and all the Officers have proved faithful in their several Trusts, as far as hath yet been discovered; the Library has received Benefactions from several Gentlemen and well-wishers; and increases in its Reputation...I have presumed to make this Note without Direction, because I think it will not be disapproved of, and may prove useful. Another seven years, as successful as the foregoing must show the Library Company in a very flourishing Condition, and to be more publickly known and esteemed.

On May 5, 1746, after Breintnall's death, the directors of the Library Company, “took into Consideration, that Joseph Breintnall, late Secretary, had faithfully served the Company Yearly, without any adequate Recompence for the same, in Gratitude for which, they unanimously voted a Present of £15 to his Widow [Esther Parker] for the Use of his Family; and that his Son George shall have the free Use of Books in the Library during his Life."

=== Sheriff of Philadelphia (1735–1738) ===
In 1735 Joseph Breintnall was assigned to the position of "High Sheriff for the City and County of Philadelphia," bound under the authority of George II of Great Britain. He served as Sheriff of Philadelphia for three terms, from 1735 to 1738.

=== Nature Printing and Other Contributions to the Study of Natural History ===
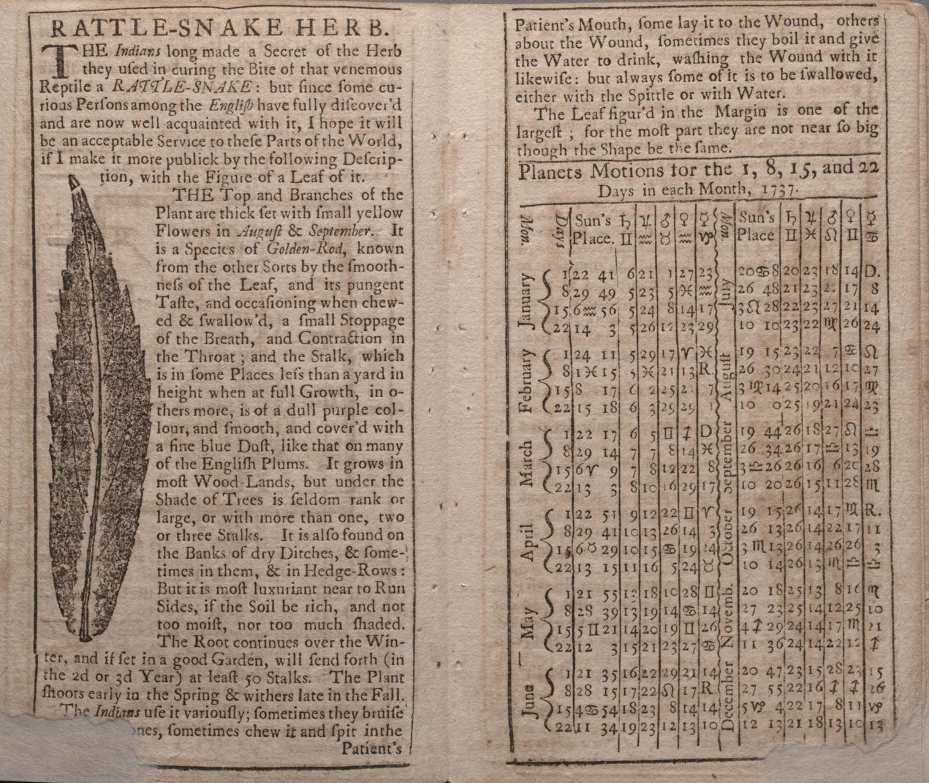
"Rattle-Snake Herb," by Joseph Breintnall. Printed in Benjamin Franklin's Poor Richard's Almanack

While some sources state that Benjamin Franklin invented Nature printing as a way of deterring counterfeiters from copying the currency he was contracted to print, it is more accurate to say that Franklin applied the results of Joseph Breintnall's early attempts to render, in scientific detail, the diversity of American botanical life. Breintnall worked with the botanist John Bartram in the early 1730s to collect samples of plants in and around the city of Philadelphia. Rather than flattening and drying leaves in order to preserve individual specimens, Breintnall experimented with making prints of fresh leaves by inking the specimens and placing them between sheets of folded paper before running through a press. While the idea of making inked impressions of leaves was a popular "craft" activity of middle-class women at the time, Breintnall is credited with applying the practice in a scientific setting. Breintnall then shipped these highly detailed prints to English naturalists like Peter Collinson. Later, Franklin and Breintnall worked to take plaster casts of various plant leaves in order to produce lead printing blocks of the specimens. Franklin returned to the technique in 1737 in an effort to thwart counterfeiters of paper money bills. These early Nature prints were sent to English naturalists who were increasingly curious about American plant biology. Together they sent nature prints which were printed directly from inked leaves to English naturalists. In the year of Breintnall's death, his wife, Esther Parker, donated two volumes of leaf prints compiled by her husband to the Library Company.

In 1737 Breintnall wrote an article about "Rattlesnake Herb"' for Franklin's Poor Richard's Almanack Franklin sold around 10,000 copies of this Almanack. Printed near the article is an image of a leaf. The image differs from the earlier prints and was made by a metal casting, rather than an inked specimen. According to the text, the image is of a kind of goldenrod.

Breintnall worked with Franklin to verify the results of an experiment designed to ascertain the relationship between color and energy absorption from the sun.

=== Writing ===
Between 1728 and 1729, Breintnall collaborated with Benjamin Franklin on a series of periodical essays written under the pseudonym "The Busy-Body." The 32 article series, most of which were written by Breintnall, were printed in The American Weekly Mercury, an early American newspaper founded and published by Andrew Bradford.

Breintnall was also an amateur poet. His most notable work is his "Tribute To John Bartram" (~1743). In 1825, James Madison, who mistakenly thought that the poem was written by Benjamin Franklin, wrote that the "Tribute To John Bartram," "merits preservation, as well on account of its author, as of its moral improvement on the original ode."
