= Samuel Keimer =

English printer and American immigrant

- Born: Samuel Keimer; 1689; London Borough of Southwark, England
- Died: 1742 (aged 52–53)
- Occupation: Printer
- Employer: Print shop owner
- Known for: Printing businesses

Samuel Keimer (1689–1742) was originally an English printer and then an emigrant to the United States who became an early American printer. He was the founder of The Pennsylvania Gazette. On October 2, 1729, Benjamin Franklin bought this weekly newspaper.

== Early life ==
Keimer was born in 1689 in the London Borough of Southwark, England. Like his sister Mary, he was for a time a follower of the Camisards, a religious group.

Keimer learned the trade of printing from a well-known London printer. He opened a printing business in 1713, but it ultimately failed, and he was thrown into prison for not paying his debts and for printing seditious and Jacobite material. When he got out of prison he went to America, leaving his English wife behind. He settled in Philadelphia.

== In Pennsylvania ==
In 1712, Andrew Bradford had been the first person to start a printing business in Philadelphia. In 1723, Keimer opened a printing business near the Market-house in the city. He and Bradford were then the only printers in the colony of Pennsylvania.

When Benjamin Franklin, aged 17, came to Philadelphia looking for a job in 1723, he went first to Bradford's printing business. Bradford had no job openings but introduced him to Keimer. Franklin found Keimer trying to set up a composition of his own, an elegy for the recently deceased poet Aquila Rose, but having difficulty. Keimer hired Franklin as his assistant, giving him his first paid job.

From December 1728 to September 1729, Keimer published a weekly newspaper, which he entitled The Universal Instructor in All Arts and Sciences: And Pennsylvania Gazette, a title Franklin would simplify to the Pennsylvania Gazette. Along with the standard fare for an early American newspaper (news, announcements, and advertisements), Keimer included lengthy extracts from Ephraim Chambers' Cyclopaedia (1728) in nearly every issue. This was the first attempt to publish a general encyclopedia in the Americas, though it remained incomplete. Unfortunately for Keimer, by 1729 his business had dwindled, and he had fallen into debt. In 1729, he left for Barbados after selling his print shop and newspaper to Franklin. Franklin chose to discontinue the extracts from the Cyclopaedia, which Keimer had carried on midway through the letter "A."

== Later life ==
In 1731, at Bridgetown, Barbados, Keimer began publishing the Barbadoes Gazette. It was the first newspaper in the Caribbean. In 1733 he was sued for a malicious statement in his paper. He continued to publish the newspaper until its operation ceased in 1738.

== Works ==
While in prison in London, Keimer wrote A Search after Religion among the many Modern Pretenders to it (1718) and A Brand Pluck'd from the Burning exemplify'd in the unparallel'd case of Samuel Keimer (1718). A Brand Pluck'd from the Burning highlighted disagreements and disputes among the Camisards, from whom Keimer had become estranged. It also spoke of prison life and included a letter from the English trader Daniel Defoe.

== Death ==
Keimer died in 1742 aged 52–53.

== Bibliography ==
- Anderson, Douglas (2 April 2009). A House Undivided: Domesticity and Community in American Literature. Cambridge University Press. ISBN 978-0-521-10730-3.
- Franklin, Benjamin (1874). Bigelow, John (ed.). Life of Benjamin Franklin written by himself.
- Isaacson, Walter (4 May 2004). Benjamin Franklin: An American Life. Simon & Schuster. ISBN 978-0-7432-5807-4.
- Loveland, Jeff (4 May 2025). "Samuel Keimer's Cyclopaedia (1728–29): The First (Incomplete) General Encyclopedia Launched in the Americas". American Periodicals: A Journal of History & Criticism. 35: 22–45. doi:10.1353/amp.2025.a962102.
- Tedder, Henry Richard (1892). Keimer, Samuel. Vol. 30.
- Thomas, Isaiah (1874). The History of Printing in America: With a Biography of Printers, and an Account of Newspapers. To which is Prefixed a Concise View of the Discovery and Progress of the Art in Other Parts of the World. Isaiah Thomas, jun. Isaac Sturtevant, Printer.
