= The Pennsylvania Gazette =

Newspaper printed from 1728 until 1815 in the United States

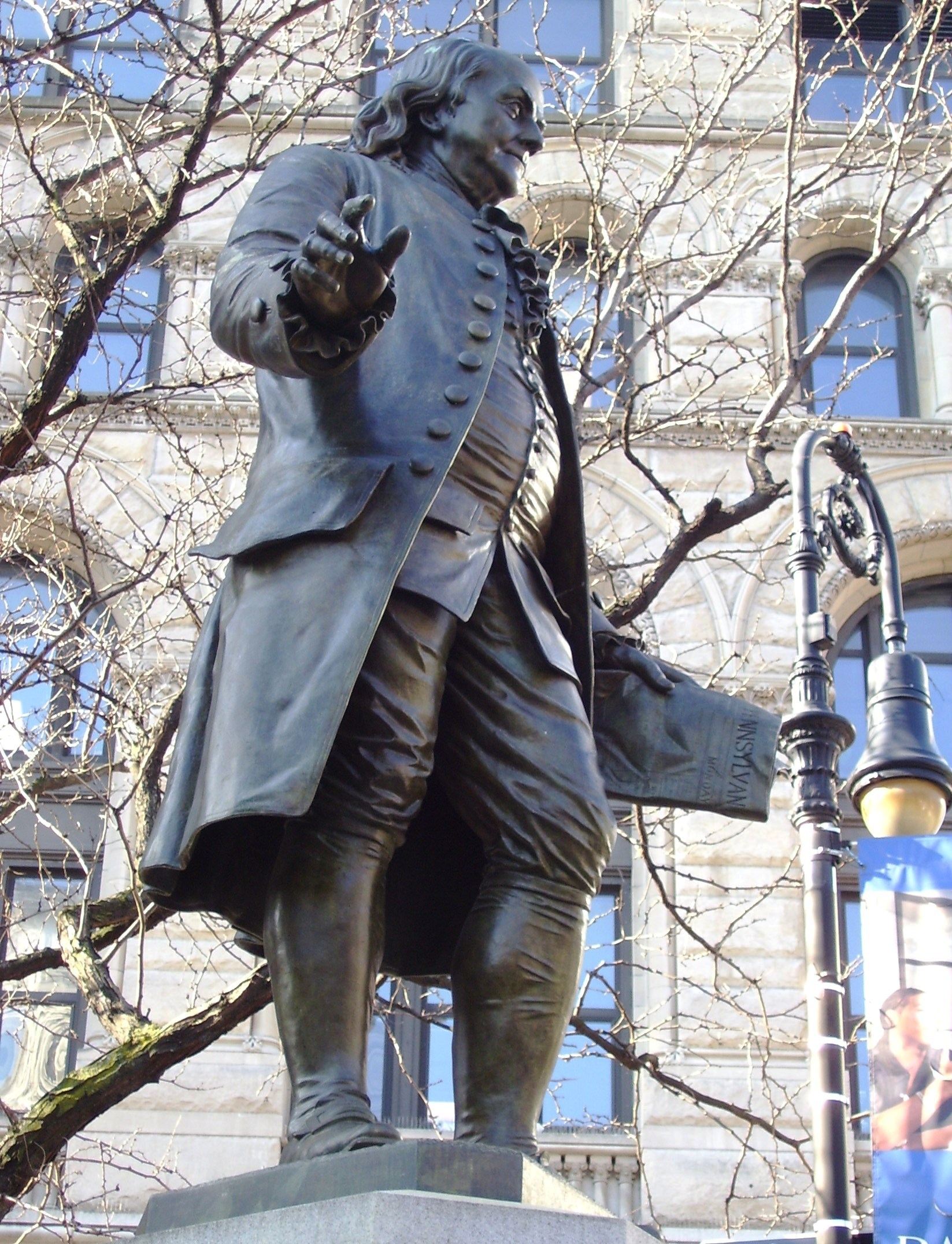
- A New York City statue of Benjamin Franklin holding a copy of The Pennsylvania Gazette
- Founder(s): Samuel Keimer; Benjamin Franklin in 1729, who bought and reoriented the publication into a 'news only' newspaper
- Founded: 1728; 298 years ago (as The Universal Instructor in all Arts and Sciences: and Pennsylvania Gazette)
- Ceased publication: 1815; 211 years ago
- Political alignment: Non partisan
- Headquarters: Philadelphia, Pennsylvania, U.S.

The Pennsylvania Gazette was one of the United States' most prominent newspapers from 1728 until 1815. In the years leading up to the American Revolution, the newspaper served as a voice for colonial opposition to British colonial rule, especially to the Stamp Act and the Townshend Acts. The newspaper was headquartered in Philadelphia.

== History ==
=== 18th century ===
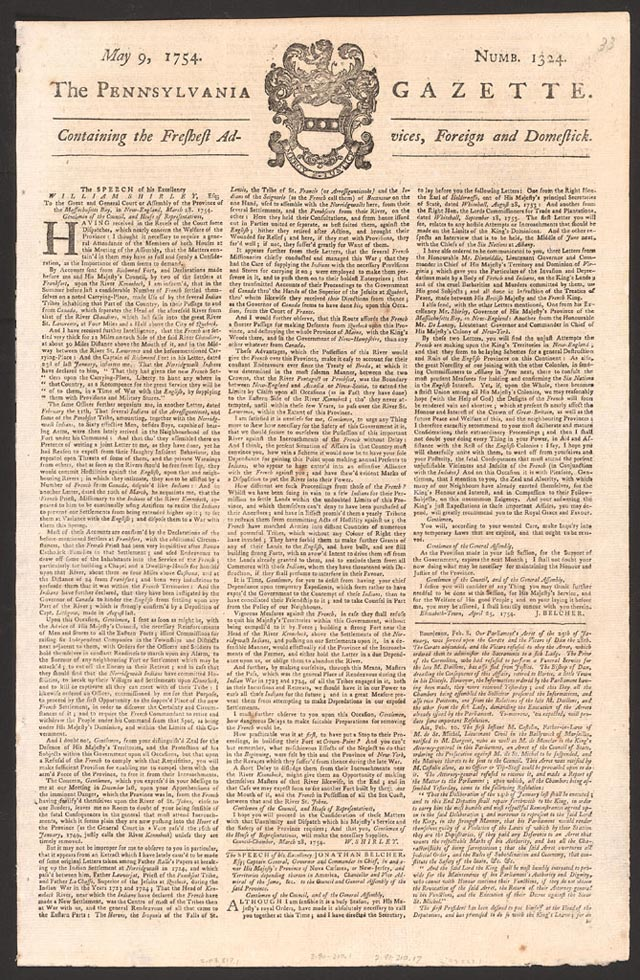
The May 9, 1754 edition of The Pennsylvania Gazette

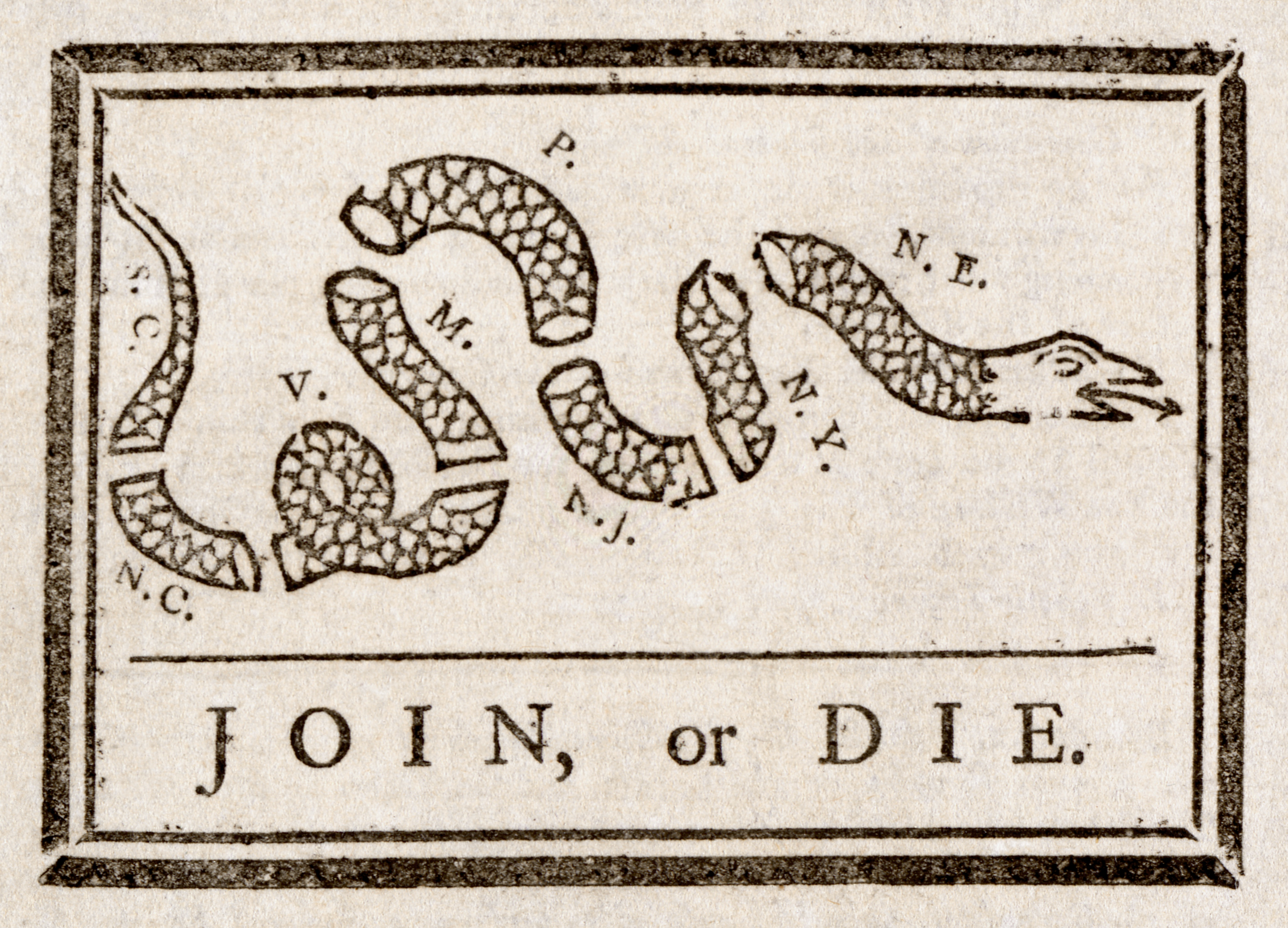
Join, or Die political cartoon attributed to Benjamin Franklin, advocating in support of the American colonies joining the Albany Plan for Union, May 9, 1754

The newspaper was first published in 1728 by Samuel Keimer and was the second newspaper to be published in the colonial Province of Pennsylvania under the name The Universal Instructor in all Arts and Sciences: and Pennsylvania Gazette, a reference to Keimer's intention to print out a page of Ephraim Chambers' Cyclopaedia, or Universal Dictionary of Arts and Sciences in each edition.

On October 2, 1729, Samuel Keimer, the owner of The Gazette, fell into debt and before fleeing to Barbados sold the newspaper to Benjamin Franklin and his partner Hugh Meredith, who shortened its name, as well as dropping Keimer's grandiose plan to print out the Cyclopaedia. Franklin not only printed the paper but also often contributed pieces to the paper under aliases. His newspaper soon became the most successful in the colonies.

On December 28, 1732, Franklin announced in The Gazette that he had just printed and published the first edition of The Poor Richard, also known as Poor Richard's Almanack, by Richard Saunders, Philomath.

On August 6, 1741, Franklin published an editorial following the death of Andrew Hamilton, a lawyer and public figure in Philadelphia and friend of Franklin. The editorial praised the man highly and showed Franklin had held the man in high esteem.

On October 19, 1752, Franklin published a third-person account of his pioneering kite experiment in The Pennsylvania Gazette, without mentioning that he himself had performed it.

In 1779, the name of the paper was changed to The Pennsylvania Gazette and Weekly Advertiser, before reverting to The Pennsylvania Gazette in 1782.

While the purpose of the publication was primarily for classified ads, merchants and individuals listed notices of employment, lost and found goods and items for sale, it also reprinted foreign news. Most entries involved stories of travel. The gazette also published advertisements for runaway slaves and indentured servants.

Among other firsts by The Pennsylvania Gazette, the newspaper was the first to publish the political cartoon Join, or Die, authored by Franklin. The cartoon resurfaced later in the 18th century as a symbol in support of the American Revolution.

=== 19th century ===
The paper ceased publication in 1815, twenty-five years after Franklin's death. It is claimed that the publication later reemerged as the Saturday Evening Post in 1821.

There are three known copies of the original issue, which are held by the Historical Society of Pennsylvania and the Library Company of Philadelphia, both in Philadelphia, and the Wisconsin State Historical Society at the University of Wisconsin-Madison in Madison, Wisconsin.

== Other uses ==
The Pennsylvania Gazette moniker is used by an unrelated bi-monthly alumni magazine of the University of Pennsylvania, an Ivy League university that Franklin founded and served at as one of its first trustees.

== See also ==
- Early American publishers and printers
- Join, or Die
- Liberty's Kids
- Pennsylvania Chronicle
- The Constitutional Post
- The Drinker's Dictionary

== Sources ==
- Aldridge, Alfred Owen (February 15, 1962). "Benjamin Franklin and the "Pennsylvania Gazette"". Proceedings of the American Philosophical Society. 106 (1). American Philosophical Society: 77–81. JSTOR 985213.
- Clark, Charles E.; Wetherell, Charles (April 1989). "The Measure of Maturity: The Pennsylvania Gazette, 1728-1765". The William and Mary Quarterly. 46 (2). Omohundro Institute of Early American History and Culture: 279–303. doi:10.2307/1920255. JSTOR 1920255.
- Bernard Bailyn; John B. Hench, eds. (1981) [1980]. The Press & the American Revolution. Boston : Northeastern University Press (Originally published: Worcester, Mass. : American Antiquarian Society). ISBN 978-0-9303-50307.
- Miller, C. William (1961). "Franklin's "Poor Richard Almanacs": Their Printing and Publication". Studies in Bibliography. 14. Bibliographical Society of the University of Virginia: 97–115. JSTOR 40371300.
