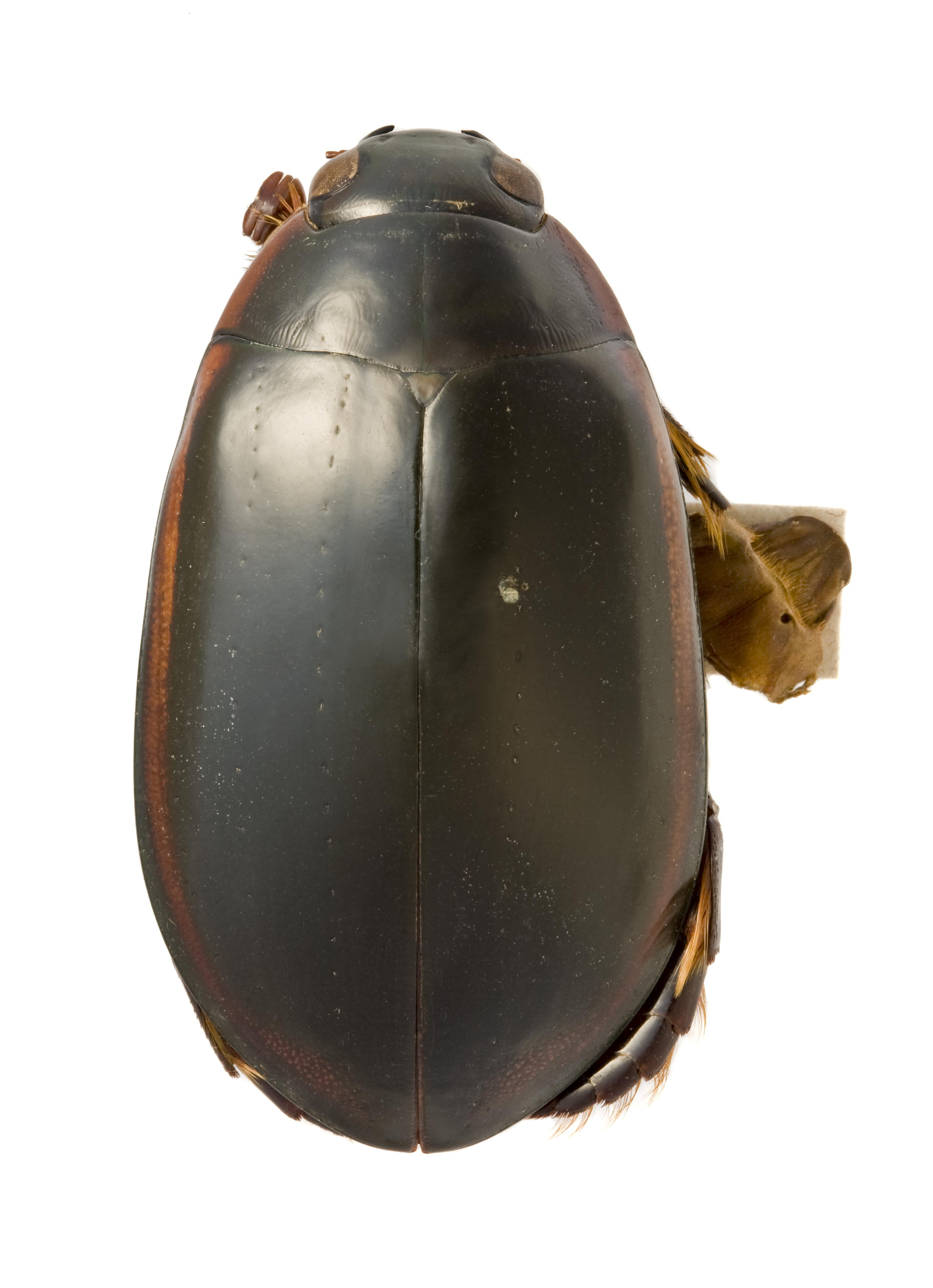
- Holotype of Bifurcitus ducalis, housed in the Natural History Museum, London

Conservation status
- Extinct (IUCN 2.3)

Scientific classification
- Kingdom: Animalia
- Phylum: Arthropoda
- Clade: Pancrustacea
- Class: Insecta
- Order: Coleoptera
- Suborder: Adephaga
- Family: Dytiscidae
- Genus: Bifurcitus
- Species: †B. ducalis

Binomial name
- †Bifurcitus ducalis (Sharp, 1882)

Synonyms
- Megadytes ducalis Sharp, 1882

= Bifurcitus ducalis =

Species of beetle

Bifurcitus ducalis, formerly Megadytes ducalis, is a species of water beetle in the family Dytiscidae. It is the largest species in the family. Until recently, the species was only known from a single specimen that was collected in the 19th century from Brazil, but more specimens, also collected in the 19th century from Brazil, were discovered in 2019. Although listed as extinct by the IUCN, the limited studies conducted on water beetles in Brazil means that it might still survive.

== History ==
The first specimen of B. ducalis was collected in the 19th century from an unknown locality in Brazil and is kept at the Natural History Museum, London. Rumors indicated it was found in the bottom of a canoe in the Amazon.

In 2019, a study reported 10 additional specimens (including the first female of the species), all collected in the late 19th century, discovered incidentally in the National Museum of Natural History of France. While the original holotype lacked any exact location data, the new specimens all indicate that they were collected in Santo Antonio da Barra (now known as Condeuba) in the southern part of Bahia, Brazil. Villagers in the region were involved in insect trade, capturing the much sought after specimens of Hypocephalus armatus found around the region.

As a consequence of the lack of recent records, the IUCN lists it as extinct. Considering the absence of information about the species and the limited studies conducted on water beetles in Brazil, it might still survive.

== Morphology ==
Bifurcitus ducalis is a large and robust beetle with total length ranging from 42.9 to 47.4 mm (1.69–1.87 in). It is distinctly larger than congeners such as B. lherminieri and B. magnus, and not as broadly oval in shape as them. The two sexes of B. ducalis are externally similar, except for females being shiny without any signs of striae on the dorsal surface, and lacking protarsal disks and yellow setae on ventral surface of mesotarsomere I.

== Distribution ==
This species appears to have a restricted distribution in the cerrado, with the only known specimens being from Condeuba in Bahia, eastern Brazil. If it still survives, it is likely to be seriously threatened from habitat loss.
