= Bifurcitus magnus =

Scientific classification
- Domain: Eukaryota
- Kingdom: Animalia
- Phylum: Arthropoda
- Class: Insecta
- Order: Coleoptera
- Suborder: Adephaga
- Family: Dytiscidae
- Genus: Bifurcitus
- Species: B. magnus

Binomial name
- Bifurcitus magnus (Trémouilles and Bachmann, 1980)

Synonyms
- Megadytes magnus (Trémouilles and Bachmann, 1980)

Genus of beetles

Bifurcitus magnus is a species of beetles in the dytiscid subfamily Cybistrinae that occurs in South America.
