= Trifurcitus =

Scientific classification
- Domain: Eukaryota
- Kingdom: Animalia
- Phylum: Arthropoda
- Class: Insecta
- Order: Coleoptera
- Suborder: Adephaga
- Family: Dytiscidae
- Tribe: Cybistrini
- Genus: Trifurcitus; Brinck, 1945

Genus of beetles

Trifurcitus is a genus of beetles in the dytiscid subfamily Cybistrinae that occur in the Neotropics. The genus contains six species that were previously classified in the genus Megadytes.

- Trifurcitus aubei (Wilke, 1920)
- Trifurcitus aubei meridionalis (Mouchamps, 1957)
- Trifurcitus fallax (Aubé, 1838)
- Trifurcitus gravidus (Sharp, 1882)
- Trifurcitus obesus (Sharp, 1882)
- Trifurcitus perplexus (Sharp, 1882)
- Trifurcitus robustus (Aubé, 1838)
