= M. giganteus =

M. giganteus may refer to:

- Machairodus giganteus, a large saber-toothed cat species found in Europe, Asia, Africa and North America during the Miocene and Pleistocene
- Macronectes giganteus, the southern giant petrel, a large seabird species of the southern oceans
- Macropus giganteus, the eastern grey kangaroo, a marsupial species found in Australia
- Mastigoproctus giganteus, the giant vinegarroon, a whip scorpion species found in the southern United States
- Mastodonsaurus giganteus, an extinct amphibian species from the Triassic
- Megadytes giganteus, a large diving beetle species found in the Caribbean and in South America
- Megaloceros giganteus, the Irish elk or giant deer, an extinct mammal species found across Eurasia during the Late Pleistocene
- Menodus giganteus, an extinct brontothere species
- Meripilus giganteus, a mushroom species
- Miscanthus giganteus, a large perennial grass hybrid of Miscanthus sinensis and Miscanthus sacchariflorus native to Japan
- Mosasaurus giganteus, an extinct carnivorous aquatic lizard species that lived during the Cretaceous
