= Paramegadytes =

Scientific classification
- Domain: Eukaryota
- Kingdom: Animalia
- Phylum: Arthropoda
- Class: Insecta
- Order: Coleoptera
- Suborder: Adephaga
- Family: Dytiscidae
- Tribe: Cybistrini
- Genus: Paramegadytes; Trémouilles and Bachmann, 1980

Genus of beetles

Paramegadytes is a genus of beetles in the dytiscid subfamily Cybistrinae that occur in the Neotropics. The genus contains two species that were previously classified in the genus Megadytes.

- Paramegadytes australis (Germain, 1854)
- Paramegadytes glaucus (Brullé, 1837)
