= Bifurcitus =

Scientific classification
- Domain: Eukaryota
- Kingdom: Animalia
- Phylum: Arthropoda
- Class: Insecta
- Order: Coleoptera
- Suborder: Adephaga
- Family: Dytiscidae
- Tribe: Cybistrini
- Genus: Bifurcitus; Brinck, 1945

Genus of beetles

Bifurcitus is a genus of beetles in the dytiscid subfamily Cybistrinae that occur in the Neotropics. The genus contains three species, two extant and one presumed extinct; they were previously classified in the genus Megadytes.

- †Bifurcitus ducalis (Sharp, 1882)
- Bifurcitus lherminieri (Guérin-Méneville, 1829)
- Bifurcitus magnus (Trémouilles & Bachmann, 1980)
