= Megadytes fraternus =

Scientific classification
- Kingdom: Animalia
- Phylum: Arthropoda
- Class: Insecta
- Order: Coleoptera
- Suborder: Adephaga
- Family: Dytiscidae
- Genus: Megadytes
- Species: M. fraternus

Binomial name
- Megadytes fraternus Sharp, 1882

Species of beetle

Megadytes fraternus is a species of predaceous diving beetle in the family Dytiscidae. It is found in North America and the Neotropics.
