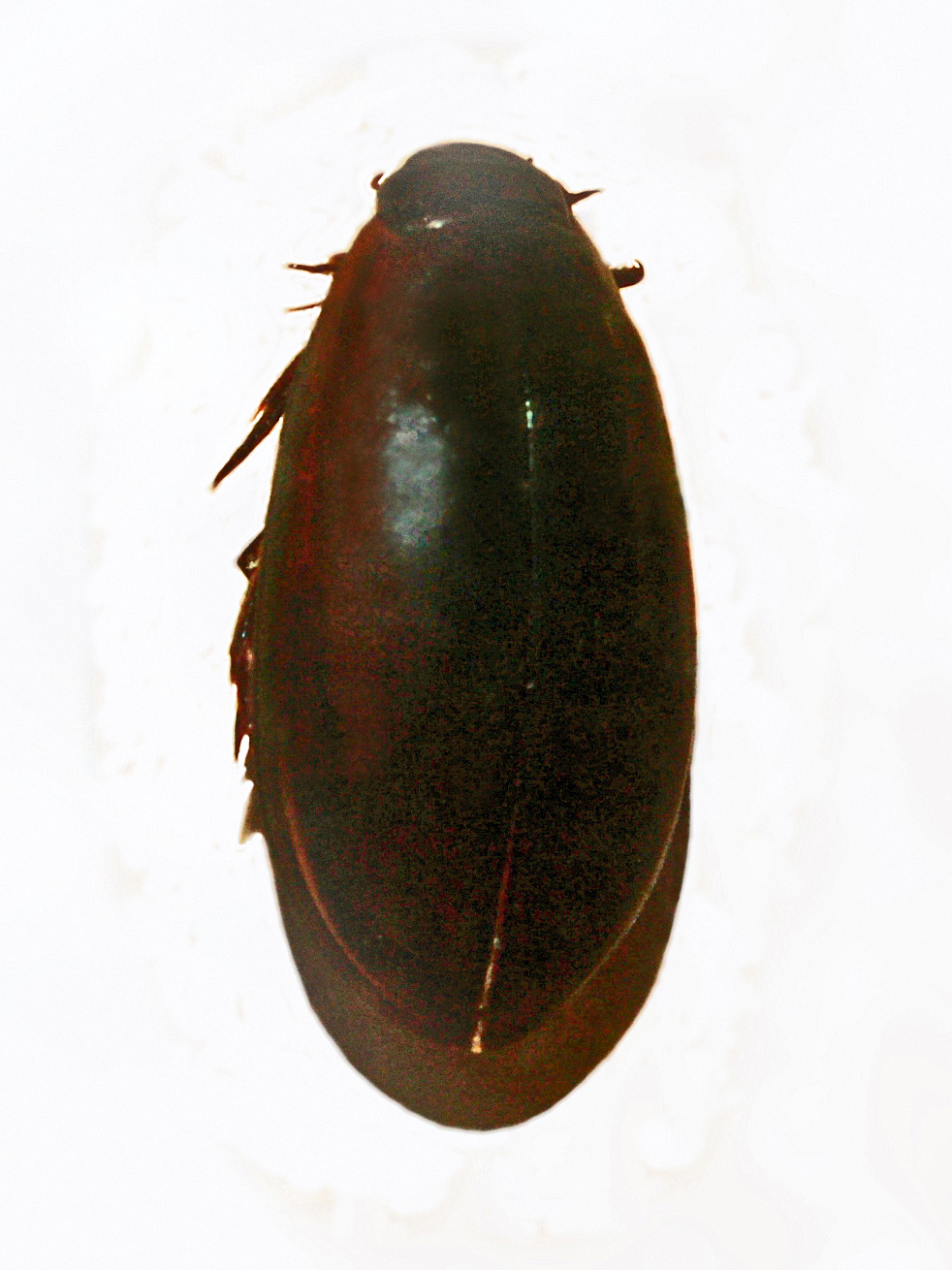
- Megadytes glaucus from Argentina

Scientific classification
- Kingdom: Animalia
- Phylum: Arthropoda
- Clade: Pancrustacea
- Class: Insecta
- Order: Coleoptera
- Suborder: Adephaga
- Family: Dytiscidae
- Genus: Megadytes
- Species: M. glaucus

Binomial name
- Megadytes glaucus (Brullé, 1837)

Synonyms
- Dyticus glaucus Brullé, 1837; Cybister aeneus Ormancey, 1843; Cybister biungulatus Babington, 1841; Trochalus brasiliensis Dejean, 1833

= Megadytes glaucus =

Species of beetle

Megadytes glaucus is a species of beetles of the family Dytiscidae.

== Description ==
Megadytes glaucus can reach a length of about 30 millimetres (1.2 in). The basic color of the body is dark shiny. These beetles have oval, flattened streamlined bodies adapted for aquatic life. As they live in water, they have to surface for air and carry a bubble of air under their elytra. The hindlegs are adapted for propelling this insect in the water.

== Distribution ==
This species can be found in Argentina, Uruguay and Chile.
