= Cybister yulensis =

Scientific classification
- Kingdom: Animalia
- Phylum: Arthropoda
- Class: Insecta
- Order: Coleoptera
- Suborder: Adephaga
- Family: Dytiscidae
- Genus: Cybister
- Species: C. yulensis

Binomial name
- Cybister yulensis Guignot, 1956

Synonyms
- Cybister (Meganectes) yulensis Guignot, 1956

Species of beetle

Cybister yulensis is a species of predaceous diving beetle in the family Dytiscidae that occurs in Australia and New Guinea. The species is named for Yule Island, a Papua New Guinean island where it is often found.

In appearance, it is similar to C. hypomelas. C. yulensis has an elliptical shape, widest just behind the center and thinnest anteriorly. Its body has punctures and reticulation in various areas. Its overall color is dark olive green dorsally and black ventrally. The submarginal lining of the pronotum and elytra is yellow, meanwhile. This band stops near the elytra's posterior apex instead of continuing all the way, however is slightly thicker and more distinct in C. yulensis.

Another way to identify C. yulensis is to look for the greenish pit in the pronotal process, on the thorax's sternum. In addition, there is a prosternal apophysis. It is almost flat but widens at its foveolate base.

The shape of the male's penis expands a little surrounding a slight constriction in the middle of it, and the parameres do not extend in length as much as the main aedeagal structure. Females can be identified by longitudinal clefts or scratches in the pronotum and elytral base.

== Taxonomy ==
The holotype resides in the Hungarian Natural History Museum in Budapest. It was collected from Yule Island. Its sex is unspecified. What led Félix Guignot to name and describe the species in 1956 was the same museum's providing him with an earlier Cybister yulensis specimen. It came within a boxed assortment of Dytiscidae from around the world.

== Distribution and habitat ==
Cybister yulensis occurs in Australia and New Guinea. The Australian states where it occurs include the Northern Territory and the north of Queensland and Western Australia. Its distribution in Queensland ranges from Cape York to Cairns. In New Guinea, it is found in the southeast, especially Yule Island, the species’ namesake, in Papua New Guinea. Its habitat is lentic, often coastal environments.

== Description ==
=== Form ===
The adults are elliptic in shape, like many other Cybister species. The species’ shape is widest in the space right behind the center. There, both elytra are slightly flanged. Conversely, the shape thins the most in the front.

The dorsal surface is foveolate, with densely-packed minute punctures. This punctures occur most prominently on the head. On both the head and pronotum are another group of punctures that are larger and more spaced-out. The elytra are not completely smooth either, having a series of large, elongate, shallow, and moderately distinct punctures along with very fine reticulation. The spaces, or meshes, between the lining of this reticulation are minute. The grooves mark the whole elytra bar the margins.

On the ventral side, the prosternal apophysis on the prothorax is almost flat. Along with that, it widens at the base. The base is foveolate and has a clear and almost straight anterior edge. The prothoracic process is flat, weakly margined, and moderately broad. Its apex is sharply pointed, often widely and shallowly grooved anteriorly with the grooves open anteriorly. The anal sternite is edged.

Reduced punctures and very weak reticulation, also with minute meshes, appear on the metacoxal plate of the hind legs. The lines of the metacoxa are short and widely separated from each other. Anteriorly, they moderately diverge. The metacoxal lobe is weakly tuberculate, and is weakly grooved posteriorly. The metatrochanter is roundly pointed posteriorly.

=== Color ===
The dorsal side in adults is colored dark olive green. On this side, the yellow band lining the margins of the pronotum and elytra stops near the elytra's attenuated apex. Cybister yulensis has a slightly thicker and more distinct band than Cybister hypomelas, a nearby beetle. The band does not touch the edge of the elytra as it lines it except near the base. The base is the part of the elytra bordering the pronotum.

The ventral surface is black, apart from the dark reddish abdomen and narrow pronotal process in the center. The process has an often greenish pit in its front portion. This pit is one of the main features that differentiates it from the sympatric Cybister tripunctatus. In addition, the mesepimerons, metasternal wings minus the posterior half, and metacoxa all have a ferruginous-testaceous color.

The legs are black with weak testaceous variation, except for the ferruginous-tinged profemurs, mesofemurs, and hind knees.

The head's labrum is ferruginous. The epistome, which is a sclerite near the mouth, has a ferruginous tinge. The antennae are testaceous, and their articles have very slight darkenings.

=== Size ===
Adults tend to measure 30–32 mm in length. From the dorsal side, the elytra are about double the length of the head and pronotum combined.

=== Sex ===
Like other species in Dytiscidae, male Cybister yulensis beetles have round suckers, or adhesive pads, on their protarsi designed to help them adhere to the female's body during mating. For the same purpose, flat and round dilations called palettes number to 18 on the tarsi. The 2 basal palettes are the largest, 2-3 times the size of apical ones. Also here are moderately developed fringing setae. The proclaws are strongly curved and lack a basal notch. On the prosternum, the palettes are fairly large and suboval. The mesotarsi each have an oval sucker with 12-14 subequal palettes. Cybister yulensis’s anterior palettes are larger than those of Cybister hypomelas. This middle portion of the tarsus has moderately developed fringing setae as do the protarsi. The protibiae are a little expanded. The apical edges of the protibiae can either be rounded or a little sinuate. In the aedeagus, the penis, seen dorsally, slightly constricts in form medianly. Around this constriction, two portions widen. The tube of the penis, the part which is externally visible, has a truncated apex with straight lateral angles. The parameres are broad and very narrowed at the apex in a short strap-like shape. Their surfaces are mostly clear and they do not extend in length as much as the main aedeagal structure.

In females, the pronotum and elytral base have a series of deep scratches or clefts, also known as sexual sculpturing. The scratches are finest on the pronotal disc, or center of the pronotum, and they are in the direction of the longitudinal axis. The elytra are entirely striated except on the apex.

=== Larvae ===
The attributes of Cybister yulensis larvae are currently unknown.
