= Metaxydytes =

Scientific classification
- Domain: Eukaryota
- Kingdom: Animalia
- Phylum: Arthropoda
- Class: Insecta
- Order: Coleoptera
- Suborder: Adephaga
- Family: Dytiscidae
- Tribe: Cybistrini
- Genus: Metaxydytes; Miller, Michat, and Ferreira Jr., 2024

Genus of beetles

Metaxydytes is a genus of beetles in the dytiscid subfamily Cybistrinae that occur in the Neotropics. The genus contains nine species; they were previously classified in the genus Megadytes.

- Metaxydytes carcharias (Griffini, 1895)
- Metaxydytes ecuadorius (Zimmermann, 1919)
- Metaxydytes flohri (Sharp, 1882)
- Metaxydytes fraternus (Sharp, 1882)
- Metaxydytes guayanensis (Wilke, 1920)
- Metaxydytes guignoti (Mouchamps, 1957)
- Metaxydytes laevigatus (Olivier, 1795)
- Metaxydytes marginithorax (Perty, 1830)
- Metaxydytes steinheili (Wehncke, 1876)
