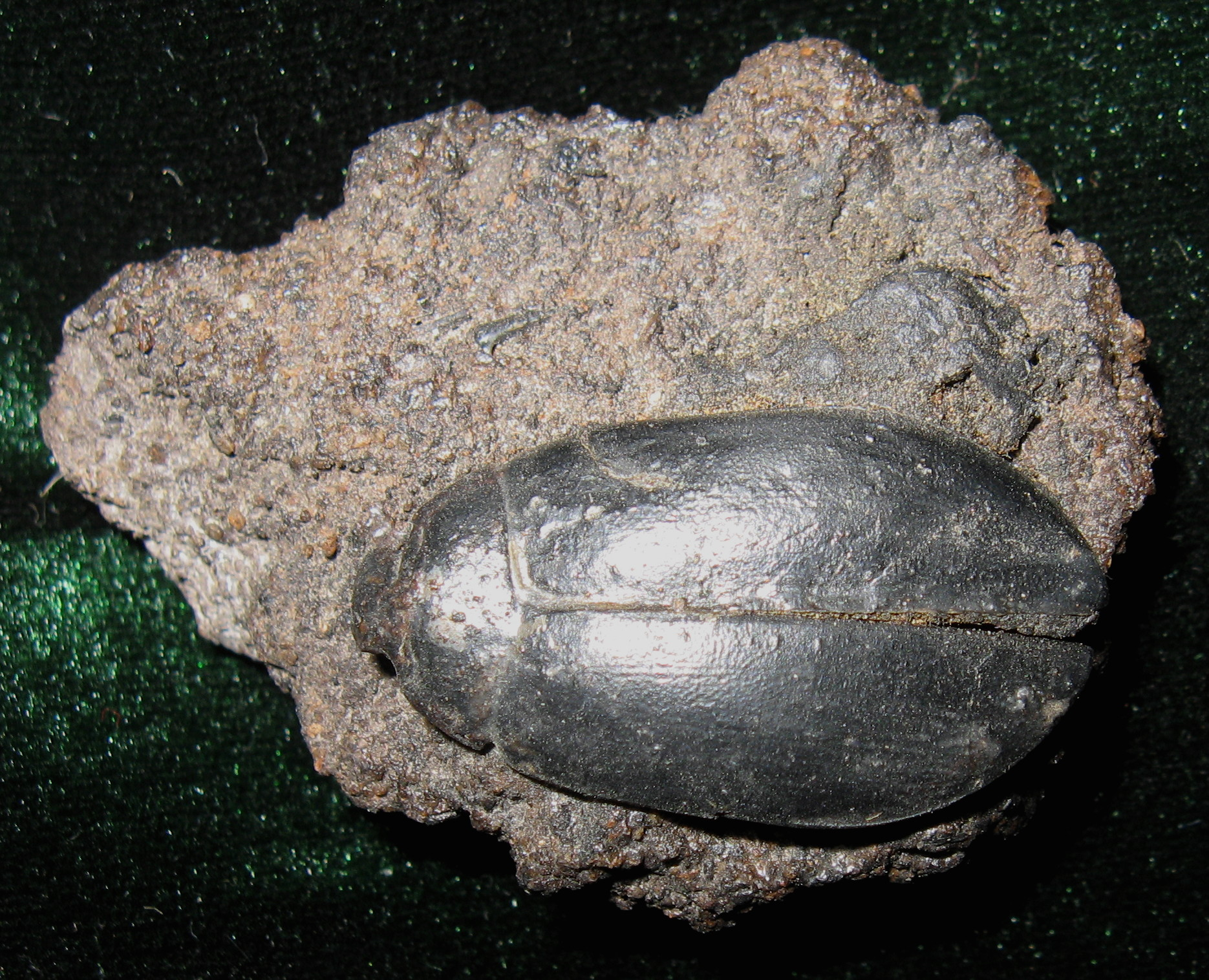

Scientific classification
- Domain: Eukaryota
- Kingdom: Animalia
- Phylum: Arthropoda
- Class: Insecta
- Order: Coleoptera
- Suborder: Adephaga
- Family: Dytiscidae
- Genus: Cybister
- Species: C. explanatus

Binomial name
- Cybister explanatus LeConte, 1852

= Cybister explanatus =

Species of beetle

Cybister explanatus, alias Cybister fusculus, is a species of beetle in the family Dytiscidae that occurs in western North America and Middle America. It is in the Nealocomerus subgenus of Cybister, which denotes a Cybister species from the Nearctic region. Being a predaceous diving beetle, it is aquatic and primarily found in lentic, or still-water, habitats, as well as valleys. It has been known to often have an important carnivorous role in these ecosystems. Distinctive physical traits of C. explanatus include the sharp points of the hind legs’ metafemora and the yellow lining of the elytra and pronotum's margins. C. explanatus is notable for being edible, serving as a taco filling in Mexico and as foodstuff.

== Use as food ==
The adults of this species are edible and are eaten roasted and as a taco filling in Mexico. Their use as food traces back to prehistoric times, as revealed by a mid-1900s excavation project of caves in Nevada. Cybister explanatus remains were in human coprolites, or fossilized dung, attributed to the Humboldt Sink. They were intact, indicating that prehistoric North Americans did not chew them before eating them. The remains also lacked heads. This suggests that they removed them prior to consumption. In modern times, this practice for eating dytiscids continues, since commercial producers give the same advice. Therefore, it is probably wisdom passed down through the ages.

== Taxonomy ==
The species name Cybister explanatus (explanatus = "widened" in Latin) comes from John Lawrence LeConte in 1852. The species Cybister fusculus (fusculus = "small and dark") described later, by Elwood Zimmerman in 1919, has been recognized to be the same as C. explanatus. So, conventions treat them as synonyms. Two subspecies of C. explanatus have been proposed: Cybister explanatus fusculus and Cybister explanatus laevicollis (laevicollis = "with neck smooth"). These have not earned full recognition, though, because the consensus was that their traits did not go beyond the usual variation of the species. In addition, Cybister explanatus is part of the subgenus Nealocomerus due to being endemic to the Nearctic region.

== Description ==
In appearance, it superficially resembles Cybister ellipticus. One identifying feature of Cybister explanatus is the stripe of yellow often surrounding both sides of the elytra's epipleura and the margins of the pronotum in front of it.

Its two rear legs are distinctively designed for facilitating swimming. These legs' metafemora each end in sharp points, or apices. C. explanatus has four or five short, coarse folds or ridges near the articulation of the legs. They are better developed in males.

Cybister explanatus has an elliptic shape. From the dorsal view, the broadest area of the adult's shape tends to be little less than 10 mm far from the posterior. From both sides then, its shape tapers gradually and then rounds. Its head is relatively broad and flat. The elytra are the largest part of the dorsal side. There is a minuscule triangular plate, the scutellum, behind the pronotum.

Like other species in Coleoptera, the tarsi of the males’ legs have modifications distinct from the females. This is to ensure a secure hold on their mates during copulation. One of such modifications is the presence of palettes. Palettes are flat, disc-like dilations of the legs. C. explanatus has palettes in four transverse series. The first consists of 14 palettes, the second 19, the third 21, and the fourth 20. That adds up to 74 palettes in total.

Another gender difference is that the females usually have sexual sculpturing. These are fields of fine scratches that have been observed on the pronotum, bases of the elytra, and on the base of the head. However, many specimens lack sculpturing on their elytra.

=== Color ===
The coloration of the dorsal side, which includes the tops of the head, pronotum, and elytra, varies from green to brown-black. The ventral coloration, of the bottom side where the belly is, varies from brown to black.

=== Size ===
The adults generally range in size from 24.5 to 29 mm, and the larvae from 13 to 15.2 mm. Therefore, C. explanatus generally grows 1.8-1.9 times its initial size over its lifespan.

=== Variation ===
Cybister explanatus is a relatively consistent species, with most variations being in size and coloration. The yellow stripe on the elytra and pronotum is variable in width and length.

== Distribution and habitat ==
Cybister explanatus is present from extreme southern Oregon through California and Nevada and in western Mexico from the north all the way down to the southernmost state of Chiapas. It lives in various habitats, but mostly lentic ones, like ponds and lakes. It also lives in valley environments.

== Behavior ==
This species is known to show attraction to lights. H. F. Wickham described the movement of Cybister explanatus as lazy compared to northern water beetles. Meanwhile, the individuals that James G. Needham found were highly active, with such a ferocious appetite as to exhibit cannibalism. C. explanatus has been known to often take a major carnivorous role within the aquatic ecosystems in which it participates.
