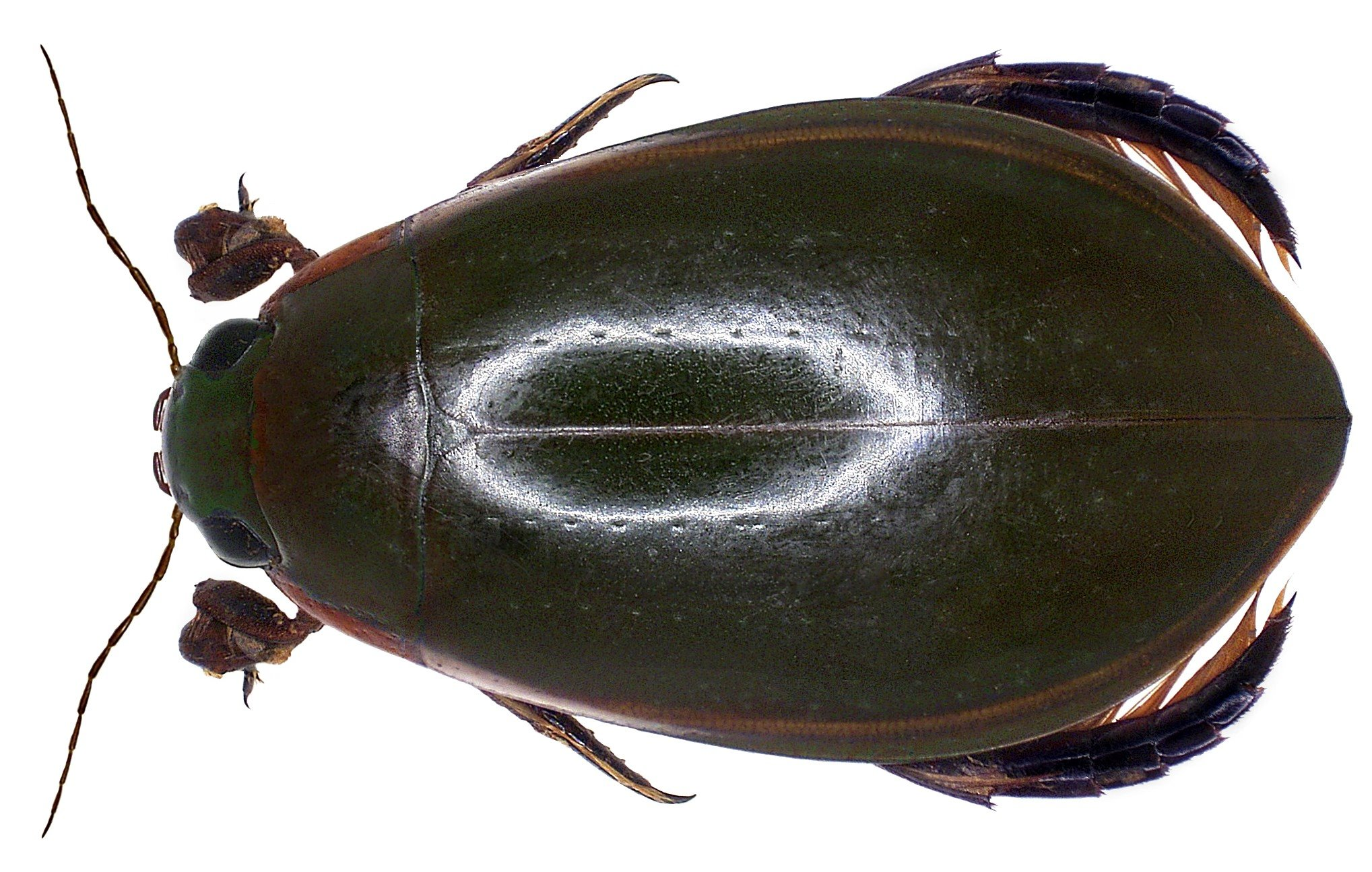
- Male

Scientific classification
- Domain: Eukaryota
- Kingdom: Animalia
- Phylum: Arthropoda
- Class: Insecta
- Order: Coleoptera
- Suborder: Adephaga
- Family: Dytiscidae
- Genus: Cybister
- Species: C. lateralimarginalis

Binomial name
- Cybister lateralimarginalis (De Geer, 1774)

= Cybister lateralimarginalis =

Species of beetle

Cybister lateralimarginalis is a species of beetle native to the Palearctic, including Europe, the Middle East and North Africa.
