= Cybister ventralis =

Scientific classification
- Kingdom: Animalia
- Phylum: Arthropoda
- Class: Insecta
- Order: Coleoptera
- Suborder: Adephaga
- Family: Dytiscidae
- Genus: Cybister
- Species: C. ventralis

Binomial name
- Cybister ventralis Sharp, 1882

Synonyms
- Cybister crassus Sharp, 1882; Cybister (Meganectes) ventralis Sharp, 1882; Cybister gracilis Sharp, 1882 (misiden.)

Species of beetle

Cybister ventralis, is a species of predaceous diving beetle found in India, Bangladesh, Myanmar, Pakistan, Sri Lanka and China.

Adult beetles are edible and consumed in fried form.
