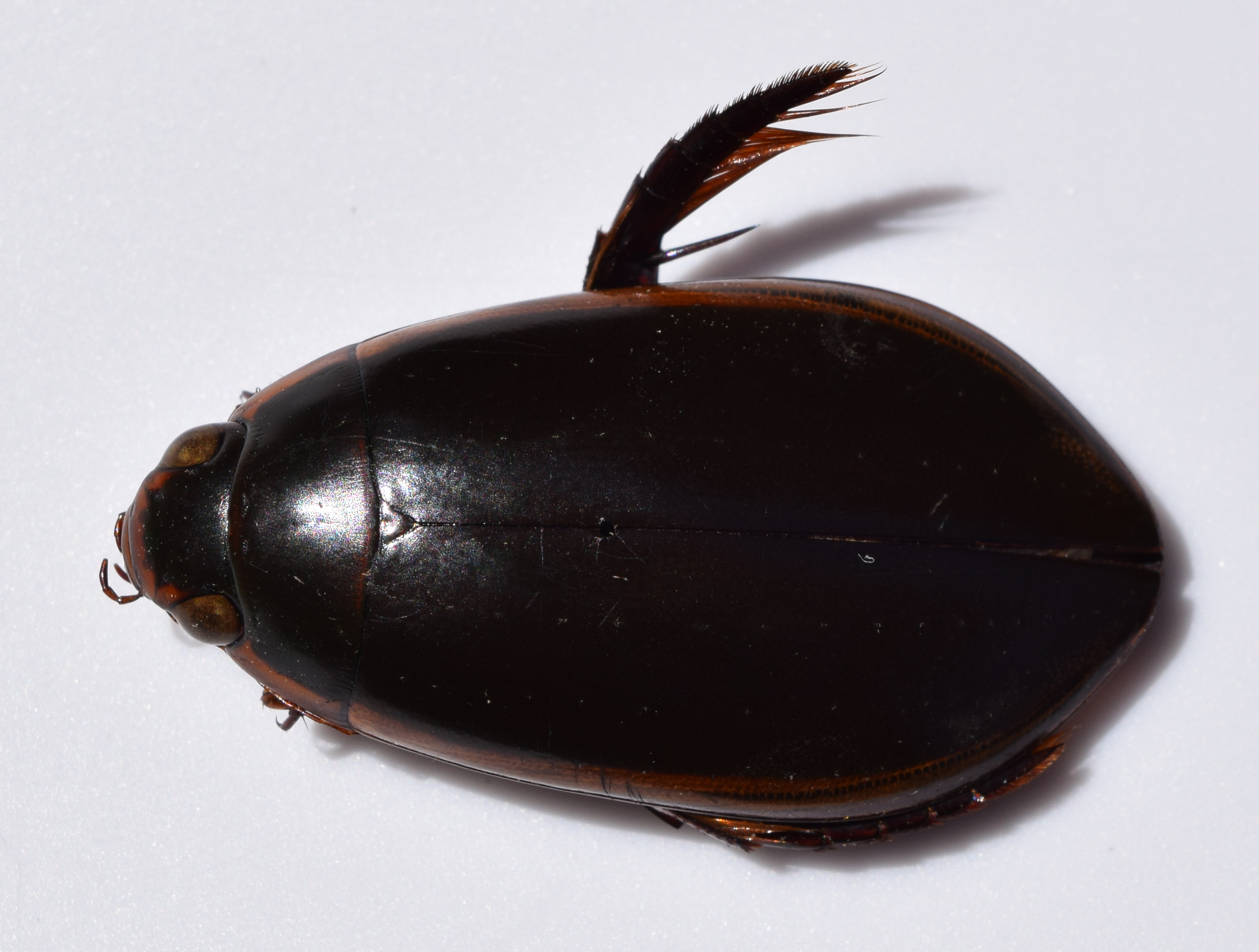
- Cybister fimbriolatus

Scientific classification
- Domain: Eukaryota
- Kingdom: Animalia
- Phylum: Arthropoda
- Class: Insecta
- Order: Coleoptera
- Suborder: Adephaga
- Family: Dytiscidae
- Subfamily: Cybistrinae
- Tribe: Cybistrini
- Genus: Cybister; Curtis, 1827

= Cybister =

Genus of beetles

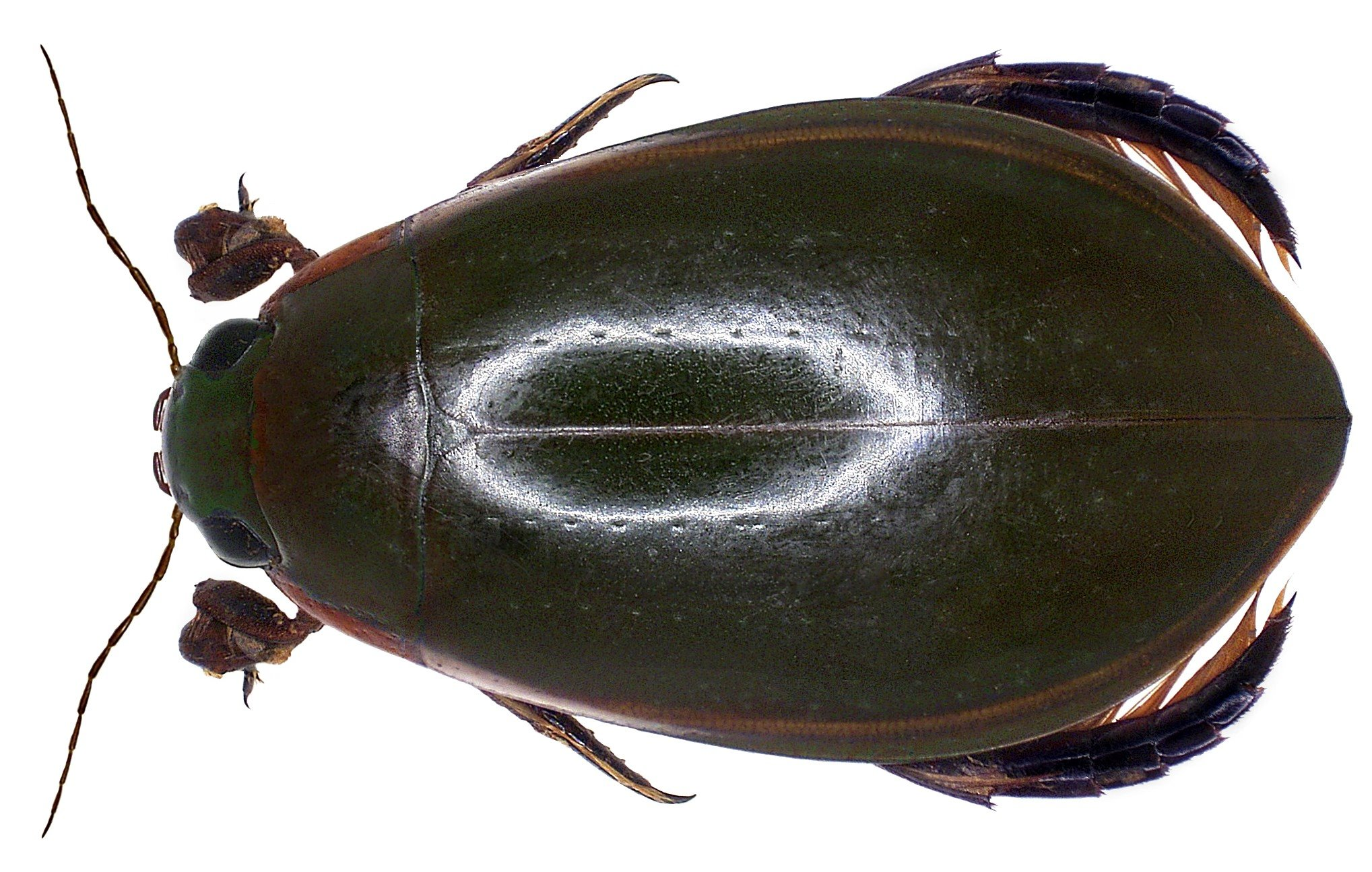
Cybister lateralimarginalis

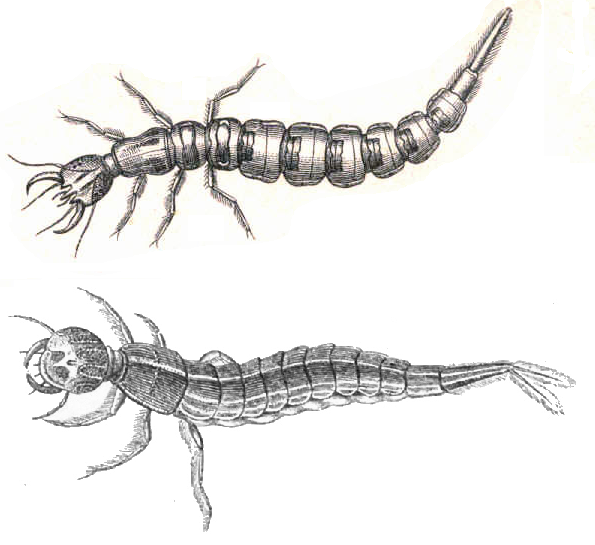
Comparison of Cybister and Dytiscus larvae

Cybister ('kybistētēr' = diver, tumbler), is a genus of beetle in family Dytiscidae. They are found in much of the world, including all continents except Antarctica. As of 2024 there are 98 species and 9 additional subspecies among four subgenera in the genus.

== Description ==
Adult Cybister have broad hind legs with unequal tarsal claws (the inner claw being smaller and sometimes absent) and a fringe on the outer margin of the tarsus. They range in length up to 43 mm (C. bimaculatus from the Afrotropics). Adult males of the North American species have several ridges on the coxae of the hind legs, forming a stridulatory device.

Larvae have a frontal tooth on the head and lack cerci. North American species can grow up to 80 mm long.

== Ecology ==
Cybister live in lentic (still fresh water) habitats that have vegetation.

Like other diving beetles, Cybister are predatory. Larvae of C. japonicus prey on insects (mainly Odonata nymphs and the backswimmer Notonecta triguttata) in their first two instars, while third-instar larvae prey on vertebrates (tadpoles and fish). Larvae of C. rugosus feed on both invertebrates and vertebrates in all instars.

== Importance ==
Cybister chinensis (sometimes misidentified as C. japonicus) is used in a game in Korea. The water beetle game (mul bang gae nori) is played in an oval, water-filled tank with vertical flanges along its inner edge and prizes on the tank rim. The game is played by dropping a C. chinensis through a funnel into the center of the tank, after which it swims towards the edge of the tank and stops in one of the slots formed by the metal flanges. If a prize is above this slot, the player wins it.

The swimming behaviour of C. lateralimarginalis has inspired (biomimetics) the design of a legged underwater robot.

== List of species ==
=== Subgenus Cybister Curtis, 1827 ===
- Cybister alluaudi Guignot, 1936
- Cybister bengalensis Aubé, 1838
- Cybister buqueti Aubé, 1838
- Cybister cardoni Severin, 1890
- Cybister celebensis Sharp, 1882
- Cybister cephalotes Sharp, 1882
- Cybister chinensis Motschulsky, 1854
- Cybister cinctus Sharp, 1882
- Cybister cognatus Sharp, 1882
- Cybister concessor Guignot, 1947
- Cybister confusus Sharp, 1882
- Cybister crassipes Sharp, 1882
- Cybister crassiusculus Régimbart, 1895
- Cybister dejeanii Aubé, 1838
- Cybister dytiscoides Sharp, 1882
- Cybister ellipticus LeConte, 1852
- Cybister explanatus LeConte, 1852
- Cybister extenuans (Walker, 1858)
- Cybister favareli Guignot, 1936
- Cybister fimbriolatus (Say, 1823)
- Cybister fumatus Sharp, 1882
- Cybister godeffroyi (Wehncke, 1876)
- Cybister gracilis Sharp, 1882
- Cybister gschwendtneri Guignot, 1935
- Cybister guerini Aubé, 1838
- Cybister guignoti Gschwendtner, 1936
  - Cybister guignoti pseudosenegalensis Guignot, 1936
- Cybister hypomelas Régimbart, 1892
- Cybister janczyki Mouchamps, 1957
- Cybister javanus Aubé, 1838
- Cybister laevis Falkenström, 1936
- Cybister lateralimarginalis (De Geer, 1774)
  - Cybister lateralimarginalis ponticus Sharp, 1882
  - Cybister lateralimarginalis torquatus (Fischer von Waldheim, 1829)
- Cybister lewisianus Sharp, 1873
- Cybister limbatus (Fabricius, 1775)
- Cybister loxidiscus Wilke, 1920
- Cybister natalensis (Wehncke, 1876)
- Cybister nebulosus Gschwendtner, 1931
- Cybister occidentalis Aubé, 1838
- Cybister pectoralis Sharp, 1882
- Cybister pederzanii Rocchi, 1979
- Cybister poblanus Arce-Pérez, Novelo-Gutiérrez, & Fery, 2021
- Cybister reichei Aubé, 1838
- Cybister rugosus (W.S.Macleay, 1825)
- Cybister rugulosus (Redtenbacher, 1844)
- Cybister schoutedeni Gschwendtner, 1932
- Cybister semiaciculatus Schaufuss, 1887
- Cybister senegalensis Aubé, 1838
- Cybister straeleni Guignot, 1952
- Cybister tibialis Sharp, 1882
- Cybister tripunctatus (Olivier, 1795)
  - Cybister tripunctatus africanus Laporte, 1835
  - Cybister tripunctatus lateralis (Fabricius, 1798)
  - Cybister tripunctatus temnenkii Aubé, 1838
- Cybister ventralis Sharp, 1882
- Cybister weckwerthi Hendrich, 1997
- Cybister wittmeri Brancucci, 1979
- Cybister yulensis Guignot, 1956

=== Subgenus Megadytoides Brinck, 1945 ===
- Cybister marginicollis Boheman, 1848

=== Subgenus Melanectes Brinck, 1945 ===
- Cybister alemon Guignot, 1948
- Cybister aterrimus Régimbart, 1899
- Cybister basilewskyi Guignot, 1950
- Cybister bellicosus Guignot, 1947
- Cybister bimaculatus Aubé, 1838
- Cybister blotei Guignot, 1936
- Cybister brevis Aubé, 1838
- Cybister burgeoni Guignot, 1947
- Cybister convexus Sharp, 1882
- Cybister danxiaensis Jiang, Zhao, Mai, Jia & Hendrich, 2023
- Cybister dehaanii Aubé, 1838
- Cybister desjardinsii Aubé, 1838
- Cybister dissentiens Mouchamps, 1957
- Cybister distinctus Régimbart, 1878
- Cybister ertli Zimmermann, 1917
- Cybister feraudi Guignot, 1934
- Cybister griphodes Guignot, 1942
- Cybister immarginatus Fabricius, 1798)
- Cybister insignis Sharp, 1882
  - Cybister insignis caprai Guignot, 1949
  - Cybister insignis purpureovirgatus Guignot, 1946
- Cybister irritans (Dohrn, 1875)
- Cybister longulus Gschwendtner, 1932
- Cybister lynceus J.Balfour-Browne, 1950
- Cybister mesomelas Guignot, 1942
- Cybister mocquerysi Régimbart, 1895
- Cybister modestus Sharp, 1882
- Cybister nigrescens Gschwendtner, 1933
- Cybister nigripes Wehncke, 1876
- Cybister operosus Sharp, 1882
- Cybister owas Laporte, 1835
- Cybister papuanus Guignot, 1956
- Cybister pinguis Régimbart, 1895
- Cybister posticus Aubé, 1838
- Cybister procax Guignot, 1947
  - Cybister procax vicinatus Mouchamps, 1957
- Cybister prolixus Sharp, 1882
- Cybister semirugosus Harold, 1878
- Cybister siamensis Sharp, 1882
- Cybister smaragdinus Régimbart, 1895
- Cybister sugillatus Erichson, 1834
- Cybister sumatrensis Régimbart, 1883
- Cybister thermolytes Guignot, 1947
- Cybister vicinus Zimmermann, 1917
- Cybister vulneratus Klug, 1834
- Cybister zimmermanni Mouchamps, 1957

=== Subgenus Neocybister K.B. Miller, Bergsten & Whiting, 2007 ===
- Cybister festae Griffini, 1895
- Cybister puncticollis (Brullé, 1837)

=== Subgenus unknown ===
- Cybister parvus Trémouilles, 1984

=== Fossil species ===
These seven extinct species are known only from fossils:

- †Cybister agassizi Heer, 1862
- †Cybister atavus Heer, 1862
- †Cybister fractus Riha, 1974
- †Cybister imperfectus Riha, 1974
- †Cybister mancus Riha, 1974
- †Cybister nicoleti Heer, 1862
- †Cybister rotundatus Riha, 1974
