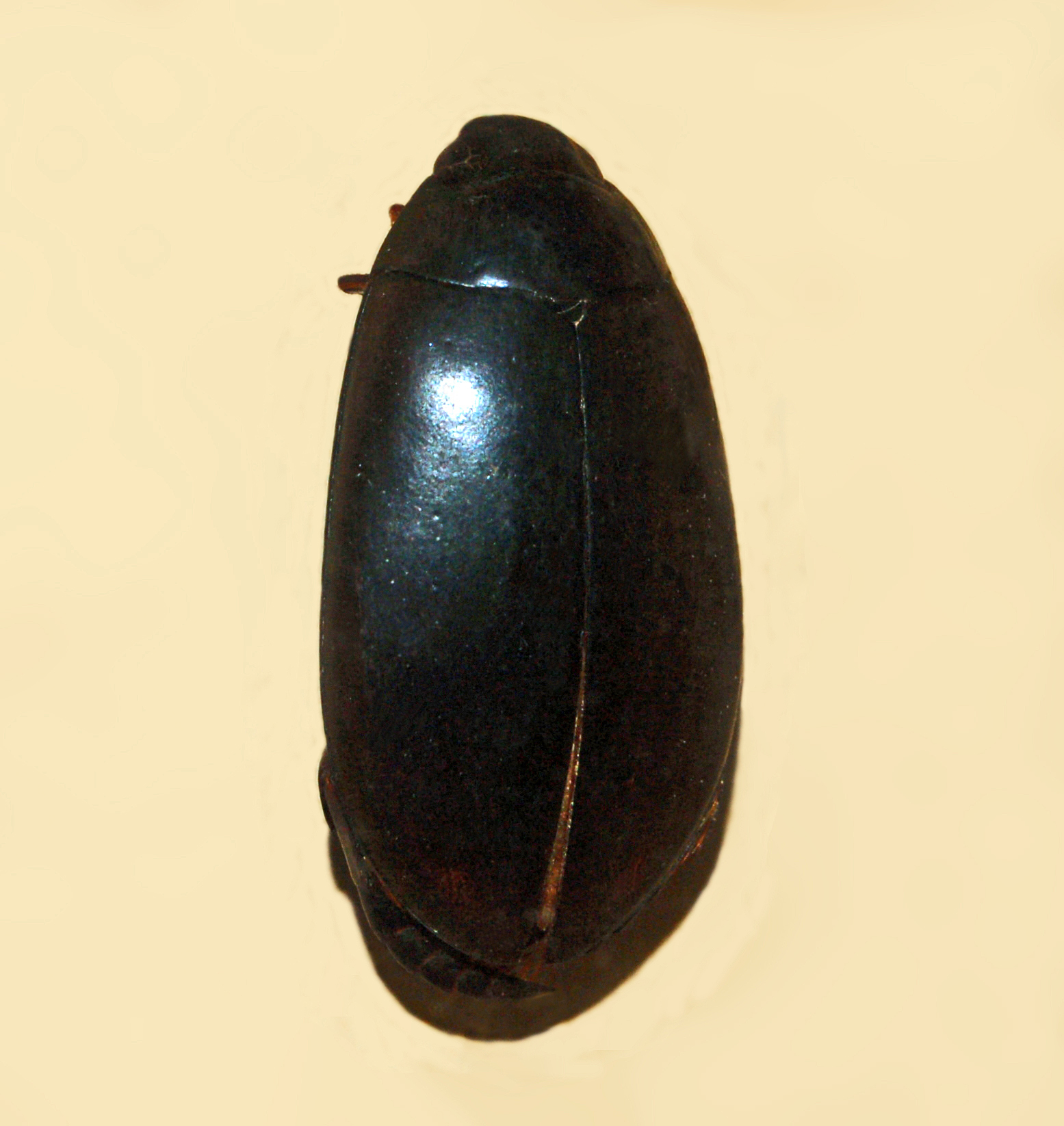
- Cybister immarginatus from Ethiopia

Scientific classification
- Kingdom: Animalia
- Phylum: Arthropoda
- Class: Insecta
- Order: Coleoptera
- Suborder: Adephaga
- Family: Dytiscidae
- Genus: Cybister
- Species: C. immarginatus

Binomial name
- Cybister immarginatus (Fabricius, 1798)

= Cybister immarginatus =

Species of beetle

Cybister immarginatus is a species of beetle in family Dytiscidae.
