= Nilssondytes =

Scientific classification
- Kingdom: Animalia
- Phylum: Arthropoda
- Class: Insecta
- Order: Coleoptera
- Suborder: Adephaga
- Family: Dytiscidae
- Genus: Nilssondytes
- Species: N. diversus

Binomial name
- Nilssondytes diversus Miller, Michat, and Ferreira, 2024

Genus of beetles

Nilssondytes is a genus of predaceous diving beetles in the family Dytiscidae. Following reclassification of the subfamily Cybistrinae in 2024, only a single species, Nilssondytes diversus, is included in the genus.
