= Cybister confusus =

Scientific classification
- Kingdom: Animalia
- Phylum: Arthropoda
- Class: Insecta
- Order: Coleoptera
- Suborder: Adephaga
- Family: Dytiscidae
- Genus: Cybister
- Species: C. confusus

Binomial name
- Cybister confusus Sharp, 1882

Species of beetle

Cybister confusus, is a species of predaceous diving beetle found in India, Bangladesh, Pakistan and Sri Lanka.

== Description ==
It is a carnivorous fresh water beetle commonly found in ponds.
