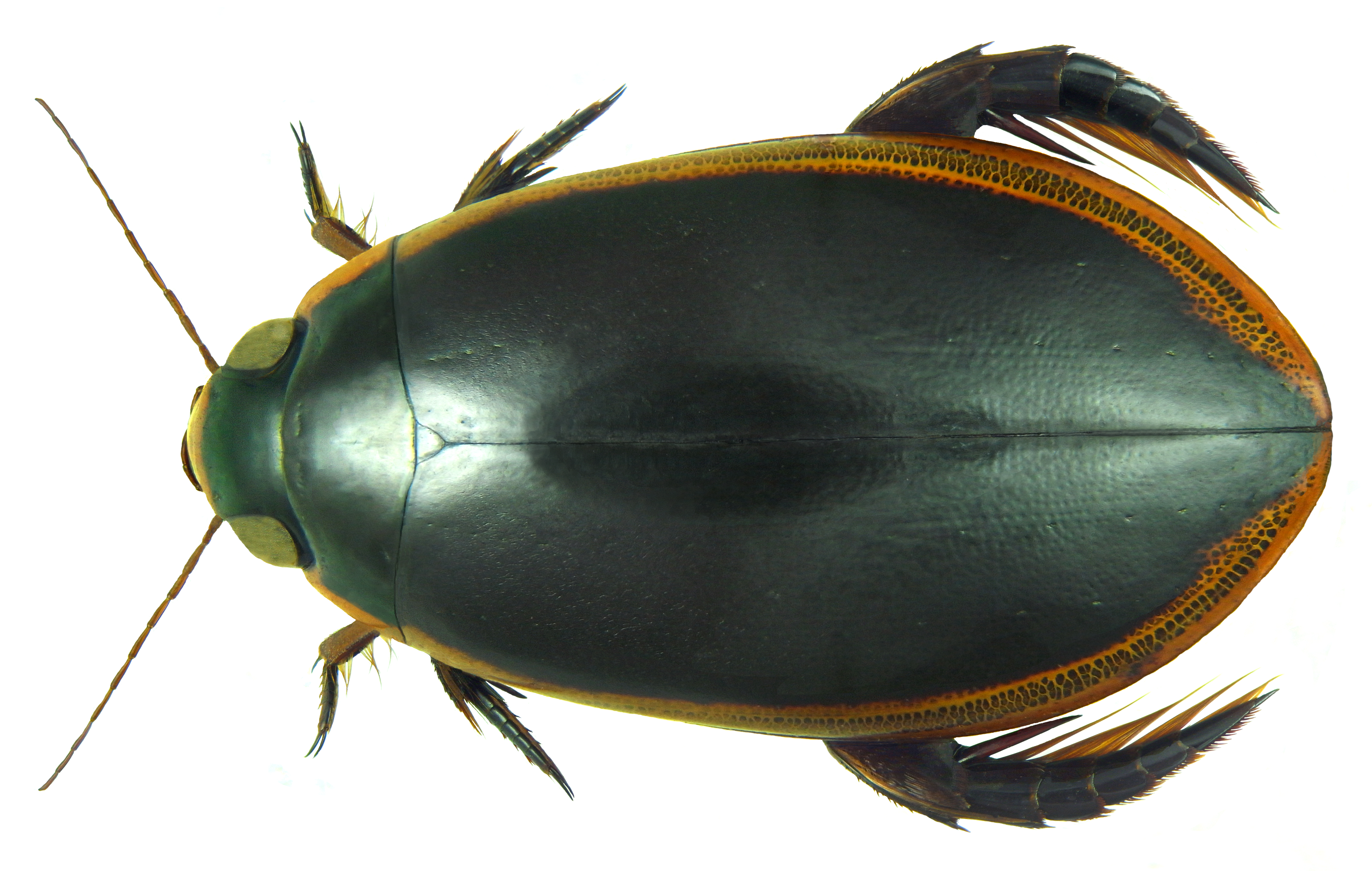
- subsp. lateralis female (dorsum)
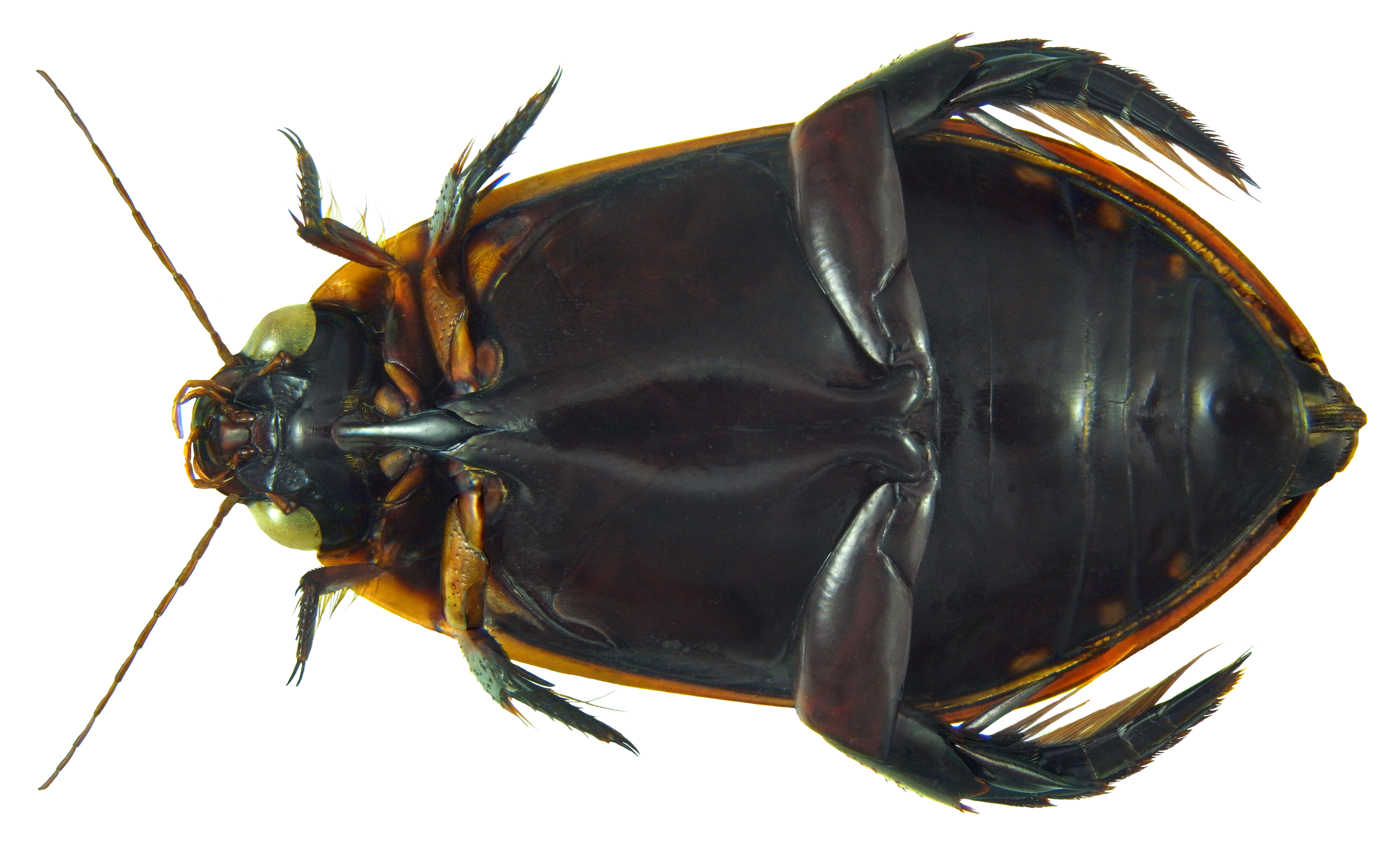
- subsp. lateralis female (ventrum)

Scientific classification
- Kingdom: Animalia
- Phylum: Arthropoda
- Clade: Pancrustacea
- Class: Insecta
- Order: Coleoptera
- Suborder: Adephaga
- Family: Dytiscidae
- Genus: Cybister
- Species: C. tripunctatus

Binomial name
- Cybister tripunctatus (Olivier, 1795)

Synonyms
- Cybister asiaticus Sharp, 1882; Cybister tripunctatus asiaticus Regimbart, 1899

= Cybister tripunctatus =

Species of beetle

Cybister tripunctatus, is a species of predaceous diving beetle found in India, Andaman & Nicobar Islands, Sri Lanka, Afghanistan, Bangladesh, Myanmar, Nepal, Pakistan, Bhutan, China, Cyprus, Iran, Iraq, Japan, Kyrgyzstan, Mongolia, Russia, Syria, Tajikistan, Turkmenistan, Italy, Turkey, Uzbekistan and Europe.

== Description ==
Nominate subspecies has a typical length is about 28 mm. A carnivorous large beetle feeds on tadpoles, fish, and aquatic insects such as Culex spp., chironomids, and notonectid nymphs, damselfly larvae, Pantala flavescens. It also feeds on sympatric relatives such as Cybister brevis and Cybister chinensis.

== Subspecies ==
Six subspecies identified.

- Cybister tripunctatus africanus Laporte, 1835
- Cybister tripunctatus asiaticus Sharp, 1882
- Cybister tripunctatus lateralis (Fabricius, 1798)
- Cybister tripunctatus orientalis Gschwendtner, 1931
- Cybister tripunctatus temnenkii Aubé, 1838
- Cybister tripunctatus tripunctatus (Olivier, 1795)

The subspecies orientalis has a body length of about 24 to 29 mm. It is found in China, the Korean Peninsula, Taiwan, and Japan. Subspecies lateralis characterized with typical length of 21 to 30 mm and not fringed with any ciliae of hind margins of the four basal metatarsal segments. pronotum and elytra with lateral reddish margins, elytral lateral margins extending to and including the epipleurae. Subspecies africanus known to live in retro-dune ponds, mouths and residual pools of small streams, preferably on muddy substrates.

Subspecies asiaticus with following features: Head black, with greenish metallic iridescence. Pronotum black and shiny with greenish metallic iridescence. There is a yellowish lateral stripe on pronotum. Elytra blackish with greenish metallic iridescence with yellow lateral borders.

== Gallery ==
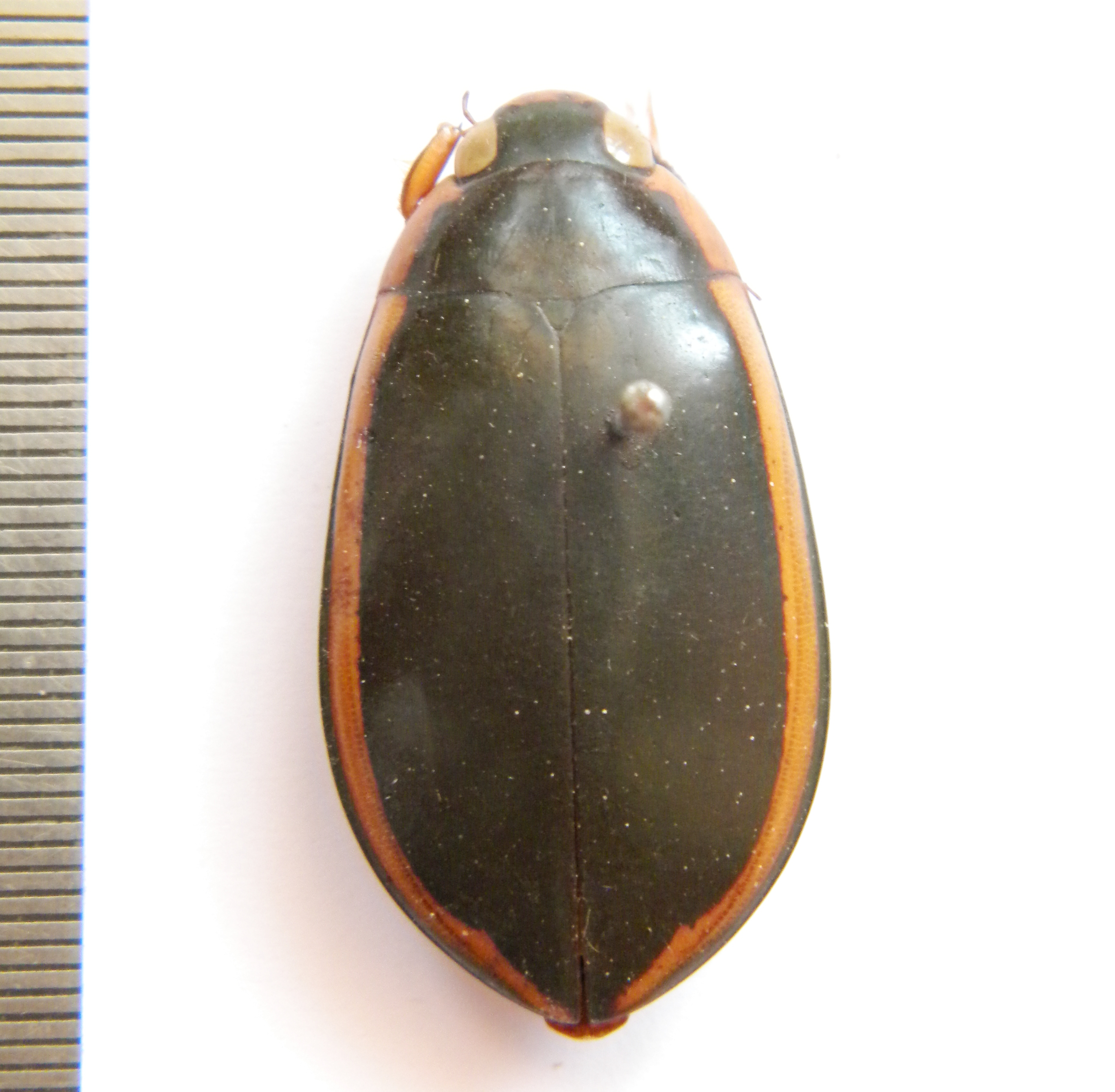

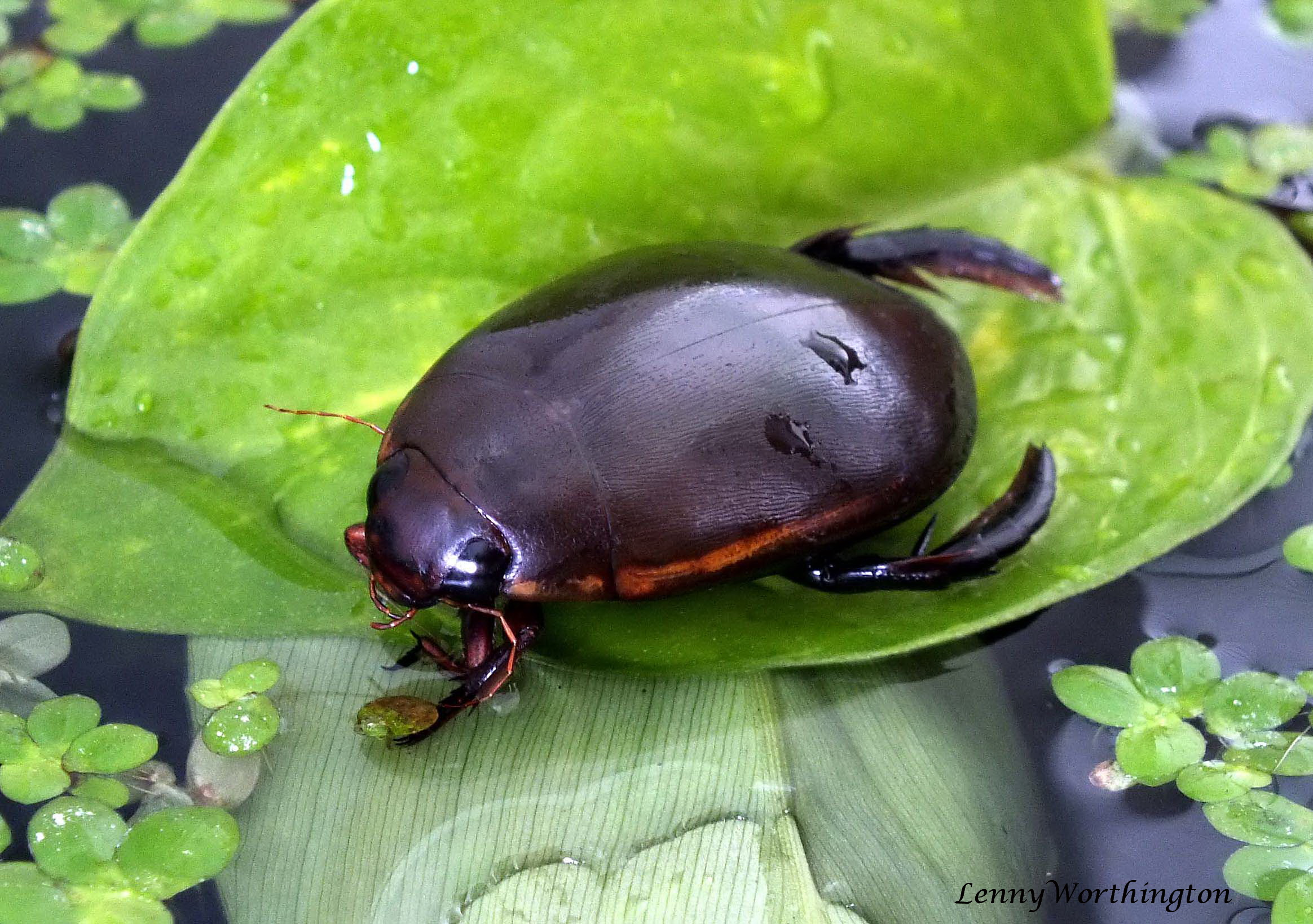
in Thailand

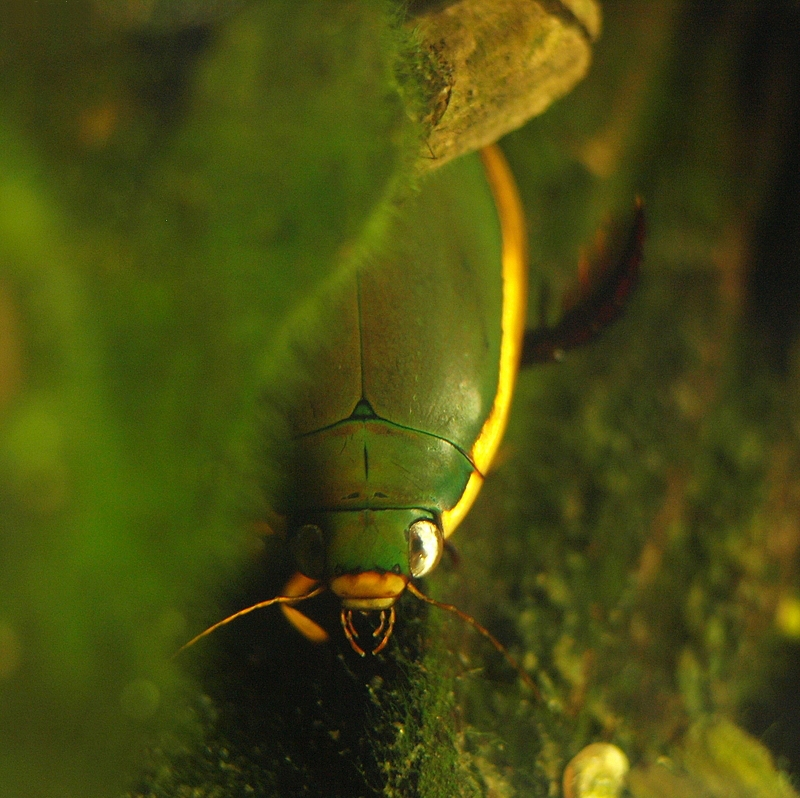
ssp. orientalis
