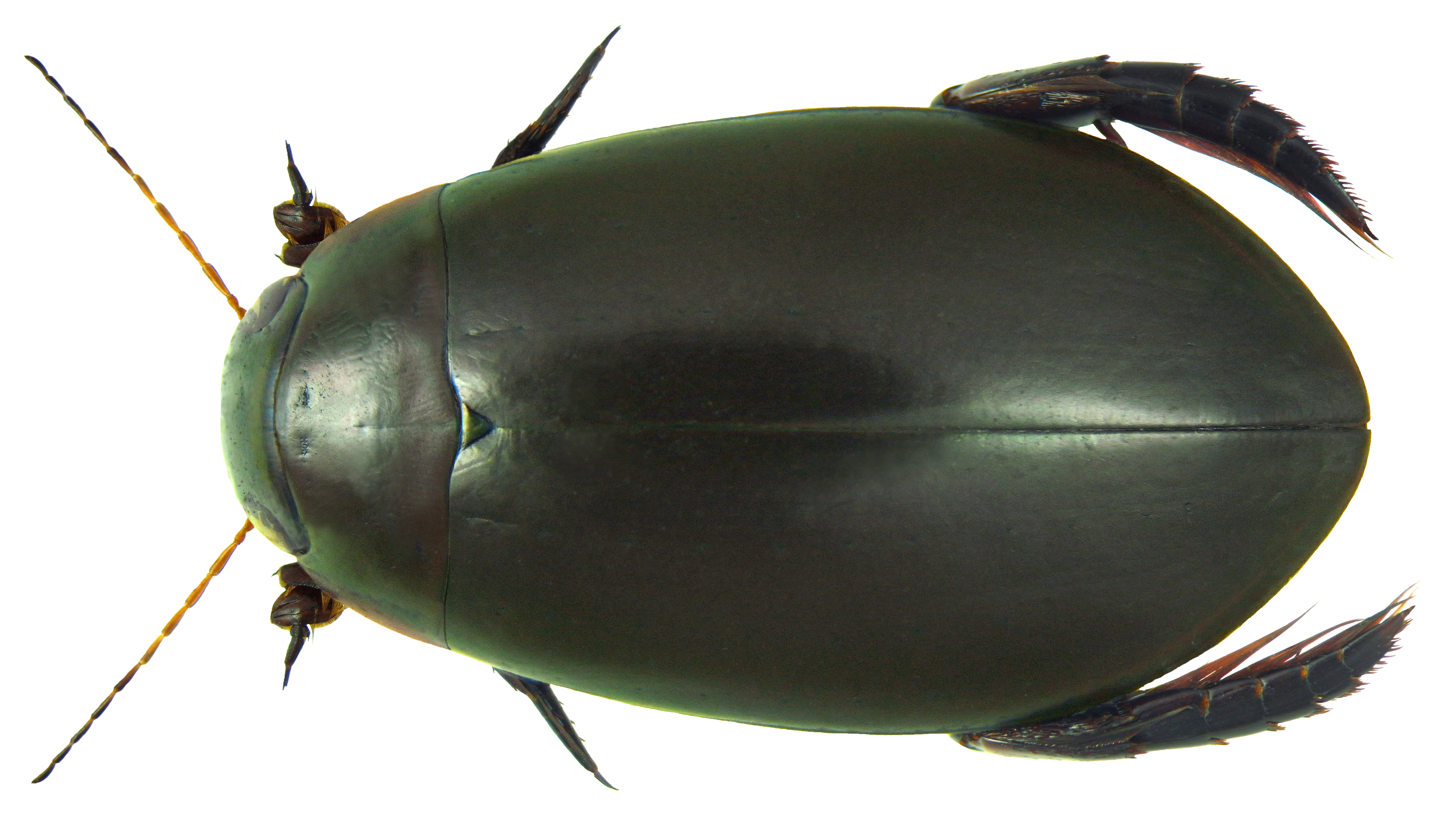

Scientific classification
- Kingdom: Animalia
- Phylum: Arthropoda
- Class: Insecta
- Order: Coleoptera
- Suborder: Adephaga
- Family: Dytiscidae
- Genus: Cybister
- Species: C. sugillatus

Binomial name
- Cybister sugillatus Erichson, 1834

Synonyms
- Cybister bisignatus Aubé, 1838; Cybister notasicus Aubé, 1838; Cybister olivaceus Boheman, 1858

= Cybister sugillatus =

Species of beetle

Cybister sugillatus, is a species of predaceous diving beetle found in India, Sri Lanka, Afghanistan, Bhutan, Myanmar, Nepal, Pakistan, China, Indonesia, Japan, and Philippines.
