= Cybister extenuans =

Scientific classification
- Kingdom: Animalia
- Phylum: Arthropoda
- Class: Insecta
- Order: Coleoptera
- Suborder: Adephaga
- Family: Dytiscidae
- Genus: Cybister
- Species: C. extenuans

Binomial name
- Cybister extenuans (Walker, 1858)

Synonyms
- Dytiscus extenuans Walker, 1858; Cybister (Meganectes) extenuans (Walker, 1858); Cybister wehnckianus Sharp, 1882

Species of beetle

Cybister extenuans, is a species of predaceous diving beetle found in India and Sri Lanka.
