= Cybister nebulosus =

Scientific classification
- Kingdom: Animalia
- Phylum: Arthropoda
- Clade: Pancrustacea
- Class: Insecta
- Order: Coleoptera
- Suborder: Adephaga
- Family: Dytiscidae
- Genus: Cybister
- Species: C. nebulosus

Binomial name
- Cybister nebulosus Gschwendtner, 1931

Species of diving beetle

Cybister nebulosus is a species of giant predaceous diving beetle in the genus Cybister. It was first published in 1931 in the German-based entomology journal Entomologische Blätter by Leopald Gschwendter.

== Habitat ==
It lives in bodies of freshwater, such as ponds, lakes, and slow-moving streams with vegetation.
