= Cybister javanus =

Scientific classification
- Kingdom: Animalia
- Phylum: Arthropoda
- Class: Insecta
- Order: Coleoptera
- Suborder: Adephaga
- Family: Dytiscidae
- Genus: Cybister
- Species: C. javanus

Binomial name
- Cybister javanus Aubé, 1838

Synonyms
- Cybister (Meganectes) javanus Aubé, 1838

Species of beetle

Cybister javanus, is a species of predaceous diving beetle found in India, Sri Lanka and Indonesia.
