= Cybister prolixus =

Scientific classification
- Kingdom: Animalia
- Phylum: Arthropoda
- Clade: Pancrustacea
- Class: Insecta
- Order: Coleoptera
- Suborder: Adephaga
- Family: Dytiscidae
- Genus: Cybister
- Species: C. prolixus

Binomial name
- Cybister prolixus Sharp, 1882

Synonyms
- Cybister (Melanectes) prolixus Sharp, 1882

Species of beetle

Cybister prolixus, is a species of predaceous diving beetle found in Sri Lanka.
