= Cybister dejeanii =

Scientific classification
- Kingdom: Animalia
- Phylum: Arthropoda
- Class: Insecta
- Order: Coleoptera
- Suborder: Adephaga
- Family: Dytiscidae
- Genus: Cybister
- Species: C. dejeanii

Binomial name
- Cybister dejeanii Aubé, 1838

Synonyms
- Cybister (Cybister) dejeanii Aubé, 1838

Species of beetle

Cybister dejeanii, is a species of predaceous diving beetle found in India and Sri Lanka.
