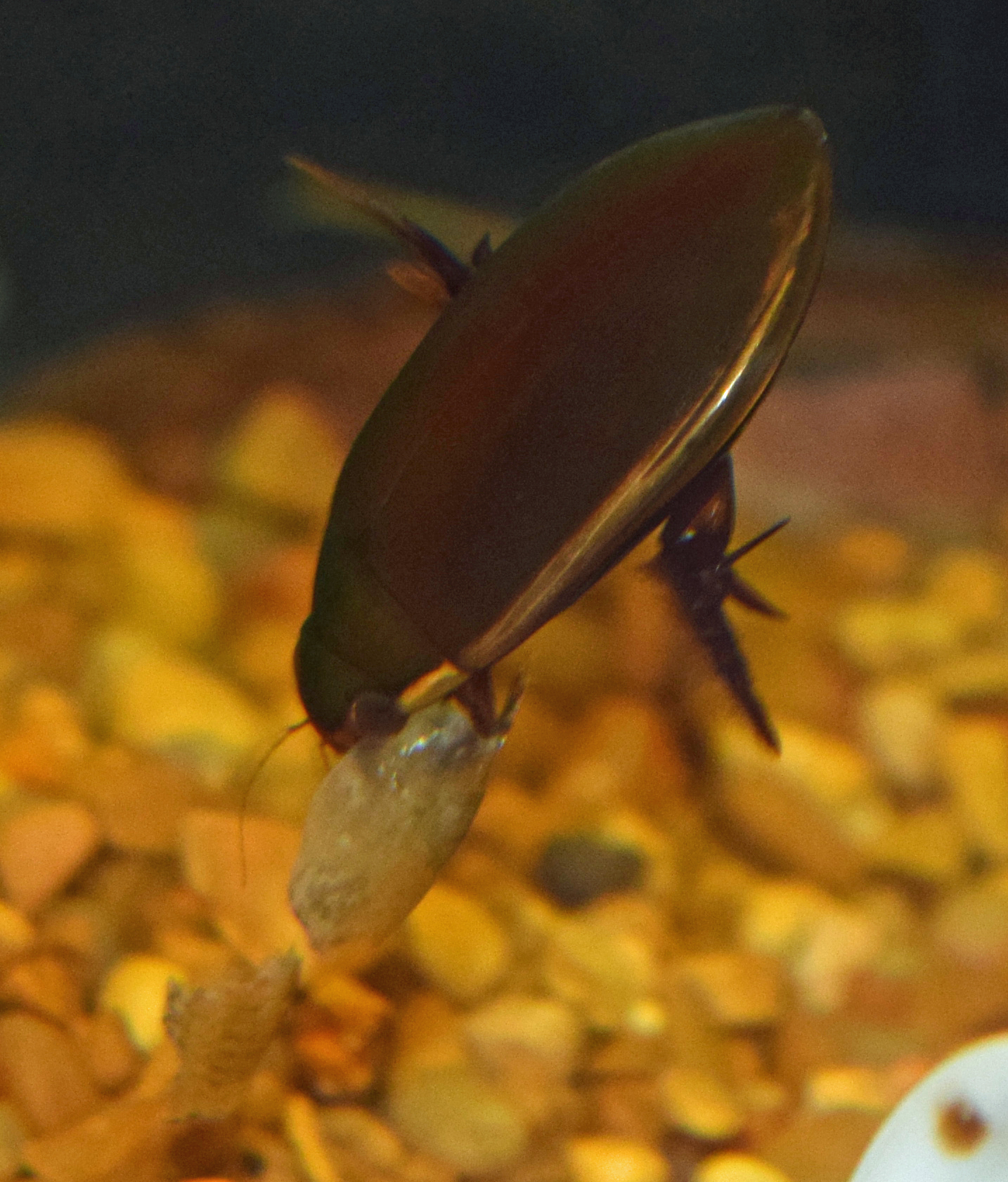

Scientific classification
- Domain: Eukaryota
- Kingdom: Animalia
- Phylum: Arthropoda
- Class: Insecta
- Order: Coleoptera
- Suborder: Adephaga
- Family: Dytiscidae
- Genus: Cybister
- Species: C. fimbriolatus

Binomial name
- Cybister fimbriolatus (Say, 1825)

= Cybister fimbriolatus =

Species of beetle

Cybister fimbriolatus, the giant diving beetle, is a species of predaceous diving beetle in the family Dytiscidae. It is found in North America and the Neotropics.

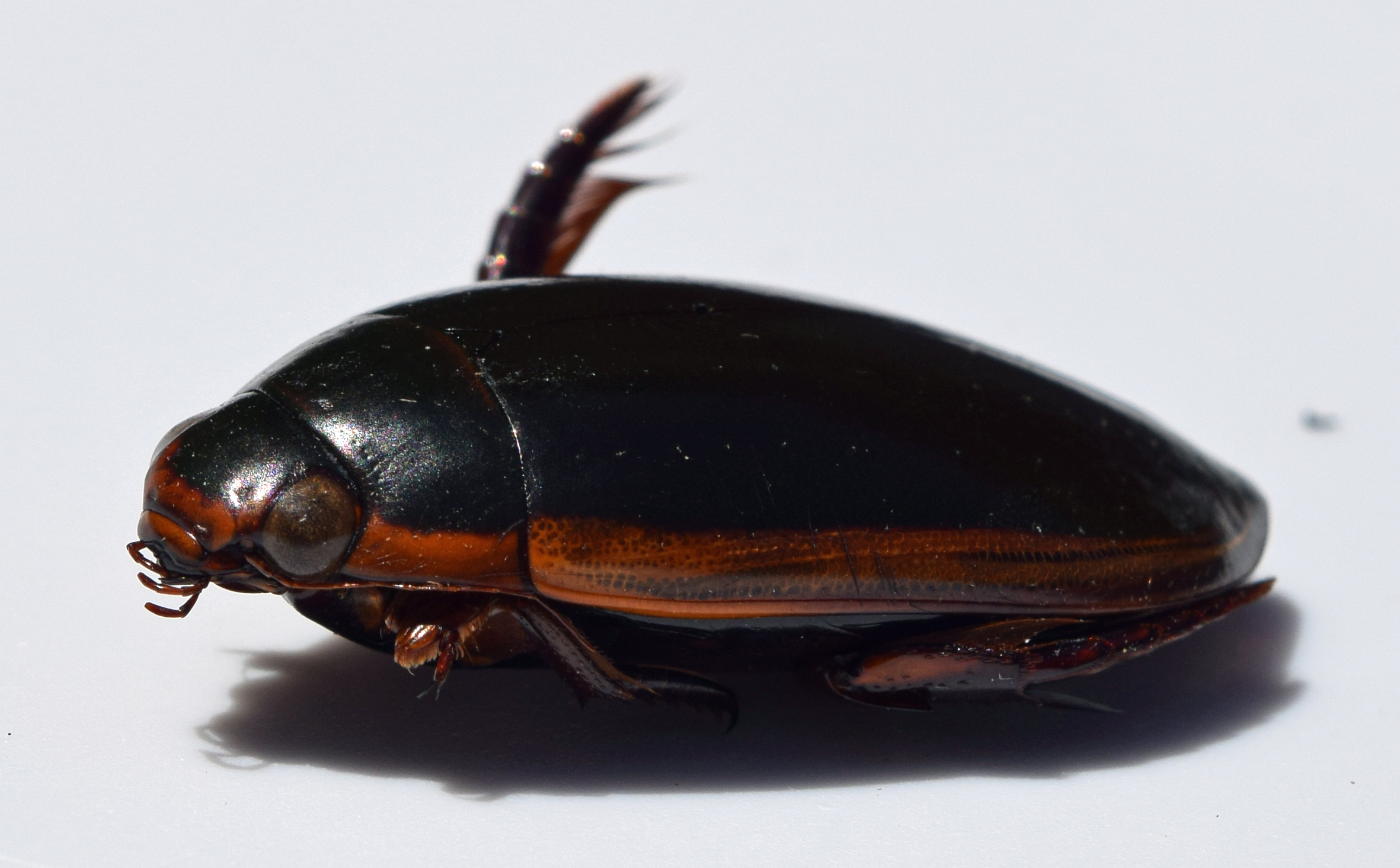
Giant diving beetle, Cybister fimbriolatus

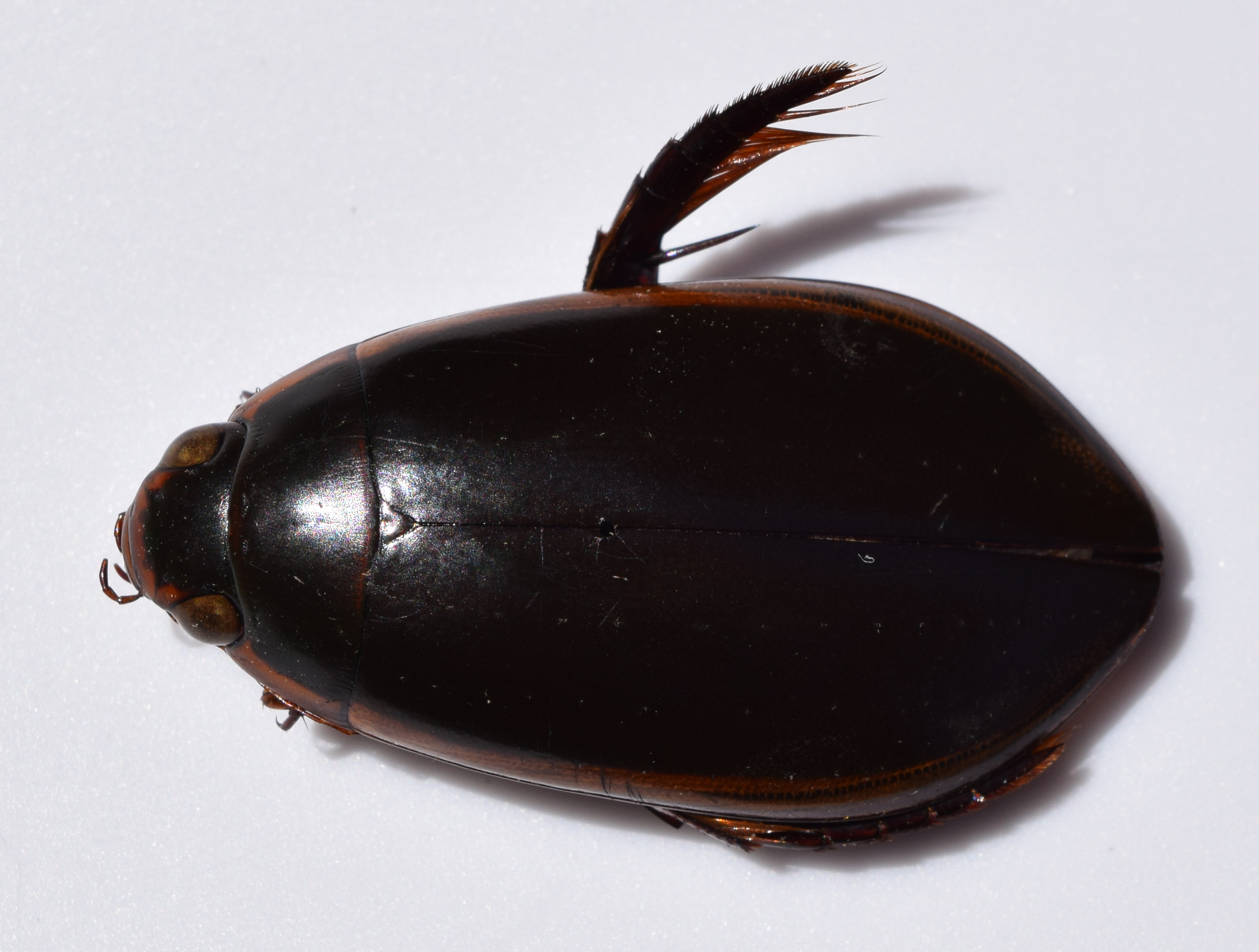
Giant diving beetle, Cybister fimbriolatus

== Overview ==
These beetles are active in summer and live in ponds or ditches, feeding on other aquatic arthropods. They are nocturnal but sometimes active during the day. For mating, the males have expanded front feet to help them grab hold of a female.

== Taxonomy ==
=== Subspecies ===
There were formerly two subspecies that belonged to the species Cybister fimbriolatus:

- Cybister fimbriolatus crotchi Wilke, 1920
- Cybister fimbriolatus fimbriolatus (Say, 1825)

=== Synonyms ===
The species has these synonyms:

- Dytiscus dissimilis (Dejean, 1821)
- Dytiscus fimbriolatus (Say, 1823)
- Cybister flavocinctus (Aubé, 1838)
- Cybister dissimilis (Aubé, 1838)
- Cybister ellipticus (LeConte, 1852)
- Cybister cavicollis (Sharp, 1887)
- Cybister crotchi (Wilke, 1920)
