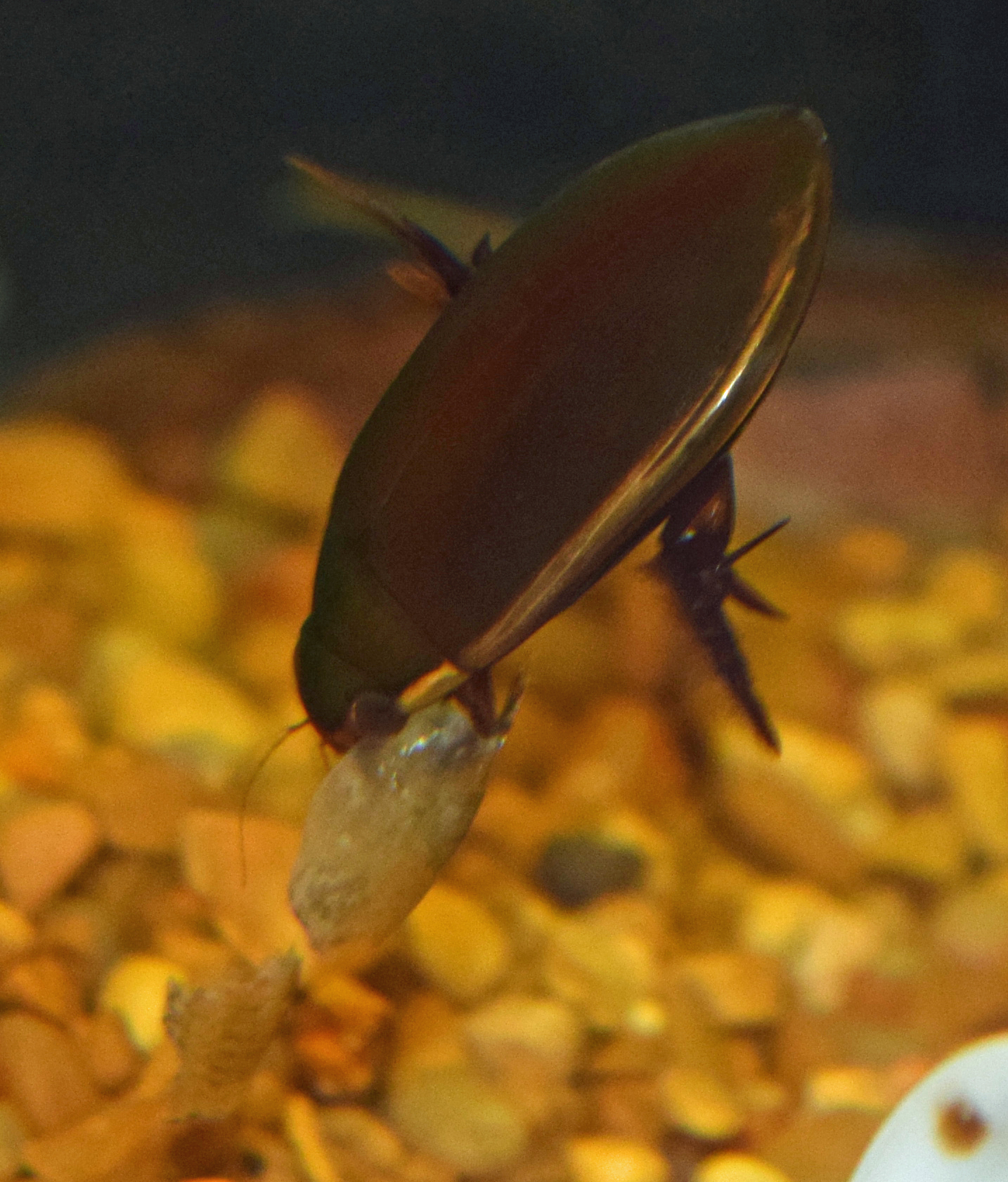
- Cybister fimbriolatus

Scientific classification
- Kingdom: Animalia
- Phylum: Arthropoda
- Class: Insecta
- Order: Coleoptera
- Suborder: Adephaga
- Family: Dytiscidae
- Subfamily: Cybistrinae
- Tribe: Cybistrini; Sharp, 1880

= Cybistrini =

Tribe of beetles

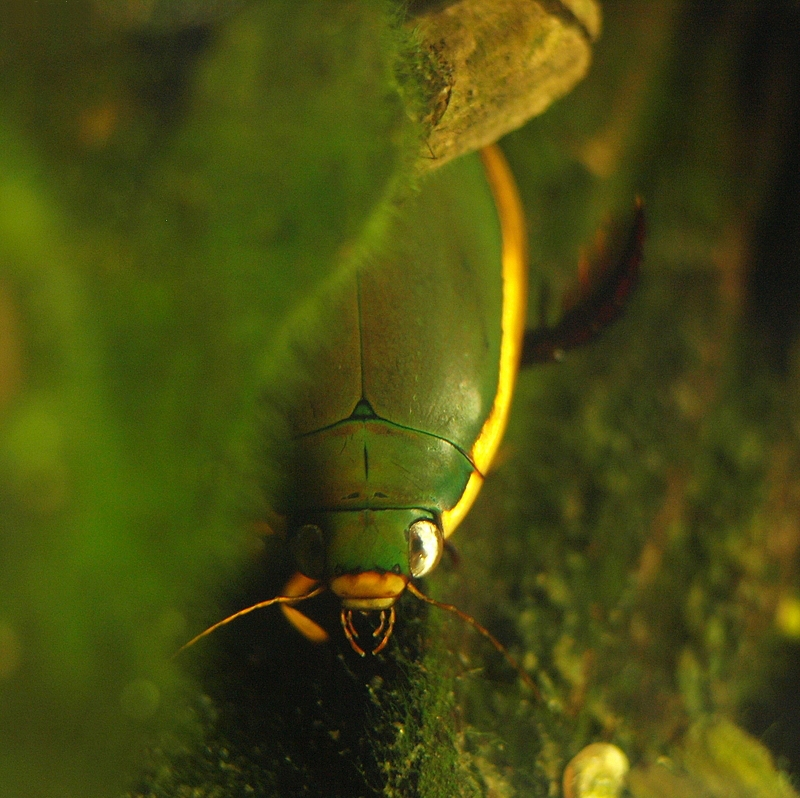
Cybister tripunctatus

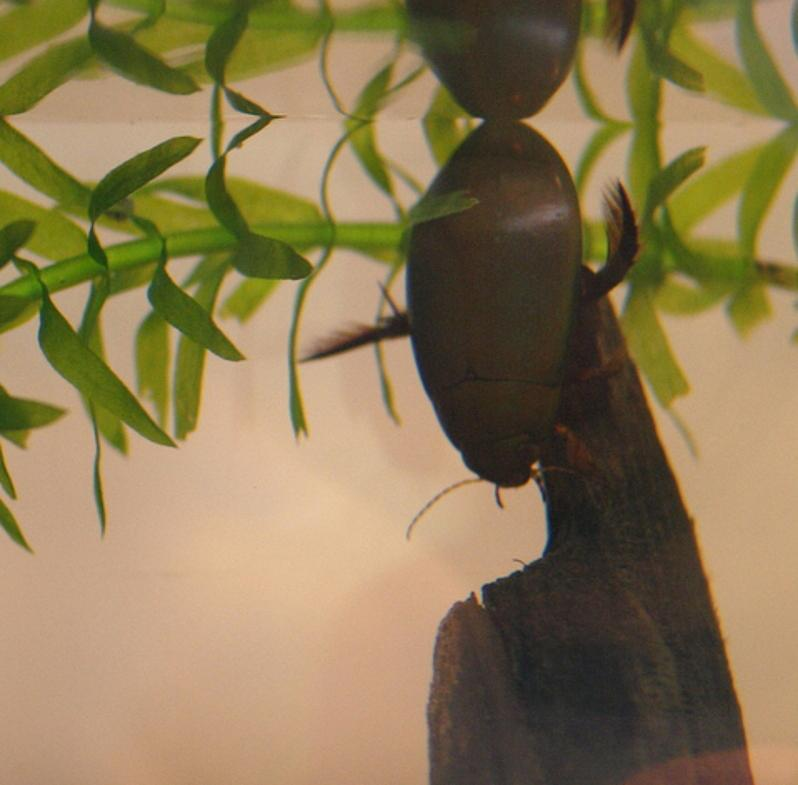
Cybister brevis

Cybistrini is a tribe of predaceous diving beetles in the family Dytiscidae. There are 12 genera and 130 described extant species in Cybistrini. The same set is also called Cybistrinae by authors viewing it as a subfamily of Dytiscidae.

== Genera ==
These twelve genera belong to the tribe Cybistrini:

- Austrodytes Watts, 1978
- Bifurcitus Brinck, 1945
- Cybister Curtis, 1827
- Nilssondytes Miller, Michat, & Ferreira Jr., 2024
- Megadytes Sharp, 1882
- Metaxydytes Miller, Michat, & Ferreira Jr., 2024
- Paramegadytes Trémouilles & Bachmann, 1980
- Onychohydrus Schaum & White, 1847
- Regimbartina Chatanay, 1911
- Spencerhydrus Sharp, 1882
- Sternhydrus Brinck, 1945
- Trifurcitus Brinck, 1945

== Unknown genus ==
It is unknown which genus the following Neotropical species belong to:

- ?? costalis (Fabricius, 1775)
- ?? obovatus (Kirby, 1826)
- "Megadytes species, IR57" (undescribed species, Ribera et al. 2008)
