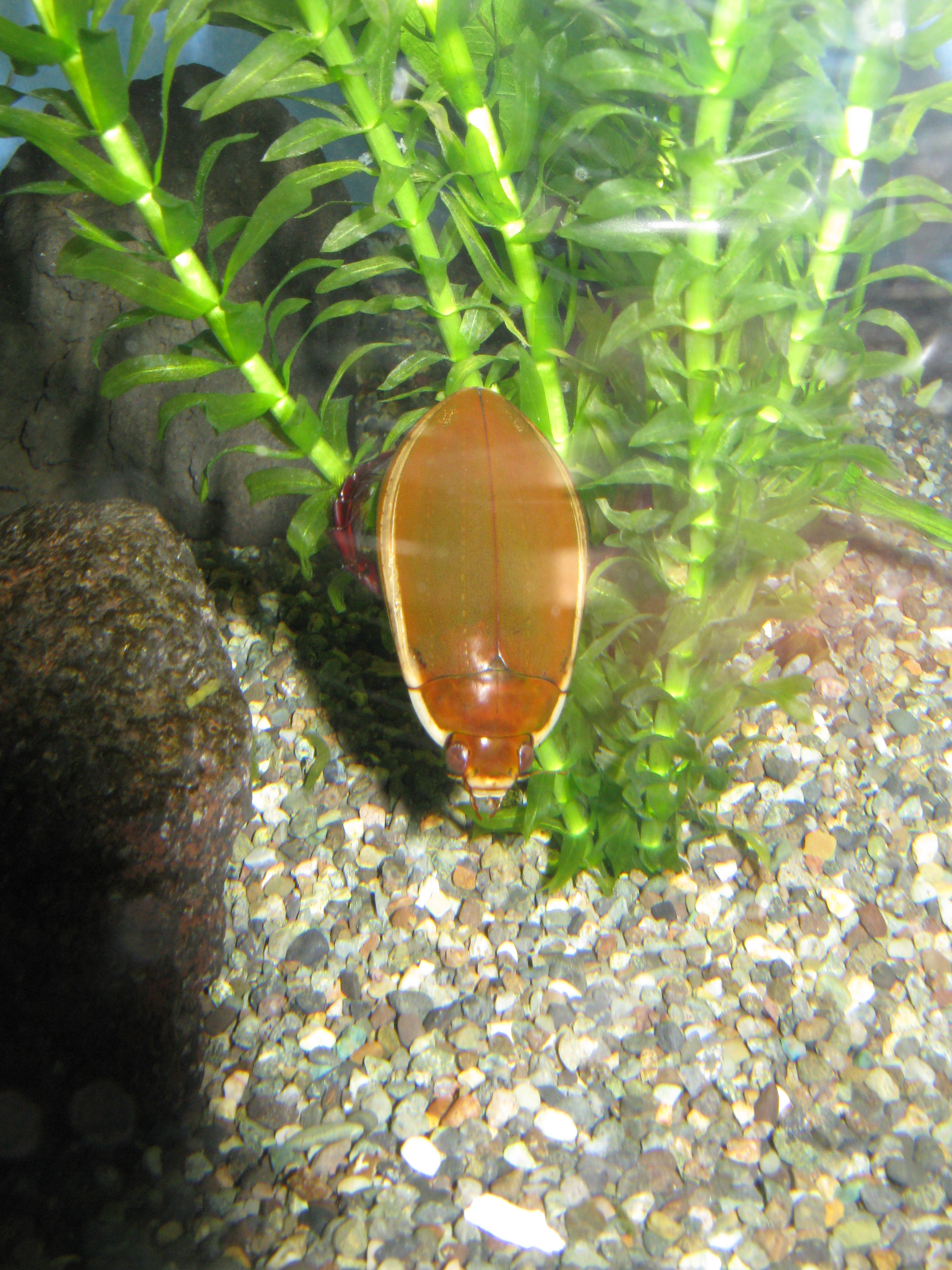
- male Cybister chinensis

Scientific classification
- Kingdom: Animalia
- Phylum: Arthropoda
- Clade: Pancrustacea
- Class: Insecta
- Order: Coleoptera
- Suborder: Adephaga
- Family: Dytiscidae
- Genus: Cybister
- Species: C. chinensis

Binomial name
- Cybister chinensis Motschulsky, 1854

Synonyms
- Cybister japonicus Sharp, 1873

= Cybister chinensis =

Species of beetle

Cybister chinensis is a species of diving beetle native to East Asia. It is predatory, feeding on tadpoles, small fish and aquatic insects, and adults are about 3.3–4.2 cm (1.3–1.7 in) long.

== In culture ==
This beetle is the focus of the Water Beetle Song (물방개 노래), a traditional Korean children's song. It reveals this beetle's shape and movement were the inspiration for Imjin War naval officer and scientist-shipbuilder Na Dae-yong's design of his turtle ship. He is known to have sighted one spinning around in a reservoir. Set at this pivotal moment, the song is written in his voice as he praises how well the beetle spins and tells it he will build a ship resembling it. He declares that his invention will defeat the marine enemies to come. This way, he foretells the future Imjin War. To this day, Na Dae-yong's descendants have been passing down the Water Beetle Song orally. It has also been attested from Naju, his city of origin, along with from Oryun-dong.
