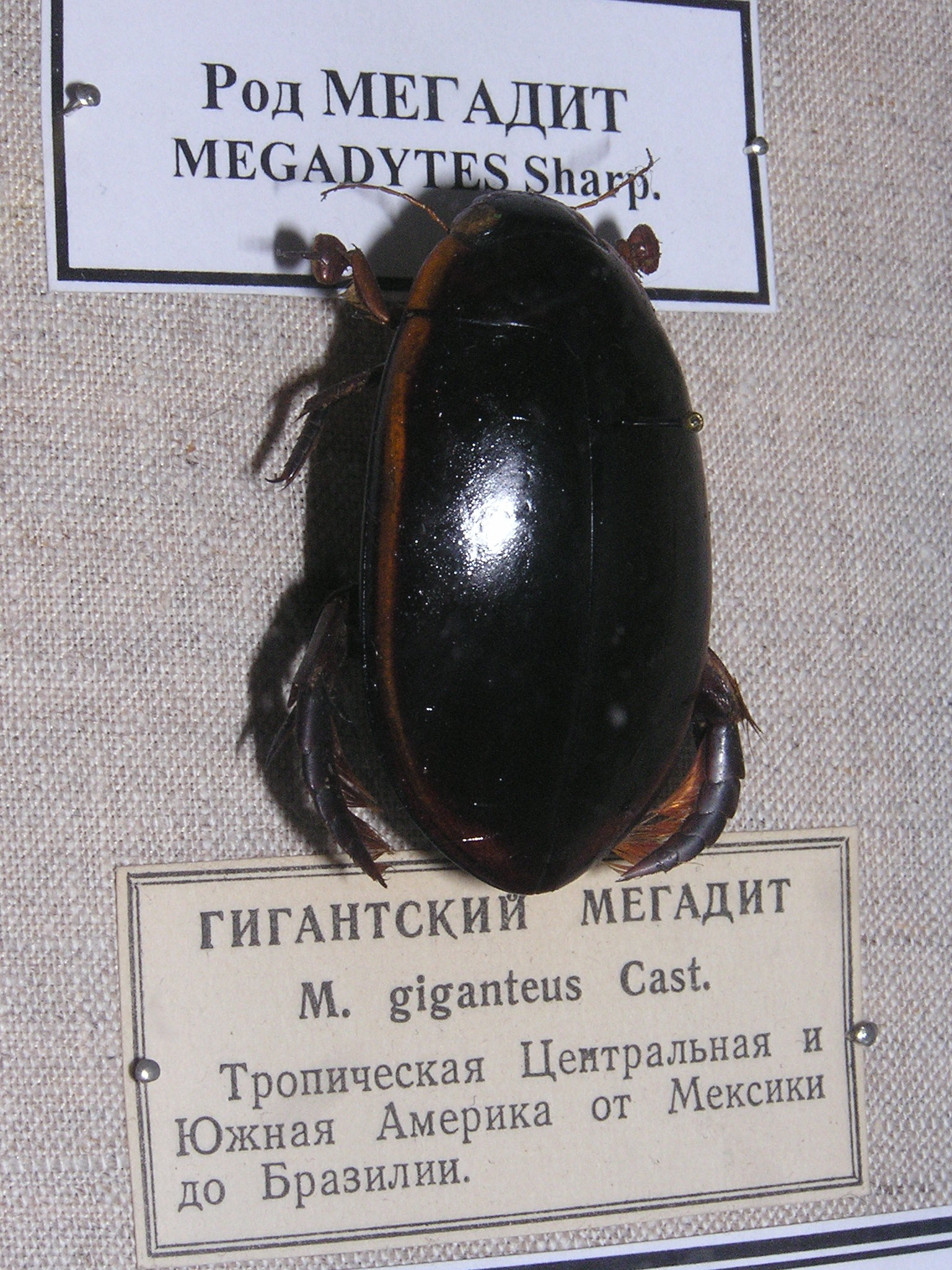
- Bifurcitus lherminieri in the Saint Petersburg Zoological Museum

Scientific classification
- Kingdom: Animalia
- Phylum: Arthropoda
- Clade: Pancrustacea
- Class: Insecta
- Order: Coleoptera
- Suborder: Adephaga
- Family: Dytiscidae
- Genus: Bifurcitus
- Species: B. lherminieri

Binomial name
- Bifurcitus lherminieri (Guérin-Méneville, 1829)

Synonyms
- Megadytes lherminieri (Guérin-Méneville, 1829); Dytiscus lherminieri Guérin-Méneville, 1829; Cybister giganteus Laporte, 1835; Trogus olivieri Crotch, 1872

= Bifurcitus lherminieri =

Species of beetle

Bifurcitus lherminieri, formerly Megadytes lherminieri, is a species in the genus Bifurcitus of large diving beetles found in the Neotropics.
