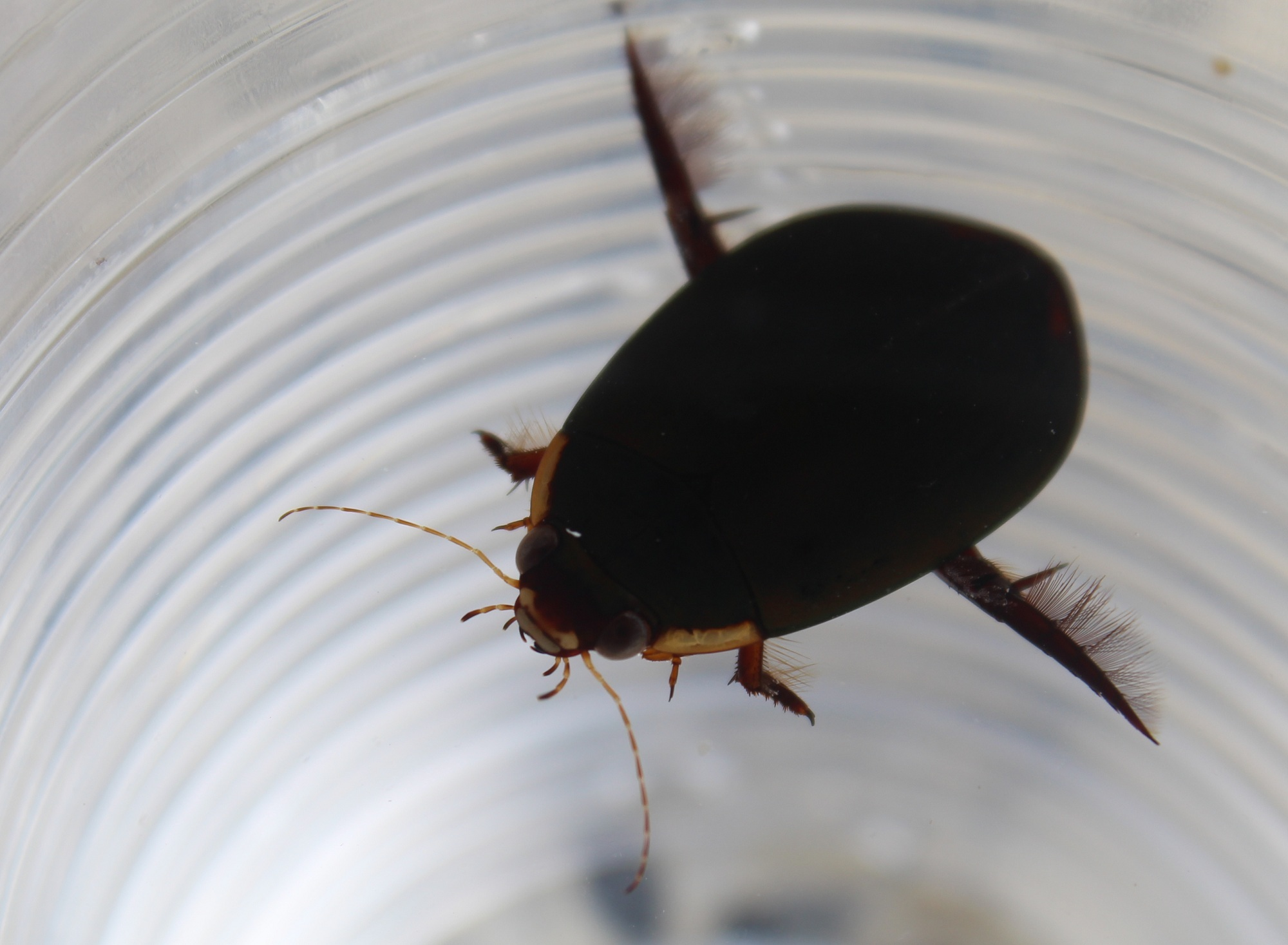
- Megadytes sp.

Scientific classification
- Kingdom: Animalia
- Phylum: Arthropoda
- Class: Insecta
- Order: Coleoptera
- Suborder: Adephaga
- Family: Dytiscidae
- Tribe: Cybistrini
- Genus: Megadytes; Sharp, 1882

= Megadytes =

Genus of beetles

Megadytes is a genus of diving beetles in the family Dytiscidae. They are found in slow-moving or static freshwater habitats in the Neotropics. The adult beetles measure about 1.65–4.75 cm (0.6–1.9 in) long depending on the exact species and the largest is also the largest in the family (together with certain Dytiscus).

== Species ==
Following reclassification in 2024, Megadytes now contains two described species:

- Megadytes latus (Fabricius, 1801)
- Megadytes parvus Trémouilles, 1984
