= Ann Timothy =

- Born: Ann Donovan circa 1727
- Died: September 11, 1792 (Note: Her date of death was reported as "yesterday" (September 11, 1792) in a newspaper dated September 12, 1792. Her date of death was also reported on October 11, 1792 in various American newspapers, without a date of death. She died at about 65 years of age in Charleston, South Carolina.); Charleston, South Carolina, US
- Occupation: Newspaper publisher
- Known for: One of the few women newspaper printers in Colonial America
- Spouse: Peter Timothy
- Relatives: Elizabeth Timothy (mother-in-law)

Ann Timothy (ca. 1727–September 11, 1792) was a newspaper publisher from South Carolina. She worked alongside her husband until his death in 1782, and after she had published by herself for years, she became the official printer for the state of South Carolina.

== Personal life ==
Ann Donovan was born circa 1727. (Note: She may have been born in Charleston, South Carolina, and she may be related to Daniel Donovan, who immigrated to the state between 1670 and 1698. A Daniel Donavan's will was probated on February 14, 1728–1729 in Charleston, South Carolina. His household included his wife Ann, son Daniel, daughter Ann, and at least two enslaved women, both of whom were named Dinnah. One of the executors was Will Greenland, his brother. His other executors were his wife, Peter Cabe, and William Bellinger. A Daniel Donovan was a witness to the will of Mary Izard in 1687.) She married Peter Timothy on December 8, 1745 in Charleston, South Carolina. Peter was the son of Elizabeth Timothy who operated the first permanent newspaper in South Carolina. Ann and Peter were believed to have had fifteen children, but seven of whom died as infants. (Note: Peter Timothy wrote to Benjamin Franklin in 1772 that he had lost eight sons to teething.) Their children include Elizabeth–Ann and Frances–Claudia, who were on their own or married by 1780. The remaining children at that time were Anne, Sarah, Robert, Sarah, and Benjamin Franklin.

== Career ==
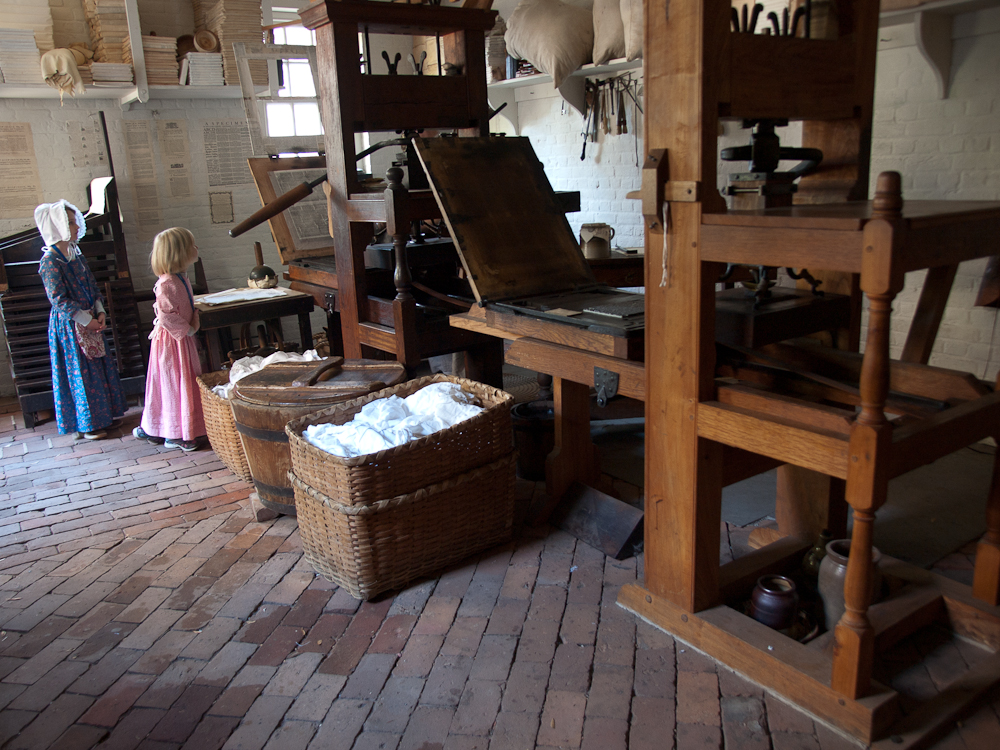
An eighteenth century printing press

Timothy and her husband took over publishing the South Carolina Gazette from Peter's mother, Elizabeth Timothy. Peter wrote to Benjamin Franklin in 1772 that he was unable to continue publishing due to poor eyesight. He announced that he had pursued other lines of business, and also suggested that he would welcome "any Employment in His Majesty’s Service, that will not degrade me, which any Friend may think me fit for or can procure by his Interest." After a break from March 1772 to November 1773, Peter resumed running the printing business. There were intermittent periods where the newspaper was not printed, such as the destruction of the printing press due to fire.

After the Declaration of Independence was signed in 1776, Peter printed broadside copies of the Declaration which were then hung in public places. To show his support, but also to identify himself as a revolutionary, Peter took the singular step by printers across the country to add “CHARLES-TOWN, Printed by PETER TIMOTHY” at the bottom of the document.

In February 1780, the newspaper was suspended as the British approached the city for what became the Siege of Charleston from March 29, 1780 to May 12, 1780. Peter was subsequently captured and exiled to a prison in St. Augustine, Florida for ten months for failing to take the loyalty oath. He was unable to return to Charleston.

Peter set sail for Santo Domingo within the West Indies in 1782, Two of his daughters and a grandchild met up with Peter in Philadelphia, intending to travel to Antigua to visit one of his daughters. They perished during a storm off of the Delaware coast. Peter and Ann's surviving children at that point were Sarah, Robert (disabled), and Benjamin Franklin Timothy.

Timothy resumed operating the newspaper on July 16, 1783, after the death of Peter, upon the removal of the British from the city, and after peace was restored. The newspaper operated out of the John Lining House at 106 Broad Street from 1783 to 1793. (Note: An apothecary operated from the same building beginning in the 1780s.) From 1785 to 1792, she was the official "Printer to the State. She worked until her death in 1792. Timothy was said in death notices to be very worthy and valuable. Her son, Benjamin Franklin Timothy, continued the family printing business with the September 20, 1792 edition.

== Legacy ==
She was one of a few women publishers before and shortly after the American Revolution. Since printing was often a multi-generational family business, there were some printing families with two or more generations of women printers, which was the case with Timothy and her mother-in-law, Elizabeth Timothy. It was often a financial necessity for widowed women in the printing profession to carry on the business. There were at least six women who were the official printers for various colonial governments, as Timothy did for the state of South Carolina. According to a syndicated article, "Helped the Colonial Cause": "In nearly every case they advocated the colonial cause, and their editorials did much to arouse the spirit of patriotism in the men."

== See also ==
- List of women printers and publishers before 1800
