= Committees of correspondence =

18th-century American political organizations

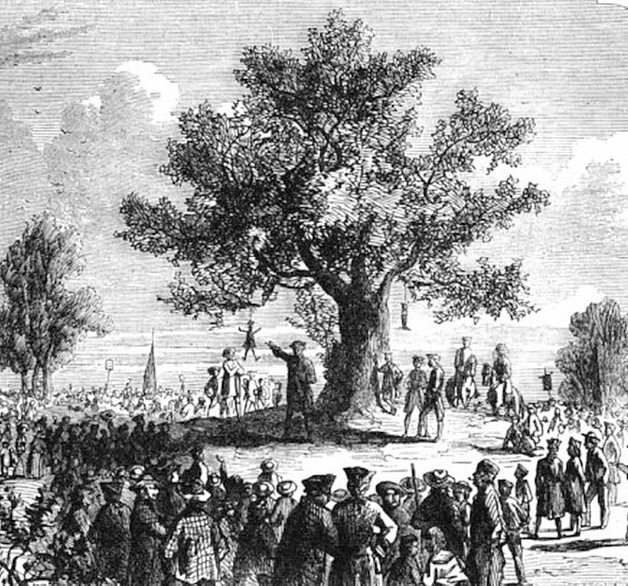
The Boston Committee of Correspondence, which usually gathered at the Liberty Tree in Boston Common

The committees of correspondence were a collection of American political organizations that sought to coordinate opposition to the British Parliament and, later, support for American independence during the American Revolution. The brainchild of Samuel Adams, a Patriot from Boston, the committees sought to establish, through the writing of letters, an underground network of communication among Patriot leaders in the Thirteen Colonies. The committees were instrumental in setting up the First Continental Congress, which convened in Philadelphia in September and October 1774.

== Function ==
The function of the committees was to alert the residents of a given colony of the actions taken by the British Crown, and to disseminate information from cities to the countryside. The news was typically spread via hand-written letters or printed pamphlets, which would be carried by couriers on horseback or aboard ships. The committees were responsible for ensuring that this news accurately reflected the views of Patriots, and was dispatched to the proper receiving groups. Many correspondents were members of colonial legislative assemblies, and others were also active in the Sons of Liberty and Stamp Act Congress.

A total of about 7,000 to 8,000 Patriots served on these committees at the colonial and local levels, comprising most of the leadership in their communities; Loyalists were naturally excluded. The committees became the leaders of the American resistance to Great Britain, and largely directed the Revolutionary War effort at the state and local level.

The committees promoted patriotism and home manufacturing, advising Americans to avoid luxuries, and lead a more simple life. The committees gradually extended their power over many aspects of American public life. In late 1774 and early 1775, they supervised the elections of provincial conventions, which began the operation of a true colonial government.

== History ==
The first committees of correspondence were established in Boston in 1764 to rally opposition to the Currency Act and unpopular reforms imposed on the customs service.

During the Stamp Act crisis the following year, the Province of New York formed a committee to urge common resistance among its neighbors to the new taxes. The Province of Massachusetts Bay's correspondents responded by urging other colonies to send delegates to the Stamp Act Congress that fall. The resulting committees disbanded after the crisis was over.

After the Boston Massacre skirmish on March 5, 1770, pro-revolutionary Patriot leaders in Boston used the growing hostility toward the harsh British military occupation to justify the need for a more ongoing approach. The Massachusetts colonists established the first long-standing committee with the approval of a town meeting in October of 1772.

By spring 1773, other colonies had decided to follow the Massachusetts system and began to set up their own committees. The Colony of Virginia appointed an eleven-member committee in March, quickly followed by the colonies of Rhode Island, Connecticut, the Province of New Hampshire, and the Province of South Carolina. By February 1774, 11 colonies had set up their own committees; of the thirteen colonies that eventually rebelled, only the provinces of North Carolina and Pennsylvania did not.

=== Delaware ===
In Delaware Colony, a committee of correspondence was established by Thomas McKean after ten years of agitation centered in New Castle County. In neighboring Kent County, Caesar Rodney set up a second committee, followed by Sussex County. Following the recommendation of the First Continental Congress in 1774, the committees were replaced by elected "committees of inspection" with a subcommittee of correspondence. The new committees specialized in intelligence work, especially the identification of men opposed to the Patriot cause. The committees were a driving force in popularizing the demand for independence.

The correspondence committees exchanged information with others in Boston, Philadelphia, and elsewhere. Their leadership was often drawn upon to provide Delaware with executive leaders. The committees of inspection used publicity as weapons to suppress disaffection and encourage patriotism. With imports from Britain cut off, the committees sought to make America self-sufficient, so they encouraged the cultivation of flax and the raising of sheep for wool. The committees helped organize local militia in the hundreds and later in the counties and all of Delaware. With their encouragement, the Delaware Assembly elected delegates to Continental Congress favorable to independence.

=== Georgia ===
The Georgia provincial settlement was established by a colonial charter awarded by George II of Great Britain on April 21, 1732. The Georgia provincial colony distinguished as a garrison province — Buffer State — secured the thirteen colonies as an omission of Spanish Florida. The 1732 Colony Charter of Georgia was a distinctive contract of authority and governing privileges scripting a trustee governance known as Trustee Georgia which was differentiated from the preliminary British America charters as Proprietary charters and Royal charters.

On February 8, 1733, the Trustees for the Establishment of the Colony of Georgia in America assembled the first Committee of Correspondence for reviewing the draught of letters to the board of trustees, meeting of Georgia trustees, and summoning the trustees Common Council. The Georgia General Assembly passed an ordinance appointing William Knox as a colonial agent for soliciting and transactions with Great Britain on February 19, 1762. Georgia colonial agent William Knox was discharged as the province parliamentary representative in November 1765 for his concession of the Stamp Act.

The Georgia Commons House of Assembly deliberated considerations of Charles Garth being competently suitable for sustaining the Georgia Esquire Agent role in place of William Knox. On March 15, 1768, Georgia Commons House declared an ordinance nominating Benjamin Franklin to solicit the affairs of the Georgia Province with Great Britain. After the Georgia Commons House referendum, Franklin was appointed as the Esquire Agent for the Province of Georgia on April 11, 1768. Franklin represented the colony of Georgia in the Parliament of Great Britain tenaciously yielding the rectitude until 1774 at the threshold of the American Revolution.

=== Massachusetts ===
In November 1772 in the Province of Massachusetts Bay, Samuel Adams, Joseph Warren, and Mercy Otis Warren formed a committee in response to the Gaspée Affair and to the recent British decision to have the salaries of the royal governor and judges be paid by the British Crown rather than the colonial assembly, a measure which effectively stripped the colony of its means of holding public officials accountable to their constituents.

In the following months, more than one hundred other committees were formed in towns and villages throughout Massachusetts. The Massachusetts committee's headquarters, based in Boston and led by Adams, became a model for other Patriot groups. The meeting establishing the committee set its purpose, outlining "the rights of the colonists, and of this province in particular, as men, as Christians, and as subjects; to communicate and publish the same to the several towns in this province and to the world as the sense of this town."

=== Maryland ===
The Province of Maryland became the eighth of the thirteen colonies to appoint a committee of correspondence on October 15, 1773. The Maryland committee stated that there was an "absolute necessity of a general and firm union of sister colonies to preserve common liberties", and called for a meeting of this union to be held in Philadelphia.

=== New Jersey ===
New Jersey formed a Committee of Correspondence on February 8, 1774. The New Jersey Committee of Correspondence consisted of a nine-member panel and met in New Brunswick, New Jersey on May 31, 1774 to respond to the emergency message of the Boston Committee of Correspondence regarding the Port Act.

=== New York ===
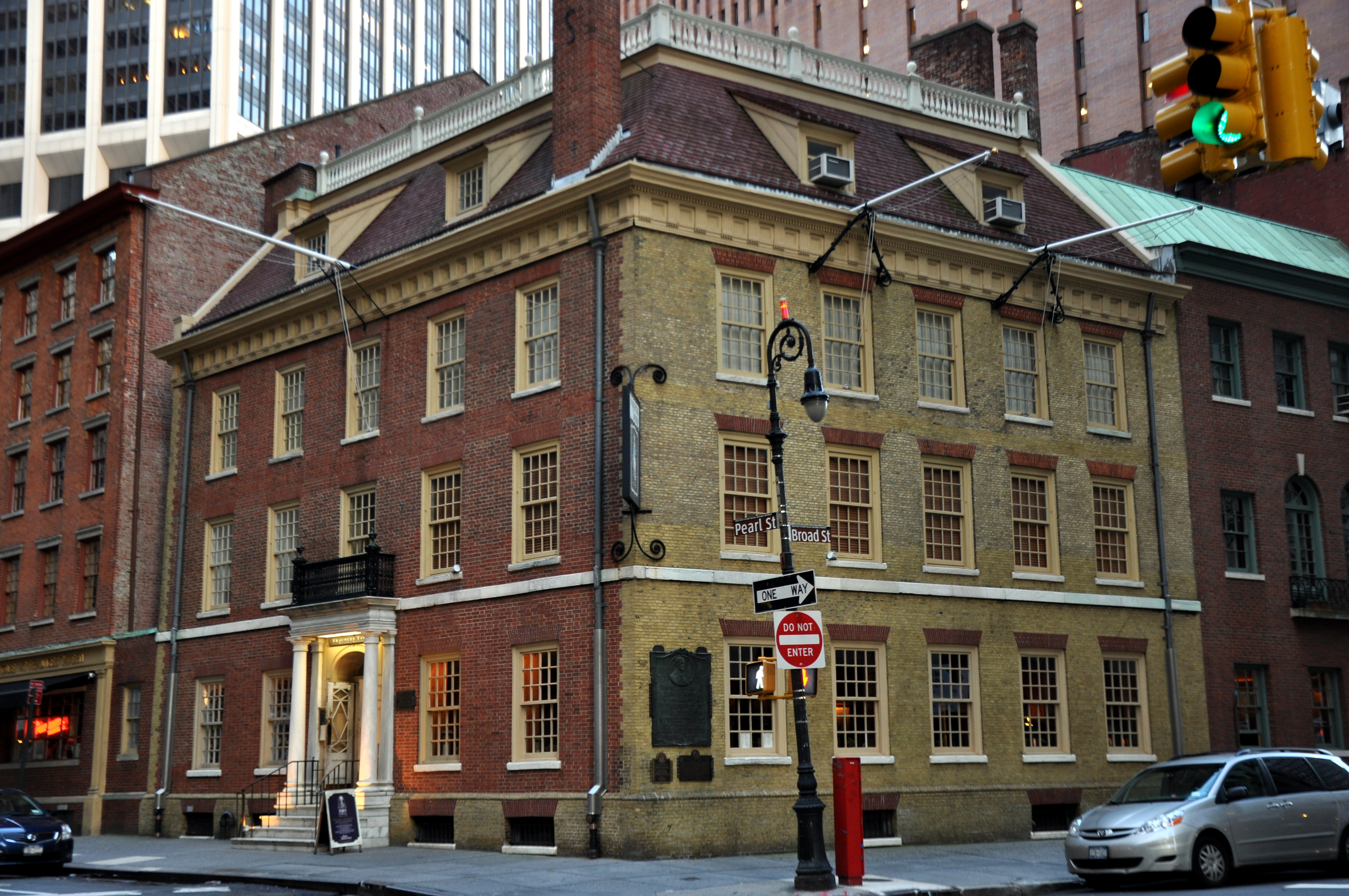
Fraunces Tavern in Lower Manhattan, the meeting place of the Committee of Fifty on May 16, 1774

On January 20, 1774, New York formed their Committee of Correspondence.

In response to the news that the Port of Boston would be closed under the Boston Port Act, an advertisement was posted at the coffee house on Wall Street in New York City, a noted place of resort for shipmasters and merchants, inviting merchants to meet on May 16, 1774, at the Fraunces Tavern "in order to consult on measures proper to be pursued on the present critical and important situation." At the meeting, chaired by Isaac Low, the committee resolved to nominate a 50-member committee of correspondence to be submitted to the public. On May 17, 1774, they published a notice calling on the public to meet at the coffee house on May 19 at 1 p.m. to approve the committee and appoint others as they may see fit. At the meeting on May 19, Francis Lewis was also nominated and the entire Committee of Fifty-one was confirmed.

On May 23, 1774, the committee met at the coffee house and appointed Isaac Low as permanent chairman and John Alsop as deputy chairman. The committee then formed a subcommittee, which produced a letter in response to the letters from Boston, calling for a "Congress of Deputies from the Colonies" to be assembled, which became known as the First Continental Congress and was approved by the committee.

On May 30, 1774, the Committee formed a subcommittee to write a letter to the supervisors of New York's counties to exhort them to also form similar committees of correspondence, which was adopted in a meeting of the Committee on May 31.

On July 4, 1774, a resolution was approved to appoint five delegates contingent upon their confirmation by the freeholders of the City and County of New York, and to request that the other counties also send delegates. Isaac Low, John Alsop, James Duane, Philip Livingston, and John Jay were then appointed, and the public of the City and County was invited to attend City Hall and approve the appointments on July 7. This caused friction with the more radical Sons of Liberty, known as the Committee of Mechanics faction, who held a meeting in the fields on July 6. Three counties, Westchester, Duchess, and Albany acquiesced to the five delegates, while three counties, Kings, Suffolk, and Orange, sent delegates of their own.

=== North Carolina ===
By 1773, the political situation had deteriorated. There was concern about the courts. Massachusetts' young and ardent Boston patriot, Josiah Quincy Jr., visited North Carolina for five days. He spent the night of March 26, 1773, at Cornelius Harnett's home near Wilmington, North Carolina. The two discussed and drew up plans for a Committee of Correspondence. The committee's purpose: communicate circumstances and revolutionary sentiment among the colonies. It was after this meeting that Quincy dubbed Harnett the "Samuel Adams of North Carolina."

In December 1773, the North Carolina Committee of Correspondence formed in Wilmington. Although Harnett was absent, he was made chairman of the committee. Other members included John Harvey, Robert Howe, Richard Caswell, Edward Vail, John Ashe, Joseph Hewes, Samuel Johnston, and William Hooper.

=== Pennsylvania ===
Pennsylvania Assembly deliberated the purposes of the colony committee of correspondence in 1764 to 1765. The Royal Crown endowing progressive parliamentary taxation decrees with the thirteen colonies — No taxation without representation — prompt the Pennsylvania Assembly to convene a disclosure committee. The committee was voted upon appointing Joseph Galloway, Giles Knight, Thomas Livezey, Isaac Pearson, and Joseph Richardson as a joint colonial agent conveying the internal proceedings of British America. The correspondence committee was officially agreed upon by the Pennsylvania Assembly on October 16, 1765.

In December 1773, the Boston colonists orchestrated an act of political dissent at Boston's Dock Square specifically as the establishment of the Green Dragon Tavern frequented by proclaimed prerevolutionary Patriots.

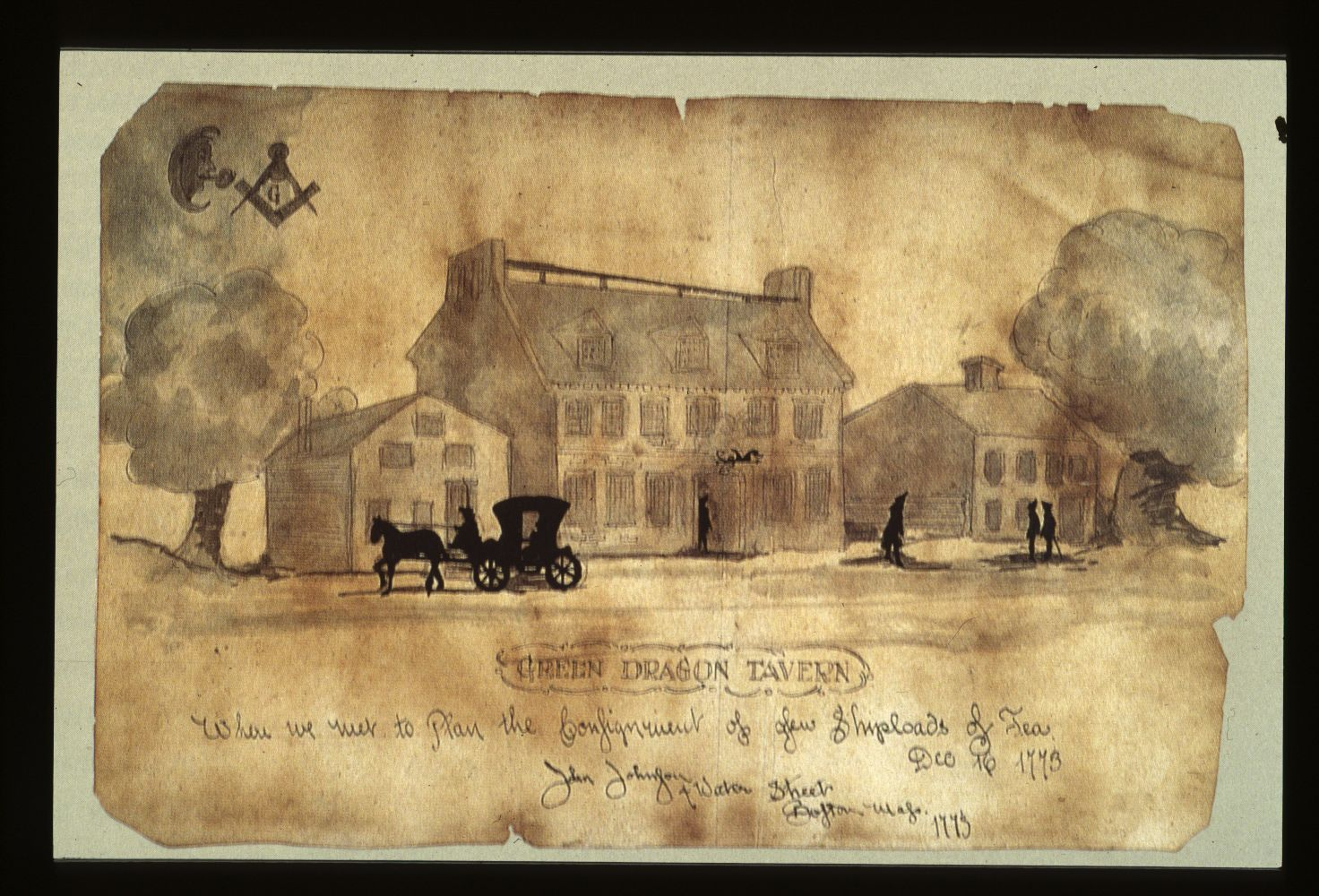
Where we met for consignment of tea

The Boston Caucus developed a pungence of the duties pressed by the Parliament of Great Britain with regards to British imports or merchant trade. The obscure conspirators commandeering the maritime property of East India Company who perceived by Isaac Barré termed the assailants as Sons of Liberty valiantly substantiating Parliamentary opposition as consequential declaration at Boston Harbor in December of 1773. The Tea Act of 1773 coerced the Boston Harbor insurrection reciprocating the Parliament of Great Britain to impose authoritarian hardship reforms through British absolutism endured by the Massachusetts colonists. The autocracy proceedings surmised as grievances and retaliatory resolutions emerged as the Intolerable Acts often referred to as the Coercive Acts or Punitive Acts.

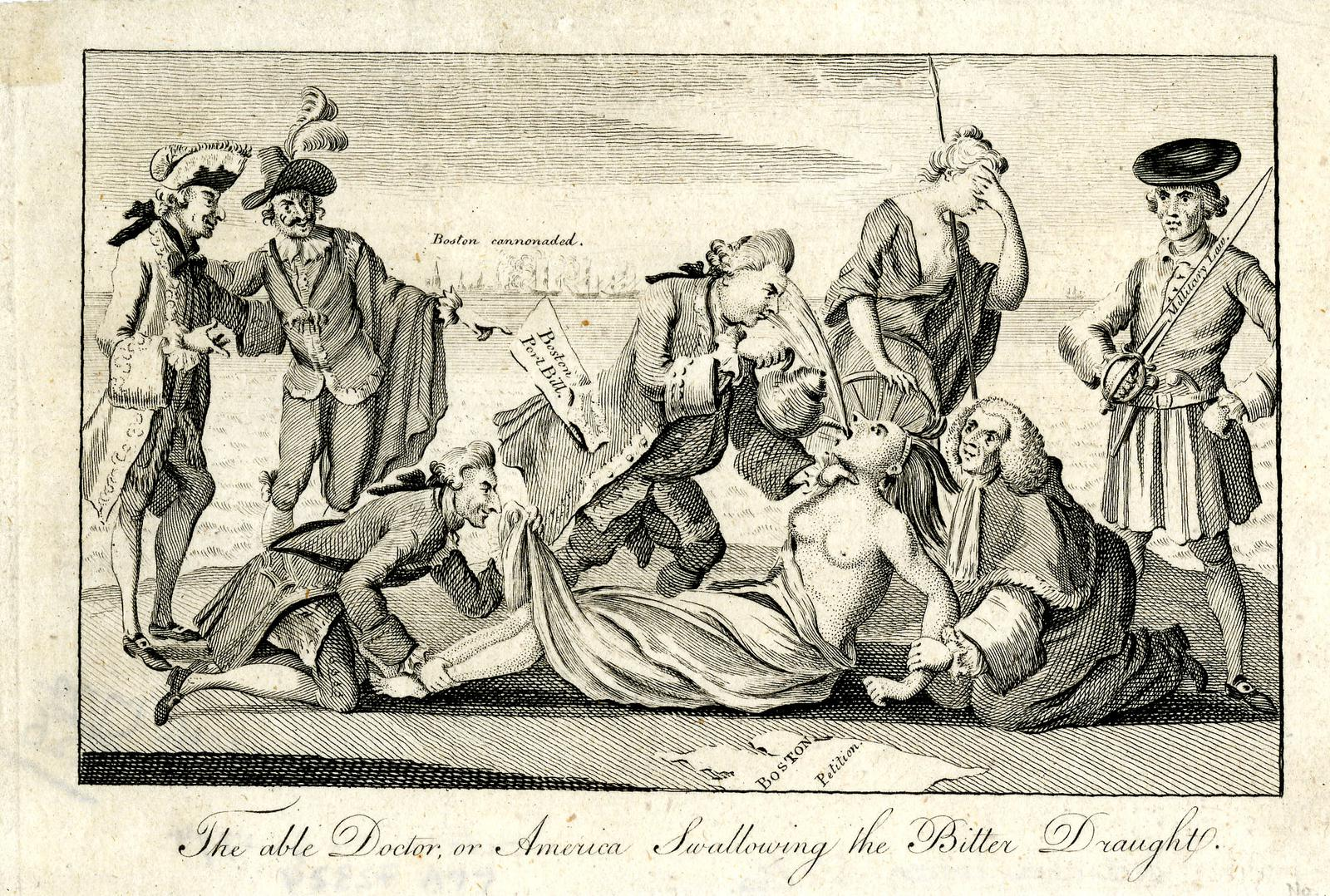
The Able Doctor

On May 20, 1774, the Province of Pennsylvania convened a multicolonial meeting at City Tavern in Philadelphia to deliberate the taxation proceedings of the Parliament of Great Britain. The Boston Harbor closure sanctioned by the Boston Port Act of 1774 was densely fathomed by the British America colonists at the prerevolutionary tête-à-tête.

In May 1774, Paul Revere delivered a circular letter — Massachusetts Circular Letter — from the Boston Committee of Correspondence petitioning the boycott of maritime imports from Great Britain. The Boston Committee of Correspondence letter arrived prior to the May 20, 1774 colonial meeting in Philadelphia, Pennsylvania with an attendance of two hundred British America colonists.

Among the last to form a committee of correspondence, the Province of Pennsylvania did so at the meeting in Philadelphia on May 20, 1774. In a compromise between the more radical and more conservative factions of political activists, the committee was formed by combining the lists each faction proposed. That committee of 19 diversified and grew to 43, then to 66, and finally to two different groups of 100 between May 1774 and its dissolution in September 1776. Ultimately, 160 men from Pennsylvania participated in one or more of the committees, though only four were regularly elected to all of them: Thomas Barclay, John Cox Jr., John Dickinson, and Joseph Reed.

=== South Carolina ===
In the seventeenth century, South Carolina colony was granted Carolina Charter of 1663 vested by King Charles II on March 24, 1663. The royal charter established the Southern Colonies territory as a proprietary colony governed by a lord proprietor who served primarily with distinction as a royalist.

By 1717, the Carolina Charter Colonists acquired a dissatisfaction with the absolute lords and proprietors governing the colonial province bidding the General Assembly to enact the Carolina Charter Conscription Act of 1717. In the early eighteenth century, the South Carolina colonists contrived a militia resolution to abolish the proprietary rule beseeching a crown colony for an ordained rule of governance. The southern province insurrection incited by Arthur Middleton subsequently became known as the Revolution of 1719 in the colony of South Carolina.

In 1721, the southern colony General Assembly enacted an ordinance endorsed by James Moore Jr. to establish a Committee of Correspondence. The disclosure committee would cultivate an acquaintance with the thirteen colonies and the Carolina's civil and provincial dilemmas. The ordinance declaration would necessitate a printing press for the dissemination of pamphlets as authorized by Francis Nicholson on September 21, 1721. During the American Revolution, the Carolina correspondence committee served as the principal authorship for information exchange throughout the English colonies and province of South Carolina.

In 1732, Thomas Whitmarsh published the first issue of the South Carolina Gazette on January 8, 1732. The Carolina Gazette publication satisfactorily commemorated the civil responsibilities and enlightenment regarding colonial governance and constitutional information during the Georgian era.

=== Virginia ===
In early March 1773, Dabney Carr proposed the formation of a permanent Committee of Correspondence before the Virginia House of Burgesses. Virginia's own committee was formed on March 12, 1773. Its members were Peyton Randolph, Robert Carter Nicholas, Richard Bland, Richard Henry Lee, Benjamin Harrison, Edmund Pendleton, Patrick Henry, Dudley Digges, Dabney Carr, Archibald Cary, and Thomas Jefferson.

=== Other colonies ===
By July 1773, Rhode Island, Connecticut, and New Hampshire had also formed committees.

With Pennsylvania's action in May 1774, all of the colonies that eventually rebelled had established such committees.

The colonial committees successfully organized common resistance to the Tea Act and even recruited physicians who would write that drinking tea would make Americans "weak, effeminate, and valetudinarian for life."

These permanent committees performed the important planning necessary for the First Continental Congress, which convened in September 1774. The Second Congress created its own committee of correspondence to communicate the American interpretation of events to foreign nations.

These committees were replaced during the revolution with Provincial Congresses.

By 1780, committees of correspondence had also been formed in Great Britain and Ireland.

== See also ==
- Committee of Safety (American Revolution)
- Founding Fathers of the United States
- Museum of the American Revolution

== Historical documents archive ==
- "Georgia Assembly Committee of Correspondence Archive Documents". Founders Online. The Papers of Benjamin Franklin. U.S. National Archives and Records Administration.
- "Pennsylvania Assembly Committee of Correspondence Archive Documents". Founders Online. The Papers of Benjamin Franklin. U.S. National Archives and Records Administration.
- "The votes and proceedings of the freeholders and other inhabitants of the town of Boston, in town meeting assembled, according to law". Princeton University Library ~ The Sid Lapidus, '59 Collection on Liberty and the American Revolution. Boston, Massachusetts: Edes and Gill, and T. and J. Fleet. 1772. JSTOR community.34336959. LCCN 08021120. OCLC 6273351.
- "New York Committee of Correspondence to the Committee of Correspondence, Boston, 23 May 1774". Founders Online ~ National Historical Publications and Records Commission. Papers of John Jay, Vol. 1, 1760–1779. United States National Archives and Records.
- "Proceedings of the Committee of Correspondence, July 19, 1774" [Ten resolutions concerning Britain Royal Crown mockery of Colonial America constitution and Liberties of America]. Library of Congress Online Catalog ~ Book / Printed Material. United States Library of Congress. LCCN 2020768579. OCLC 1204266960.
- "John Adams to the Boston Committee of Correspondence, September 1774". Founders Online ~ National Historical Publications and Records Commission. Papers of John Adams, Vol. 2, December 1773 - April 1775. United States National Archives and Records.
