= 1708 in science =

The year 1708 in science and technology involved some significant events.

== Physiology and medicine ==
- Herman Boerhaave publishes Institutiones medicae, one of the earliest textbooks on physiology.

== Technology ==
- Calcareous hard-paste porcelain is produced at Dresden in Saxony by Ehrenfried Walther von Tschirnhaus and developed after his death (October) by Johann Friedrich Böttger.

== Births ==
- January 30 – Georg Dionysius Ehret, German artist, botanist and entomologist (died 1770)
- October 8 – Jean-Rodolphe Perronet, French bridge engineer (died 1794)
- October 16 – Albrecht von Haller, Swiss physician and scientist, founder of neurology (died 1777)
- October 22 – Frederic Louis Norden, Danish explorer (died 1742)
- John Lining, Scottish-American botanist and physician (died 1760)

== Deaths ==
- August 1 – Edward Tyson, English comparative anatomist (born 1651)
- October 10 – David Gregory, Scottish astronomer (born 1659)
- October 11 – Ehrenfried Walter von Tschirnhaus, German mathematician (born 1651)
- December 5 – Seki Takakazu, Japanese mathematician (born c. 1642)
- December 28 – Joseph Pitton de Tournefort, French botanist (born 1656)
