= Peter Timothy =

American politician

- Born: 1724
- Died: 1782 (aged 57–58); Atlantic Ocean
- Spouse: Ann Donovan (m. 1745)
- Children: between 12 and 15
- Parent: Lewis Timothy

Peter Timothy (1724 – 1782), originally named Peter Timothee, was an 18th-century Dutch-American printer and politician. He immigrated to the American colonies with his parents, French Huguenots, Lewis and Elizabeth Timothy. Lewis worked for Benjamin Franklin and learned the trade in Philadelphia before moving to Charleston, South Carolina (called Charles Town before the American Revolutionary War. His parents ran the South Carolina Gazette, which was turned over to Timothy after his father's death, his mother's period of operating the printing business, and after he became of age. In addition to running the newspaper, Timothy, ran a printing business, was postmaster, and politician. He was particularly active in the period leading up to and during the war. A notable event was his publication of the Declaration of Independence for public viewing, which included his name as printer. Afraid that his printing press would be damaged or confiscated, there were periods of time, such as during the Siege of Charleston when he had suspended publishing. He was taken prisoner as a traitor and held for ten months at the alligator-protected prison at St. Augustine, Florida. He died during an ocean voyage, after which is wife Ann Timothy took over the printing business.

== Personal life ==
He was probably born in the Netherlands in 1724 to a French Huguenot father, Lewis Timothy (originally Louis Timothee), and a Dutch mother, Elizabeth (originally Elisabet Timothee). Lewis was a printer, librarian, and linguist fluent in Dutch, German, French, and English. Elizabeth was adept at business and accounting.

Peter married Ann Donovan on December 8, 1745 in Charleston. Ann and Peter were believed to have had at least twelve and as many as fifteen children, seven of whom died as infants. Their children include Elizabeth–Ann and Frances–Claudia, who were on their own or married by 1780. The remaining children at that time were Anne, Sarah, Robert, Sarah, and Benjamin Franklin. He held a pew in St. Philip's Church. Timothy owned land in Berkeley and Orangeburg counties of South Carolina.

== Family printers ==
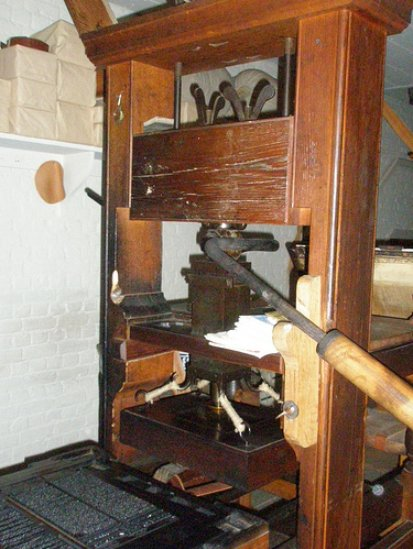
Typical printing press of the 18th century

The family first immigrated to Colonial Pennsylvania in 1731 to work for Benjamin Franklin in Philadelphia. The following year, Franklin sent them to Charleston, South Carolina, where they operated the South Carolina Gazette. (Note: In 1732, Benjamin Franklin sent the young couple to Charleston, South Carolina (then called Charles Town), to replace the dead printer, Eleazar Phillips, who was a business associate of Franklin. Louis Timothee anglicized his name to Lewis Timothy and took over printing of the South Carolina Gazette after Thomas Whitmarsh, Eleazar Phillips' junior partner, had died.) Six years later, Lewis Timothy died, leaving the press to his widow and 14-year-old son Peter (who had learned how to use the press). Elizabeth Timothy ran the business until Peter took over in 1746.

== Printing and political career ==
Beginning in 1746, Peter Timothy ran the South Carolina Gazette, which became "South Carolina's best-known and most enduring eighteenth-century newspaper."

He became increasingly interested in South Carolina politics and was elected by St. Peter's Parish to the Twentieth Royal Assembly from 1751 to 1754. He was elected to the South Carolina's Commons House of Assembly for a term in 1755 (rare for an artisan).

Until 1758, Timothy held a monopoly of printing services in South Carolina. He was the official printer for the state's Commons House of Assembly. In 1756, he became Charleston's postmaster general. He became the deputy postmaster of the southern colonies during the Stamp Act Crisis of 1765. The next year, he became the acting postmaster of the district. A patriot, during the events leading up to the American Revolution, he published political opinions, such as condemnation of the British governments actions during the Boston Massacre. He became increasingly interested in the concept of the freedom of the press and began to print radical tracts in his columns and letters to the editor.

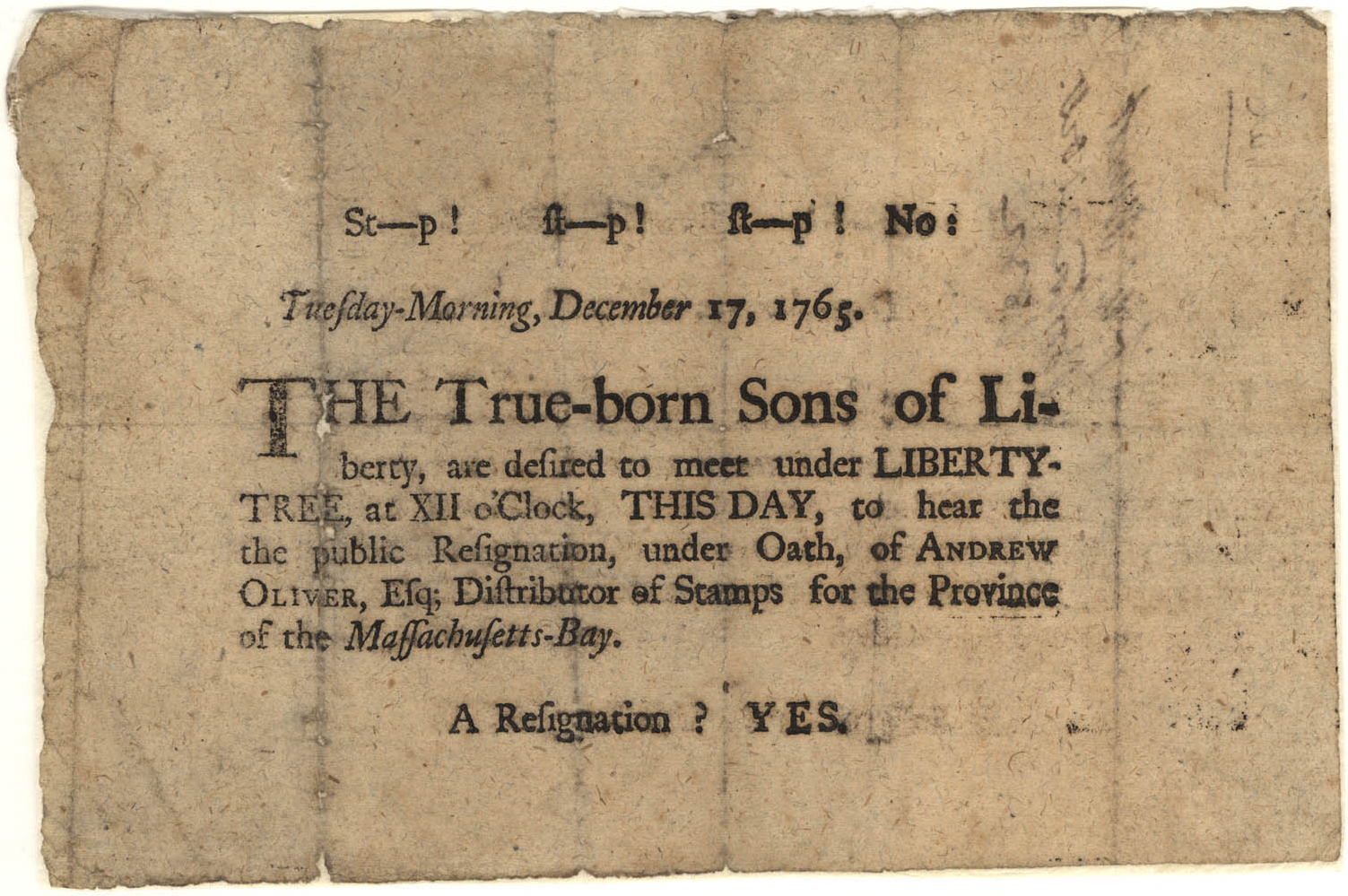
Sons of Liberty broadside. "Tuesday-Morning, December 17, 1765. The True-born Sons of Liberty, are desired to meet under LIBERTY-TREE, at XII o'Clock, THIS DAY, to hear the public Resignation, under Oath, of Andrew Oliver, Esq; Distributor of Stamps for the Province of the Massachusetts-Bay. A Resignation? Yes."

He became an active member of the Sons of Liberty and the South Carolina Committee of Correspondence, clerk of Council of Safety, and Committee of Observation. He served on Charleston's Committee of Ninety-Nine, which became the state's de facto government. In 1775 to 1776, he served in the First and Second Congressional Congresses, representing St. Michael's and St. Peter's Parishes. He was elected as the clerk of the First General Assembly in 1776. He was a founding member of the Charleston Library Society and was a member of the South Carolina Society and secretary of the Grand Lodge of Free Masons.

External image
- Declaration of Independence, printed in Charleston in 1776 by Peter Timothy (Gilder Lehrman Institute, GLC000959)

Tensions grew in the colonies against the rule of King George III and the desire for the American colonies achieve independence. Fearing that British soldiers would take or destroy his printing press, Timothy stopped publishing the South Carolina Gazette newspaper. After the Declaration of Independence was signed in 1776, Timothy began to print broadside copies of the Declaration which were then hung in public places. To show his support, but also to identify himself as a revolutionary, Timothy took the singular step by colonial printers of signing his name (“CHARLES-TOWN, Printed by PETER TIMOTHY”) at the bottom of the document.

== Siege of Charleston ==
Timothy was a military observer who was stationed at the St. Michael's Church steeple to identify of the arrival of the British fleet at the start of the Siege of Charleston on March 29, 1780. (Note: A ten-page report of his military observations on March 26, 1780 are on exhibit at the South Carolina Historical Society Museum entitled "Journal of Observations from 26th March, 1780".) The British maintained their occupation until May 12, 1780. In May 1780, British soldiers were unable to ascertain the loyalty oath from Timothy and captured him and other prominent patriots from Charles Town.

== Prisoner of war and death ==
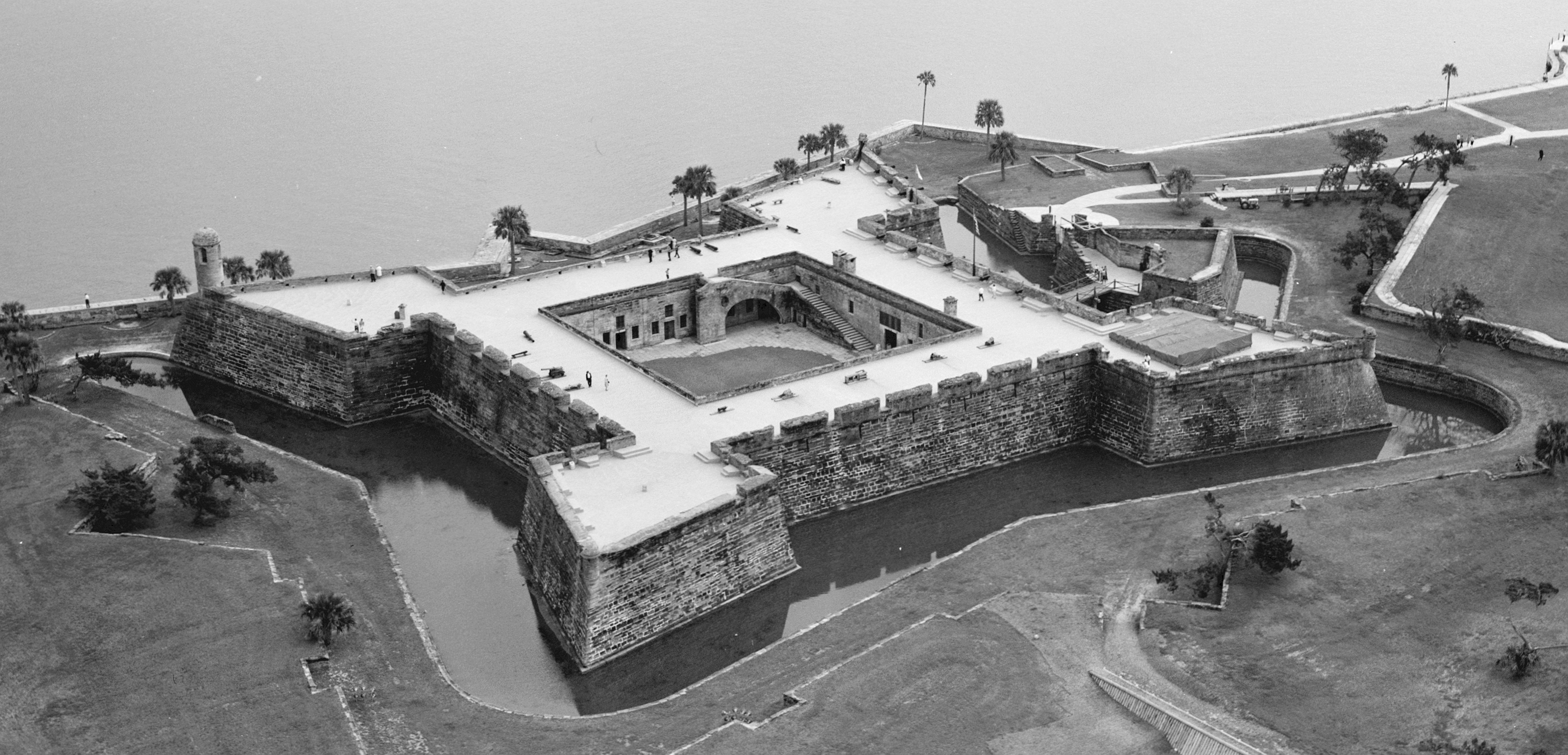
Fort Mark, the name of the complex and prison in St. Augustine, Florida during British occupation. Timothy was held at the prison by the British for 10 months for treason and not agreeing to take the loyalty oath. See also British occupation at Fort Mark

After the British captured Charles Town in 1780, he was identified by the British as a rebel and sent to prison in St. Augustine, Florida. (Note: The prison was on land that was surrounded by alligators. Besides the alligators, escaping prisoners could also subject to death by Native Americans who sided with the British. He stayed at the prison until the end of the war.) After ten months, he was furloughed to stay with family members in Philadelphia, as long as he did not return to Charles Town. (Note: For further on prisoners in the revolution, see Carl Borick, Relieve Us of this Burden: American Prisoners of War in the Revolutionary South, 1780–1782 (Columbia, SC: University of South Carolina Press, 2012).) (Note: Gilder Lehman states that he was able to return to Charles Town.) During the war, he lost all of his savings and he planned for a "get rich quick scheme". In the fall of 1782, he sailed with his family with the goal of reaching Antigua, in the West Indies. However, his ship sank and all on board died. He left his estate to Ann, and three of his children: Sarah (an unmarried daughter), Robert (disabled), and Benjamin Franklin Timothy.

Isaiah Thomas, a former printer who knew Peter Timothy in Charleston (and later a historian of early newspapers in America), wrote regarding Timothy that he was a "much respected citizen" and a "decided and active friend of his country."
