= 1760 in science =

The year 1760 in science and technology involved some significant events.

== Chemistry ==
- Louis Claude Cadet de Gassicourt investigates inks based on cobalt salts and isolates cacodyl from cobalt mineral containing arsenic, pioneering work in organometallic chemistry.

== Geology ==
- John Michell suggests earthquakes are caused by one layer of rocks rubbing against another.

== Medicine ==
- April 30 – Swiss mathematician Daniel Bernoulli presents a paper at the French Academy of Sciences in Paris in which "a mathematical model was used for the first time to study the population dynamics of infectious disease."
- Samuel-Auguste Tissot publishes L'Onanisme in Lausanne, a treatise on the supposed ill-effects of masturbation.

== Physics ==
- Johann Heinrich Lambert publishes Photometria, a pioneering work in photometry, including a formulation of the Beer–Lambert law on light absorption and the introduction of the albedo as a reflection coefficient.

== Technology ==
- Liègeois mechanician John Joseph Merlin first experiments with roller skates in London.

== Events ==
- Mathematician Leonhard Euler begins writing his Letters to a German Princess (Lettres à une princesse d'Allemagne sur divers sujets de physique et de philosophie) to Friederike Charlotte of Brandenburg-Schwedt and her younger sister Louise.

== Awards ==
- Copley Medal: Benjamin Wilson

== Births ==
- April 13 – Thomas Beddoes, reforming English physician (died 1808)
- June 5 – Johan Gadolin, Finnish chemist and mineralogist (died 1852)
- October 23 – Hanaoka Seishū, Japanese surgeon (died 1835)
- Clelia Durazzo Grimaldi, Italian botanist (died 1830)

== Deaths ==
- September 11 – Louis Godin, French astronomer (born 1704)
- September 21 – John Lining, Scottish-American botanist and physician (born 1708)
