= 1659 in science =

The year 1659 in science and technology involved some significant events.

== Astronomy ==
- Christiaan Huygens publishes Systema Saturnium, including the first illustration of the Orion Nebula.

== Mathematics ==
- First known use of the term Abscissa, by Stefano degli Angeli.
- Swiss mathematician Johann Rahn publishes Teutsche Algebra, containing the first printed use of the 'division sign' (÷, a repurposed obelus variant) as a mathematical symbol for division and of the 'therefore sign' (∴).

== Medicine ==
- Thomas Willis publishes De Febribus.

== Physics ==
- Christiaan Huygens derives the formula for centripedal force.

== Births ==
- February 27 – William Sherard, English botanist (died 1728)
- June 3 – David Gregory, Scottish astronomer (died 1708)

== Deaths ==
- October 10 – Abel Tasman, Dutch explorer (born 1603)
