= 1835 in science =

The year 1835 in science and technology involved some significant events, listed below.

== Astronomy ==
- August 5 – First sighting of the return of Comet Halley by Father Dominique Dumouchel, director of the Collegio Romano at the Vatican. It is next seen on August 21 by Friedrich Georg Wilhelm Struve at the Dorpat Observatory. John Herschel had been expected to find the comet first, as he is at the time in South Africa with his 20 ft focal length reflector – at this time the world's largest telescope. He finally observes it in October and watches until it reaches perihelion November 16. It reappears in January 1836, and Herschel will be the last person to observe it in May.
- August 25 – The first of six articles on discoveries of living creatures on the Moon supposedly made by Herschel and a fictitious companion named Dr. Andrew Grant is published in the New York Sun. This incident is now known as the Great Moon Hoax.
- Berlin Observatory opened.
- Caroline Herschel and Mary Somerville become the first women members of the Royal Astronomical Society.

== Biology ==
- January – J. C. Loudon begins publication of Arboretum et Fruticetum Britannicum.
- Cell division is first observed under the microscope by German botanist Hugo von Mohl as he works over green algae Cladophora glomerata.

== Chemistry ==
- Vinyl chloride first produced by Justus von Liebig and his student Henri Victor Regnault.

== Geology ==
- Ordnance Geological Survey founded in Britain, under Henry De la Beche, the world's first national geological survey.
- Roderick Murchison names the Silurian period, and Adam Sedgwick the Cambrian.

== Mathematics ==
- Adolphe Quetelet publishes Sur l'homme et le développement de ses facultés, ou Essai de physique sociale (translated as Treatise on Man), outlining his theory of "social physics" and describing his concept of the "average man" (l'homme moyen) who is characterized by the mean values of measured variables that follow a normal distribution.

== Physics ==
- George Biddell Airy provides the first full explanation of the Airy disk phenomenon.
- Gaspard-Gustave Coriolis examines motion on a spinning surface and deduces the Coriolis effect.
- William Rowan Hamilton states Hamilton's equations of motion.

== Physiology and medicine ==
- Irish physician Robert James Graves first describes symptoms of Graves' disease.
- French physician Pierre Charles Alexandre Louis publishes his book Recherches sur les effets de la saignée dans quelques maladies inflammatoires et sur l'action de l'émétique et des vésicatoires dans la pneumonie in Paris, in which he analyzes case studies to demonstrate that bloodletting is largely ineffective as a treatment.
- Belgian statistician Adolphe Quetelet publishes his books Sur l'homme et le développement de ses facultés, ou Essai de physique sociale, in which he presents his theory of human variance around the average, with human traits being distributed according to a normal curve.

== Technology ==
- August – H. Fox Talbot exposes the world's first known photographic negatives at Lacock Abbey in Wiltshire, England.
- September 12 – A Prussian patent is granted to Wilhelm Friedrich Wieprecht and Carl Moritz for a valved bass tuba.
- Samuel Colt invents the revolver.
- Joseph Henry invents the electric relay.
- Samuel Morse develops the Morse code.

== Awards ==
- Copley Medal: William Snow Harris
- Wollaston Medal: Gideon Mantell

== Births ==
- March 12 – Simon Newcomb (died 1909), Canadian mathematician and astronomer.
- March 14 – Giovanni Schiaparelli (died 1910), Italian astronomer.
- March 24 – Joseph Stefan (died 1893), Austro-Slovene physicist and mathematician.
- March 29 – Gustav Zander (died 1920), Swedish physician.
- August 2 – Elisha Gray (died 1901), American electrical engineer.
- October 1 – Ádám Politzer (died 1920), Hungarian otologist.
- November 6 – Cesare Lombroso (died 1909), Italian forensic psychiatrist.

== Deaths ==
- August 18 – Friedrich Stromeyer (born 1776), German chemist.
- September 14 – John Brinkley (born 1763), British astronomer.
- September 23 – Antide Janvier (born 1751), French precision clockmaker.
- November 21 – Hanaoka Seishū (born 1760), Japanese surgeon.
