= The South-Carolina and American General Gazette =

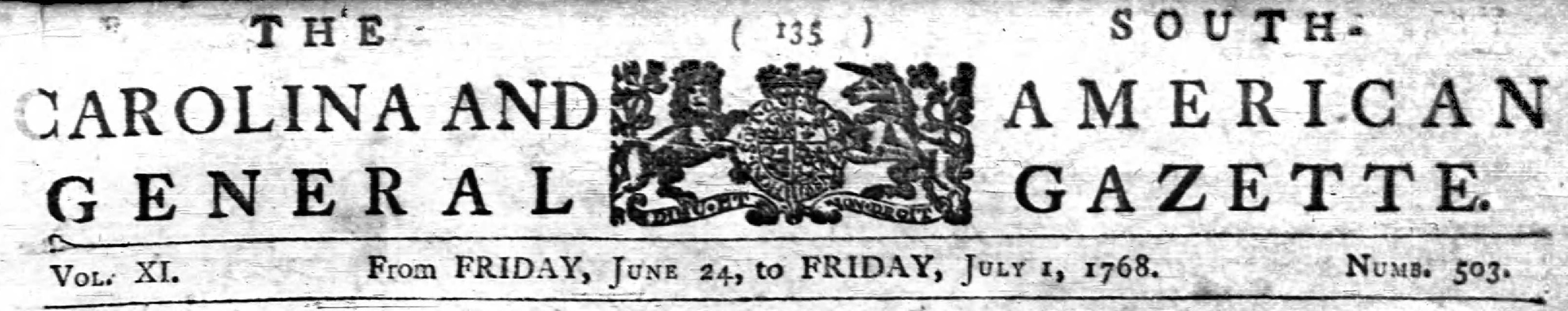
- Type: Weekly newspaper
- Owner(s): Robert Wells, John Wells
- Founded: 1758 (as The South-Carolina Weekly Gazette)
- Ceased publication: 1782 (as The Royal Gazette)
- Political alignment: Loyalist
- Headquarters: Charleston, South Carolina

The South-Carolina and American General Gazette was an 18th-century newspaper published in colonial Charleston, South Carolina.

== History ==
The paper was founded as The South-Carolina Weekly Gazette in 1758 by Robert Wells and G. Bruce, and changed names to The South-Carolina and American General Gazette in 1764. Aside from some periods of suspension during the American Revolutionary War, it published until February 1781. When Charleston and the paper fell under British control, it published under the title The Royal Gazette from March 1781 and into 1782. Wells was a loyalist and left for England in 1775 once war seemed inevitable, and the paper was continued by his son John Wells.

The paper's competition was the South Carolina Gazette (founded 1732) and South-Carolina Gazette and Country Journal (founded 1765), all located in Charleston. Wells' paper was the only one of the three to support the Stamp Act. But it was also the only paper in the state to publish the entirety of the Declaration of Independence in 1776. An original copy of that publication (the August 2–14, 1776 issue) was sold at auction for $140,000 in 2000.

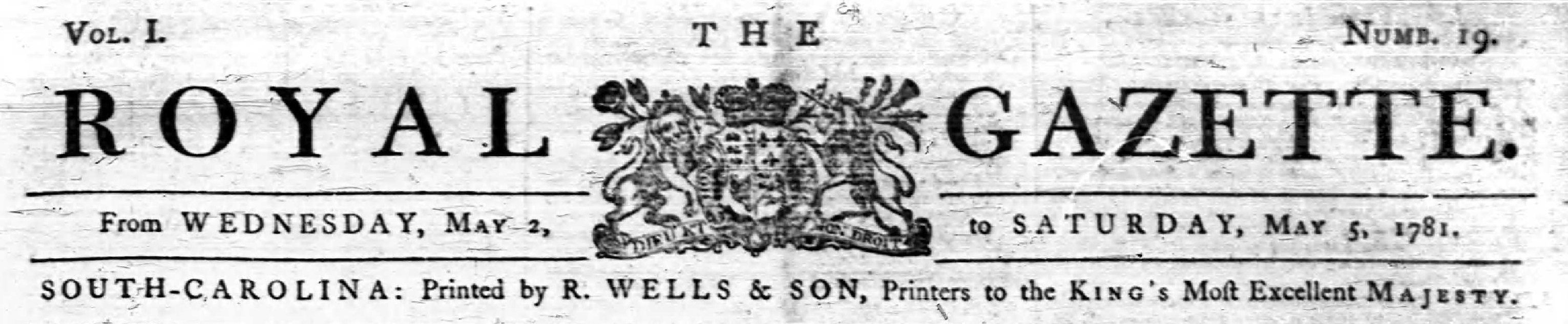
Nameplate of The Royal Gazette, May 1781

When Wells' son John took over the paper in 1775, he moved its political stance to the cause of independence, but primarily as a business decision. He then switched back to a Loyalist view in July 1780. In January 1781, his brother William C. Wells came to town to assist, and to report that under British control, the paper now had received the royal printing business. The paper changed names to The Royal Gazette in March 1781. After the British loss at the Battle of Yorktown, John had to consider switching sides yet again, but decided to leave town with his brother when the British left in December 1782. This marked the end of the newspaper. William returned to England permanently, but John received permission to return to Charleston in 1792.
