= Thomas Whitemarsh =

Thomas Whitemarsh (? - 1733), sometimes spelled as Whitmarsh, was a printer who printed and introduced the first newspaper to the colony of South Carolina on January 8, 1731, called, the South Carolina Gazette. Little is known of Whitemarsh's adolescent life in England. Whitemarsh was a journeyman under Benjamin Franklin, who had, after establishing a partnership with him, sent Whitemarsh to Charlestown in response to a call by the colonial assembly for a printer who was offering £1000 for the effort. Whitemarsh arrived there on September 29, 1730. Franklin had known Whitemarsh while the latter was working in a print shop in London as a compositor and came to Philadelphia and worked for Franklin. The first printing of Whitemarsh's Gazette was issued on January 8, 1732. Whitemarsh died of yellow fever in the summer of 1733 only a couple of years after he had printed the first issue of the Gazette. The South Carolina Gazette was taken over by Louis Timothee who became its proprietor and editor.

Whitemarsh's purchases of printing supplies, books and almanacs were recorded in Franklin's Ledgers A and B (above, p. 172);

== Bibliography ==
- Cook, Elizabeth Christine (1912). Literary influences in colonial newspapers, 1704-1750. New York, Columbia University Press.
- Hudson, Frederic (1873). Journalism in the United States, from 1690 to 1872. New York, Harper & Brothers.
- King, William L. (1872). The newspaper press of Charleston, S.C. : a chronological and biographical history, embracing a period of one hundred and forty years. Charleston, S.C. : E. Perry.
- Korty, Margaret Barton (October 1967). "Franklin's World of Books". The Journal of Library History. 2 (4). University of Texas Press: 271–328. JSTOR 25540067.
- McMurtrie, Douglas (1936). History of America printing / The Story of the Introduction of the Press and of Its History and Influence During the Pioneer Period in Each State of the Union · Volume 2. R.R. Bowker Company. OCLC 1060556328.
- Moore, John Weeks (1886). Moore's Historical, Biographical, and Miscellaneous Gatherings, in the form of disconnected notes relative to printers, printing, publishing, and editing of books, newspapers, magazines. Concord, N.H., Printed by the Republican press association.
- Thomas, Isaiah (1874). The history of printing in America, with a biography of printers. Vol. I. New York, B. Franklin.
- Wroth, Lawrence C. (1938). The Colonial Printer. Portland, Me., The Southworth-Anthoensen press.
