= Broad Street (Charleston, South Carolina) =

Street in Charleston, South Carolina

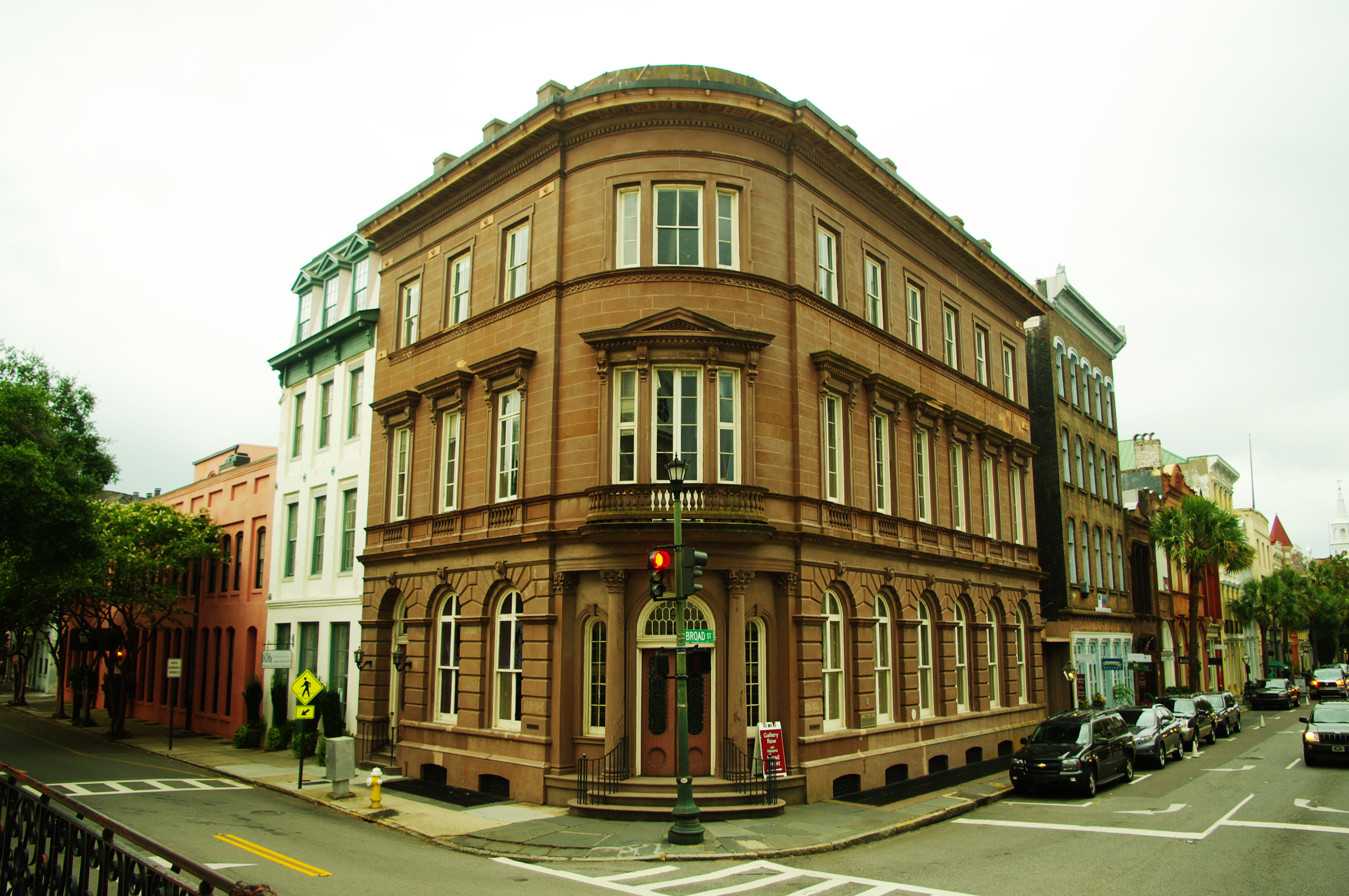
The old State Bank of South Carolina building at 1 Broad Street in Charleston, South Carolina. Completed in 1853, the building began housing local offices for Bankers Trust in 1969.

Broad Street is a street in Charleston, South Carolina. It is known for its wealth of historic resources as well as being on the American Planning Association (APA)'s list of "great streets". Broad Street is characterized by its historic architecture maintained through a history of persistent and scrupulous historic preservation. Broad Street today is a mix of residences, historic buildings, public uses, as well as restaurants and nightlife uses.

== Summary ==
During the 1700s, the eastern portion of Broad Street was occupied solely by merchants and craftsmen until the "Four Corners of Law" (Federal Courthouse and Post Office, the County Courthouse, City Hall, and St. Michael's Episcopal Church) were built on their respective corners of Broad and Meeting Streets. The collection of buildings transformed Charleston into a legal and financial capital. Towards the east, the 1771 Old Exchange and Provost Dungeon terminates Broad at East Bay Street and creates one of the most picturesque and photographed vistas in Charleston.

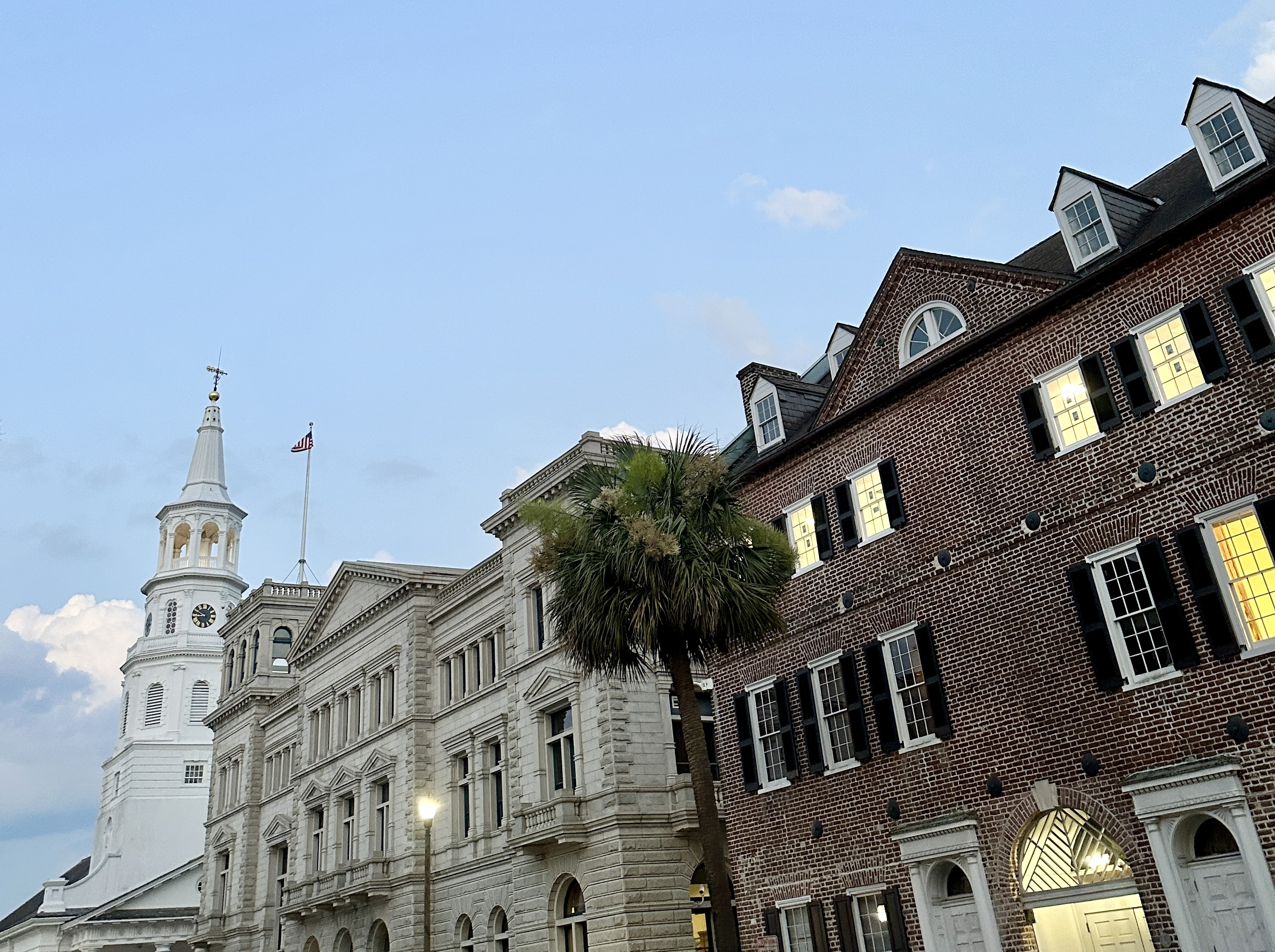
Broad Street in 2023

West of Legare Street, Broad transitions into a residential setting dominated by a live oak tree canopy, late-nineteenth century frame houses with intimate front yards, and the nine-acre Colonial Lake Park at the corner of Rutledge Avenue, which attracts users throughout the day.

Since 1975, under the leadership of Mayor Joseph P. Riley Jr., Charleston has adopted numerous downtown plans to protect and enhance Broad Street's unique character. Bluestone sidewalks, palmetto trees, and gas street lights add to the street's irresistible charm. Broad Street's civic buildings are still used for their public purposes because of the careful planning and preservation efforts that have helped them transition into the 21st century.

== Architectural and planning history ==
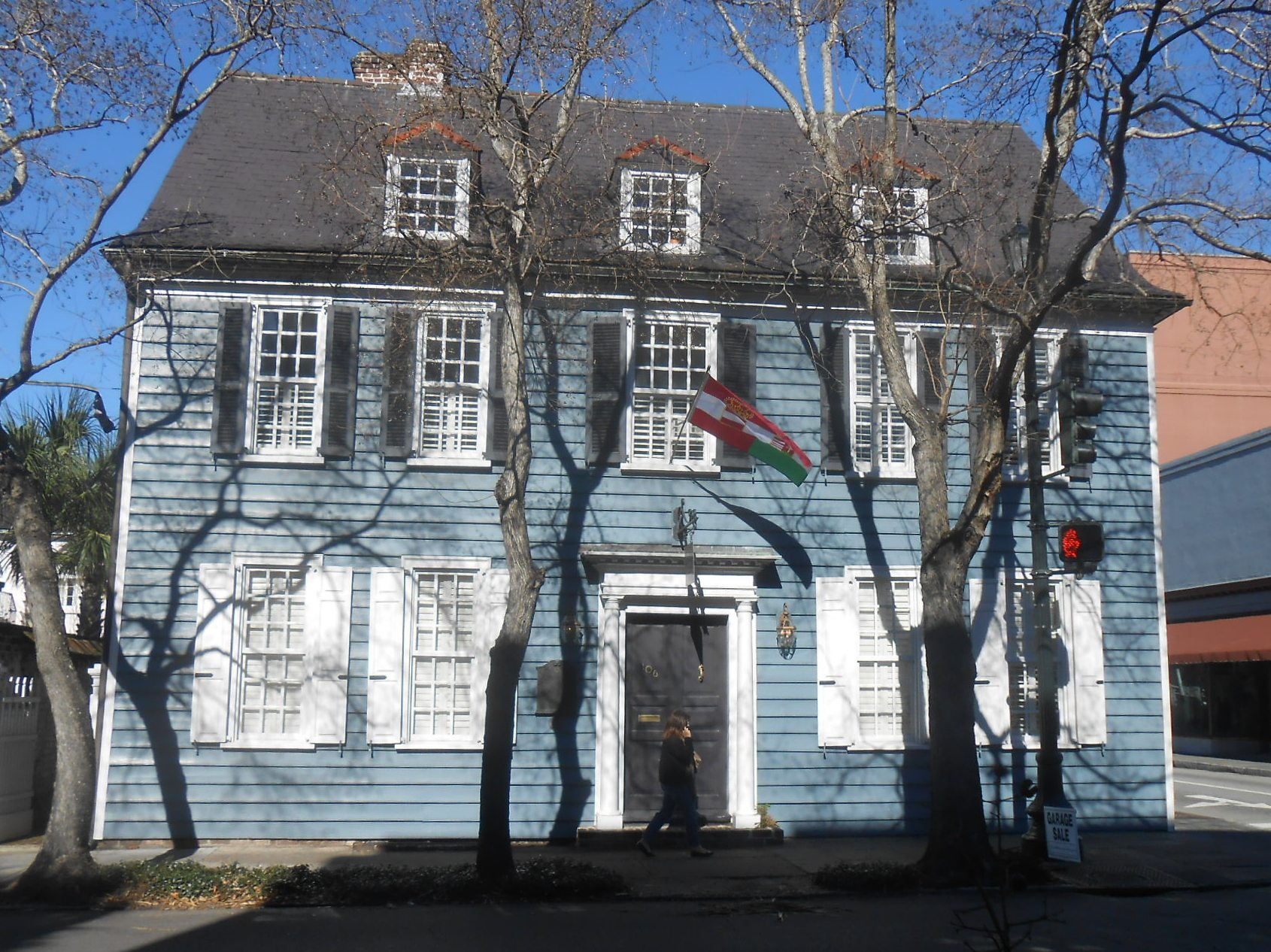
Oldest frame structure in Charleston is constructed at 106 Broad St. (1715)

The Grand Modell of Charleston laid out the streets of the city's peninsula in 1680, including Broad Street as an east-west connector.

Oldest frame structure in Charleston is constructed at 106 Broad St. (1715)

St. Michael's Episcopal Church authorized by Common House of Assembly in 1751

The State House cornerstone laid at the corner of Meeting and Broad Streets in 1756

British siege of Charleston in 1780, destroying many buildings on Broad Street

Wetlands filled in to develop western portion of Broad Street (1792)

Civil War leaves Broad Street in ruins (1865)

Federal Courthouse constructed at the "Four Corners of Law"

Charleston adopts historic district zoning ordinance (1931); proposed by the Society for the Preservation of Old Dwellings (now called Preservation Society of Charleston)

Board of Architectural Review formed (1931); oversees construction in city, along Broad Street

Charleston's Historic Preservation Plan adopted (1974) to preserve the Old and Historic District including Broad Street

Charleston Downtown Plan (1999) successfully guides Broad Street revitalization

New preservation plan, "Vision | Community | Heritage" adopted (2008); 600-plus measures address traffic, housing, cultural preservation throughout city, including Broad Street

== Architecture and preservation ==
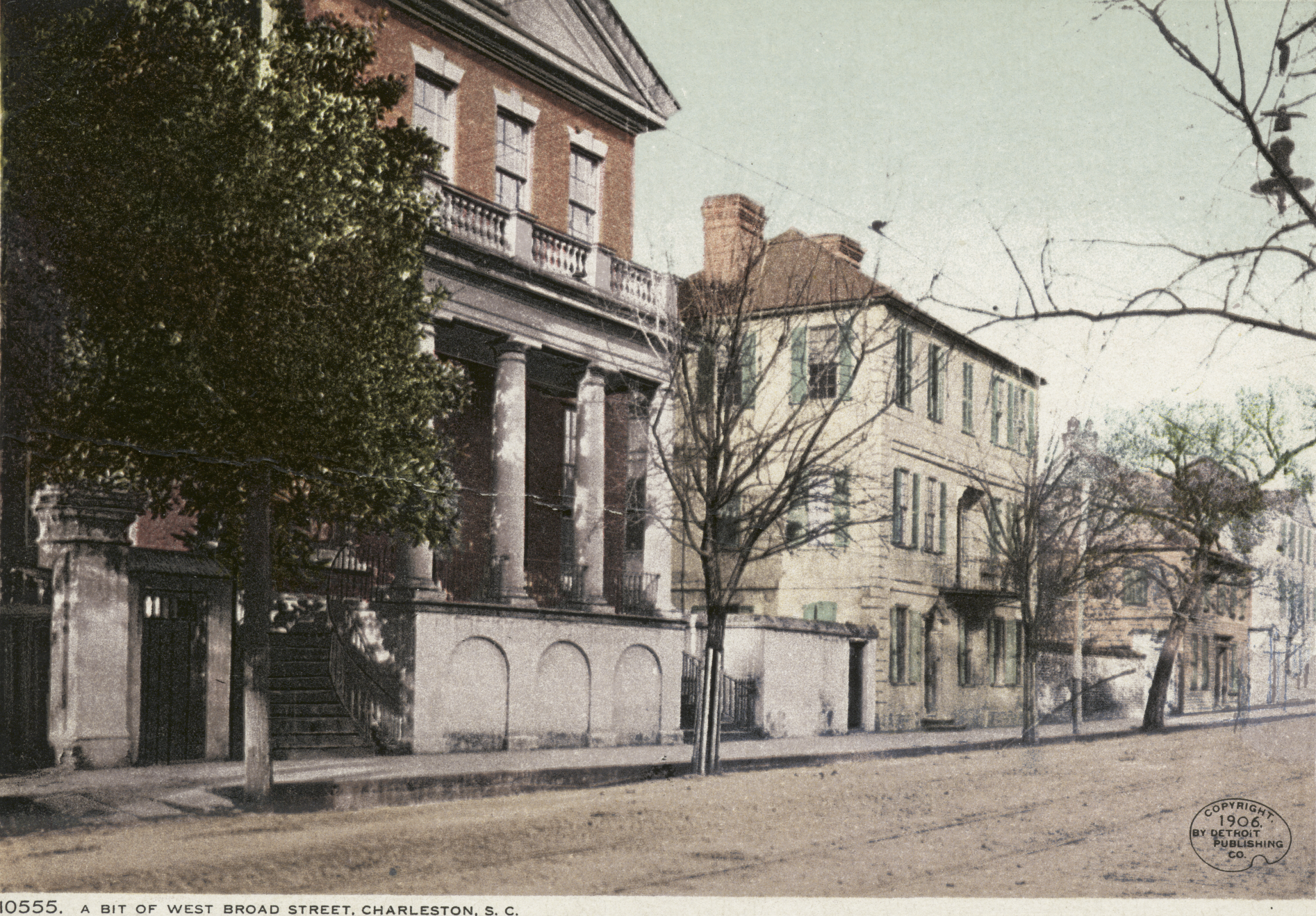
A bit of West Broad Street

Charleston Historic District added to National Register of Historic Places 1966; boundaries increased five times. Broad Street has three individually listed National Register properties and four National Landmark properties

Old Exchange and Provost Dungeon, East Bay and Broad Streets; symmetrical Georgian design, elevated basement, Palladian windows, classical detailing; National Historic Landmark (1969)

Saint Michael's Episcopal Church (Meeting and Broad Streets) built 1761; two-story stucco and brick with 186-foot steeple; oldest church in city; National Historic Landmark (1960)

Governor John Rutledge House (116 Broad St.) built 1763; former home of Governor John Rutledge; renovated 1989 to include 19 guest rooms; National Historic Landmark (1971)

Edward Rutledge House (117 Broad St.) built 1760; house of John Rutledge's younger brother, who also became governor; National Historic Landmark (1971)

South Carolina National Bank of Charleston (16 Broad St.); built 1817 by banker John C. Calhoun, accented with gold leaf eagle; National Register of Historic Places (1973)

Bank of South Carolina (50 Broad St.) built 1798; sold to Library Society 1836, third oldest of its kind in nation; now Charleston city offices; added National Register of Historic Places (1973)

U.S. Post Office and Federal Courthouse (83 Broad St.) 1792; Renaissance Revival design by John Henry Devereux using gray granite; National Register of Historic Places (1974)

== Parks ==
Washington Park at Meeting and Broad Streets; developed 1818 when City Hall relocated to this corner; Live Oak tree canopy, gates, benches, monuments make for a quiet, relaxing space

Colonial Lake Park, nine acres between Rutledge Avenue, Broad Street, and Ashley Avenue; set aside for public use in 1768; most active park on Broad Street

Moultrie Playground at Broad and Ashley Avenue; tennis courts, baseball diamond, playground
