= John Lining House =

Historic house in Charleston, South Carolina, United States

Coordinates: 32.776418°N 79.932837°W

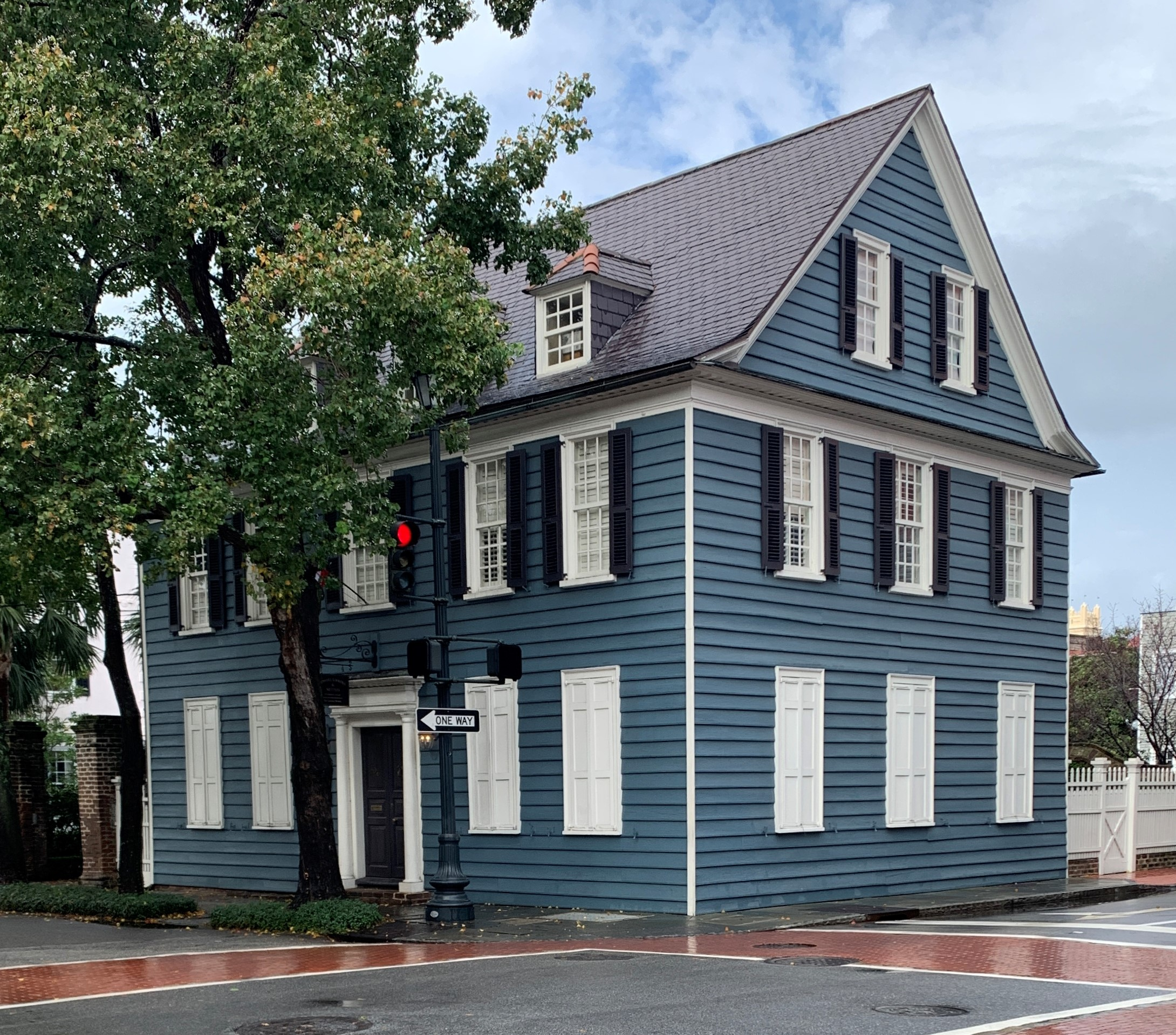
The John Lining House is at 106 Broad Street, Charleston, South Carolina.

The John Lining House is one of the oldest houses in Charleston, South Carolina, United States.

Although the lot upon which the house stands was first conveyed to French Huguenot immigrant Jaques DeBordeaux in 1694, it is uncertain when the house was built; the first mention of a house appears in a 1715 deed by which the property, including a dwelling, was conveyed to William Harvey, Jr. In 1757, the house was received by Mrs. Sarah Lining, the wife of Dr. John Lining. Although the couple owned the house for less than one year before transferring it to John Rattray, Lining's name stuck as the name of the dwelling. In 1780, the building was acquired by Dr. Andrew Turnbull, the founder of New Smyrna, Florida, who opened in the house the first of a long series of apothecary shops which remained until 1960.

On January 11, 1938, a plaque dedicated to John Lining was added to the house.

An 1858 plat of the Lining House showed dependencies to the north of the house.

In 1960, the house was in danger of being demolished, but it was bought by the Preservation Society of Charleston in late 1961 and restored at a cost of $75,000.
