= John Lining =

Scottish-American physician and scientist

- Born: 1708
- Died: September 21, 1760 (aged 52); Charleston, South Carolina
- Occupations: Physician, scientist
- Known for: Clinical climatology, yellow fever research
- Spouse: Sarah Hill (married 1738)

John Lining (April 1708–September 21, 1760) was a Scottish-American physician, botanist, and scientist.

== Early life and career ==
John Lining was born in April 1708 in Lanarkshire, Scotland to Thomas Lining, a minister, and Anne Hamilton.

He studied medicine in Scotland. (Note: Exact university unknown in Scotland. The South Carolina Encyclopedia asserts that he potentially studied at Leyden University in the Netherlands.) He immigrated to Charleston in 1728. (Note: Sources differ in the actual year that he immigrated to Charleston, ranging from 1728 to 1730.) Before serving as a physician, he advertised medical elixirs and medicines in the South Carolina Gazette. Lining had extensive membership outside of his roles as a physician and scientist: he was a founding member of the St. Andrew's Society, was a Mason, served as the president of the Charleston Library Society, and served as a justice (court for general sessions and the court of common pleas).

He married Sarah Hill in 1739 (died 1789), who came from an elite family in Charles Towne. Together, they had 11 children. (Note: Other sources have incorrectly claimed that his marriage did not produce children.)

Lining died in Charleston in 1761.

=== Medicine ===
Lining was a physician to the poor in St. Philip's Parish and in a port responsible for quarantine. He grew his practice, and in 1740, became partners with the physician Lionel Chalmers.

In 1756, Lining published a clinical description of yellow fever after epidemics continuously ravaged the Charles Towne colony. In this work, he described the symptoms, course, and prognosis of the illness. He discussed warm weather as an influence on these epidemics, as the fevers seemed to dissipate during cooler months. His built on the work of Henry Warren, who claimed that yellow fever was related to the "infectious miasma" that occurred in the warmer months in Barbados. He described the contagious nature of the disease, claiming that it originated from the West Indies. He correctly concluded that after curing the infection, the patient would be immune. He incorrectly claimed that African people were immune to yellow fever, a common claim made by physicians at the time.

There are multiple claims that Lining was the first to publish on yellow fever, which are false: the first publication on the disease was published in 1749 by John Moultrie Jr.

Due to the weather's impacts on yellow fever, Lining gained an interest in clinical climatology. He began to conduct experiments on meteorological phenomena as early as 1737 using a thermometer, barometer and hygrometer. (Note: The majority of sources list his meteorological research as being completed from 1738 to 1753.) He wrote a letter to Dr. Mortimer Cromwell at the Royal Society about the weather conditions that he recorded in Charles Towne:

In summer the heat of the shaded air about 2 or 3 in the afternoon is frequently between 90 and 95 degrees, and the 14th, 15th, and 16th of June 1738 at 3PM it was 98 degrees, a heat equal to the greatest heat of the human body in health. The thermometer when buried in the sands of the streets when the heat of the shaded air was 88 degrees roses in 5 minutes to 108 degrees, tho there was at the same time a moderate wind.

He published his results in The Philosophical Transactions the Royal Society of London (1748, 1753). In 1761, his observations appeared in the Description of South Carolina, written by then Governor James Glen. His meteorological observations are reputed to be the earliest records in America. In 1776, his clinical climatology research and experimentation on meteorology were included in a publication on weather and disease by Lionel Chalmers.

=== Science ===
As early as 1753, Lining took an interest in Benjamin Franklin's experiments on electricity. He abandoned his medical practice in 1754 after experiencing repeated gout attacks and instead fully dedicated his time to experimentation with electricity and cultivating indigo. After repeating Franklin's experimentation with a kite in 1754, he sent a letter to Charles Pinckney, Esq. about his observations and results. Later that year, Pinckney communicated Lining's letter to the Royal Society of London about an electrical apparatus used by George William Richman. He repeated Franklin's kite experiments, and engaged in correspondence with Benjamin Franklin on electrical experimentation.

In 1740, John Lining began to make metabolic ("statical") experiments on himself, recording observations of his food intake and excretions. The culmination of his detailed records were published in Philosophical Transactions, and sent a letter to James Jurin on his observations across a year. His experiments were later referenced in David Ramsay's History of South Carolina.

Lining was a botanist and plant collector who sent plant specimens to Charles Alston and Robert Whytt at Edinburgh University. In 1754, he published on the benefits and toxicity of the Indian pinkroot when used as a vermifuge.

== Bibliography ==
- A description of the American yellow fever (1799)
- An essay on the malignant pestilential fever introduced into the West Indian Islands from Boullam, on the coast of Guinea, as it appeared in 1793 and 1794. (1799)
- Medical observations showing relation between weather and human food, excetra, exercise (1741)
- Further experiments on food & excreta, with tables of quantities (1745)
- Of the anthelmintic virtues of the root of the Indian Pink (1754)

== Legacy ==
On January 11, 1938, a memorial plaque was erected at the John Lining House in Charleston, South Carolina. The plaque still rests on the outside of 106 Broad Street as of 2026.

Three biographies have been written about Lining and his contributions to science.
