= Elizabeth Timothy =

First female American newspaper publisher

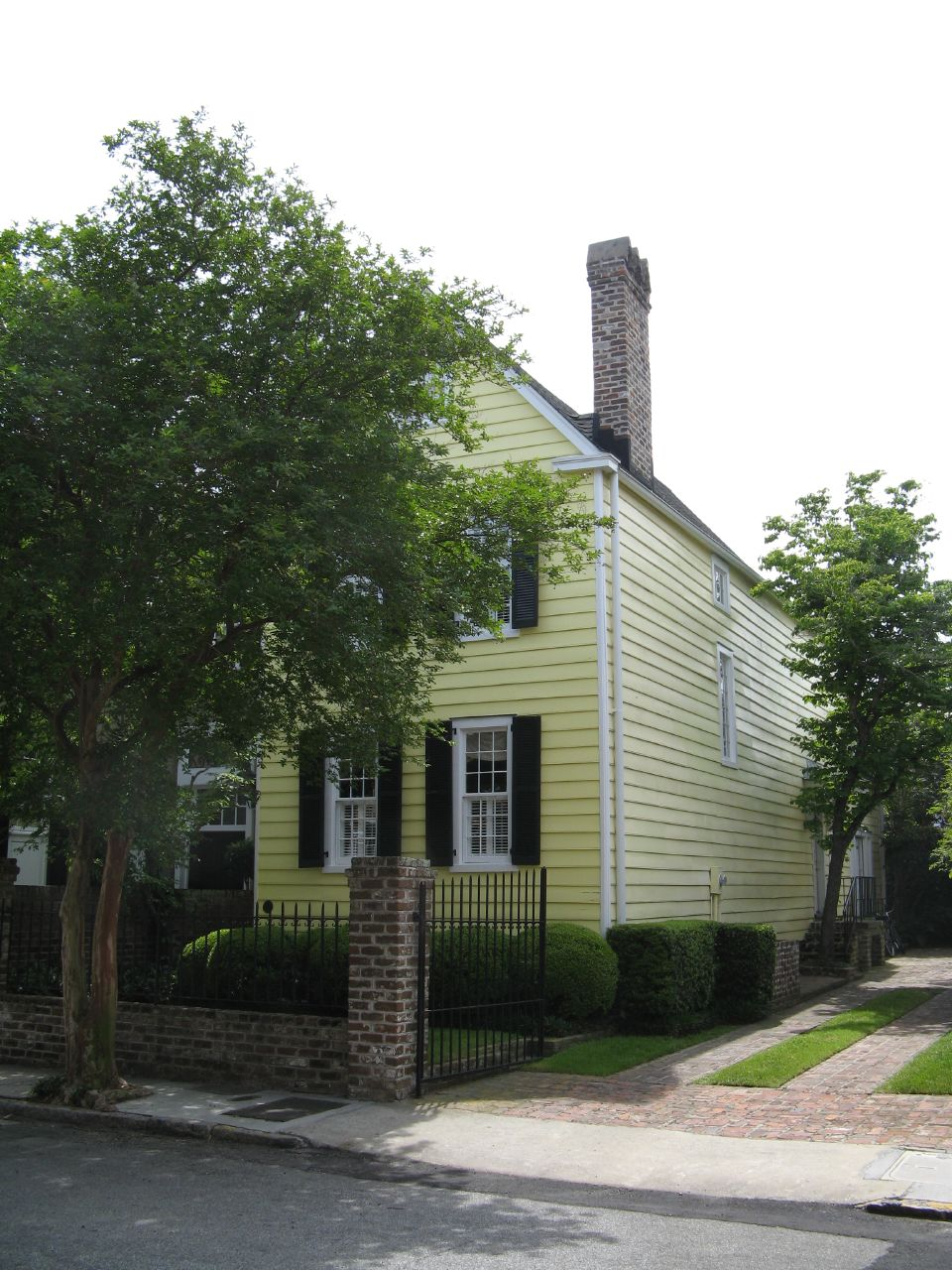
Print shop of Lewis Timothy, Elizabeth's husband

Elizabeth Timothy (née Villin born 30 June 1702 – died 2 April 1757) was the first female newspaper publisher and editor in America.

== Early life ==
Born Elizabeth Villin on 30 June 1702, in Amsterdam, the Netherlands, she married Lewis Timothy, a Huguenot, in 1724. They emigrated to Philadelphia in 1731, with their four children at that time.

== Career ==
In Philadelphia, Lewis worked with Benjamin Franklin, who trained him in the printing business. In 1733, Franklin sent Lewis to Charleston, South Carolina, to revive the South Carolina Gazette, the colony's first successful newspaper.

When Lewis died suddenly in 1738, Elizabeth Timothy assumed responsibility for managing both the newspaper and the printshop, making her the first female editor and publisher in American history. Timothy published her first issue of the paper on 4 January 1739. Her eldest son, Peter Timothy, was listed as the publisher, as a woman was not allowed to hold that title. However, Peter Timothy, at 13 years old, was too young to take over for his father; the issue also announced that Elizabeth Timothy would be running the paper's operations.

Timothy continued running the newspaper, publishing news, poetry and literary classics until 1746, when her son, Peter Timothy, then aged 21, took over his mother's role as publisher and editor. Elizabeth Timothy opened a bookstore, which she ran for a year before leaving Charleston for Philadelphia. She later returned to Charleston and died there on April 2, 1757. She is buried in St. Philip's Church.

== Bibliography ==
- Brigham, Clarence Saunders (1947). History & Bibliography of American Newspapers, 1690-1820. American Antiquarian Society.
- Eldridge, Larry D. (1 January 1997). Women and Freedom in Early America. NYU Press. ISBN 978-0-8147-2198-8.
- Emery, Edwin (1962). The press and America. Prentice-Hall.
- Frasca, Ralph (2006). Benjamin Franklin's Printing Network. University of Missouri Press. ISBN 978-0-8262-6492-3.
- McKerns, Joseph P. (1989). Biographical Dictionary of American Journalism. Greenwood. ISBN 978-0-313-23819-2.
- Krismann, Carol (2005). Encyclopedia of American Women in Business. Greenwood Publishing Group. ISBN 031333384X.
- Marzolf, Marion (1977). Up from the footnote. Hastings House. ISBN 0803875029.
- Perry, Lee Davis (2009). Remarkable South Carolina Women. Globe Pequot. ISBN 978-0-7627-4343-8.
- Read, Phyllis J. (1992). The Book of Women's Firsts. Random House Information Group. ISBN 978-0-679-40975-5.
- Schilpp, Madelon Golden (1983). Great women of the press. Southern Illinois University Press. ISBN 0809310988.
- Sherrow, Victoria (2002). A to Z of American Entrepreneurs. Facts On File, Incorporated. ISBN 978-0-8160-4556-3.
- Turner, Janine (4 March 2008). Holding Her Head High. Thomas Nelson Inc. ISBN 978-1-4185-3762-3.
- Vaughn, Stephen L. (2007). Encyclopedia of American Journalism. CRC Press. ISBN 978-0203942161.
- Waldrup, Carole Chandler (1 January 1999). Colonial Women. McFarland. p. 125. ISBN 978-0-7864-5106-7.
- Wallace, David Duncan (1951). South Carolina: A Short History, 1520-1948. University of North Carolina Press.
- "18th Century S.C. women". The Times and Democrat. Orangeburg, South Carolina. 19 September 1982. p. 28 – via Newspapers.com.
- "Early Journalism in S.C." The Greenville News. Greenville, South Carolina. 27 May 1934. p. 21 – via Newspapers.com.
- "Women in History". The Times and Democrat. Orangeburg, South Carolina. 4 March 2007. p. 26 – via Newspapers.com.
