= South Carolina Gazette =

Newspaper

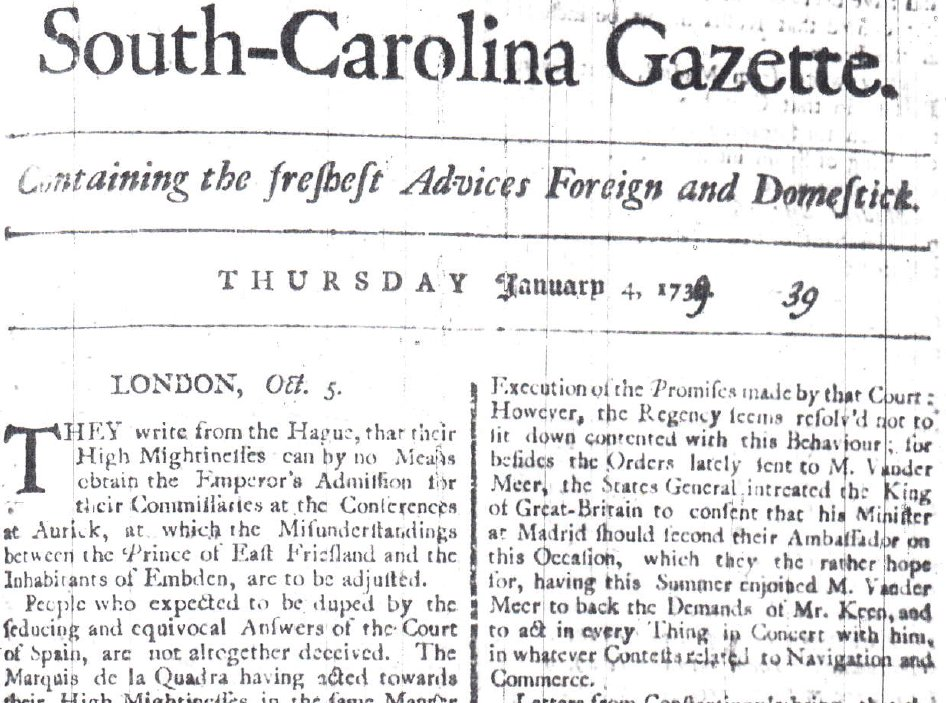
- Front page, January 4, 1739
- Founded: 1732

The South Carolina Gazette (1732–1775) was South Carolina's first successful newspaper. The paper began in 1732 under Thomas Whitmarsh in Charlestown (now Charleston), but within two years Whitmarsh died of yellow fever. In 1734 another former printer with Benjamin Franklin, Lewis Timothy, revived the Gazette and ran it until his accidental death in December 1738. His widow Elizabeth then ran both the paper and the print shop until their son, Peter, was old enough to take over. Peter also worked with the colonial postal service and was appointed Deputy Postmaster-General of the Southern Provinces.

The Gazette printed news of Europe, what the royalty had worn at the last formal event, news of the colony, notices of births, deaths, marriages and estate auctions, and advertisements, including those for runaway slaves. It was in his own Gazette that Peter Timothy advertised in 1764 for his own runaway black slave, a "well dressed female who spoke English, French and Italian" – and whom he apparently never found.

The newspaper stopping publishing in December 1775, but Timothy recommenced publishing under the title Gazette of the State of South Carolina in April 1777.

Timothy and his wife Anna had a son named Benjamin Franklin Timothy and a daughter, Elizabeth, who by the time the Revolution was well underway had married, borne two children, and been widowed. Peter Timothy was from his early years a Patriot, was known to join in from time to time around the Liberty Tree, and expressed his views in the Gazette. When, in 1780, as Charleston prepared again for an invasion by the British, Peter Timothy boarded a ship with Colonel John Laurens (e.g., John's March 4, 1780 letter to his father), to chase the British and keep his Journal reporting on the events of the time, making Peter Timothy one of America's earliest war correspondents.

However, when Charleston was captured in May, 1780, the Gazette was seized by the British and given to the Tory Robert Wells, who continued it as the Royal Gazette, reflecting the British perspective. In August Peter Timothy was one of almost 100 leading citizens dragged out of his house and put aboard the prison ship Sandwich, headed for prison in St. Augustine while their families are exiled to Philadelphia because "there are too many plots a-foot." Although another prisoner, Christopher Gadsden, reports that all have arrived safely enough, he apparently did not know that Peter Timothy had not arrived. According to British records he was "lost overboard." According to a local contemporary writing in 1810, in 1781 Timothy was exchanged for another prisoner and delivered to Philadelphia. The following autumn he and two daughters and a grandchild died when sailing to Antigua. The ship "foundered in a violent gale of wind, and every soul on board perished."

After the British occupation ended, Peter's widow Anna continued the paper until their son, Benjamin Franklin Timothy (1771-1807), was able to take over and publish the paper until September 1802.

== See also ==
- Early American publishers and printers
