= Ulyanovsk =

City in Ulyanovsk Oblast, Russia

Ulyanovsk Ульяновск
- City
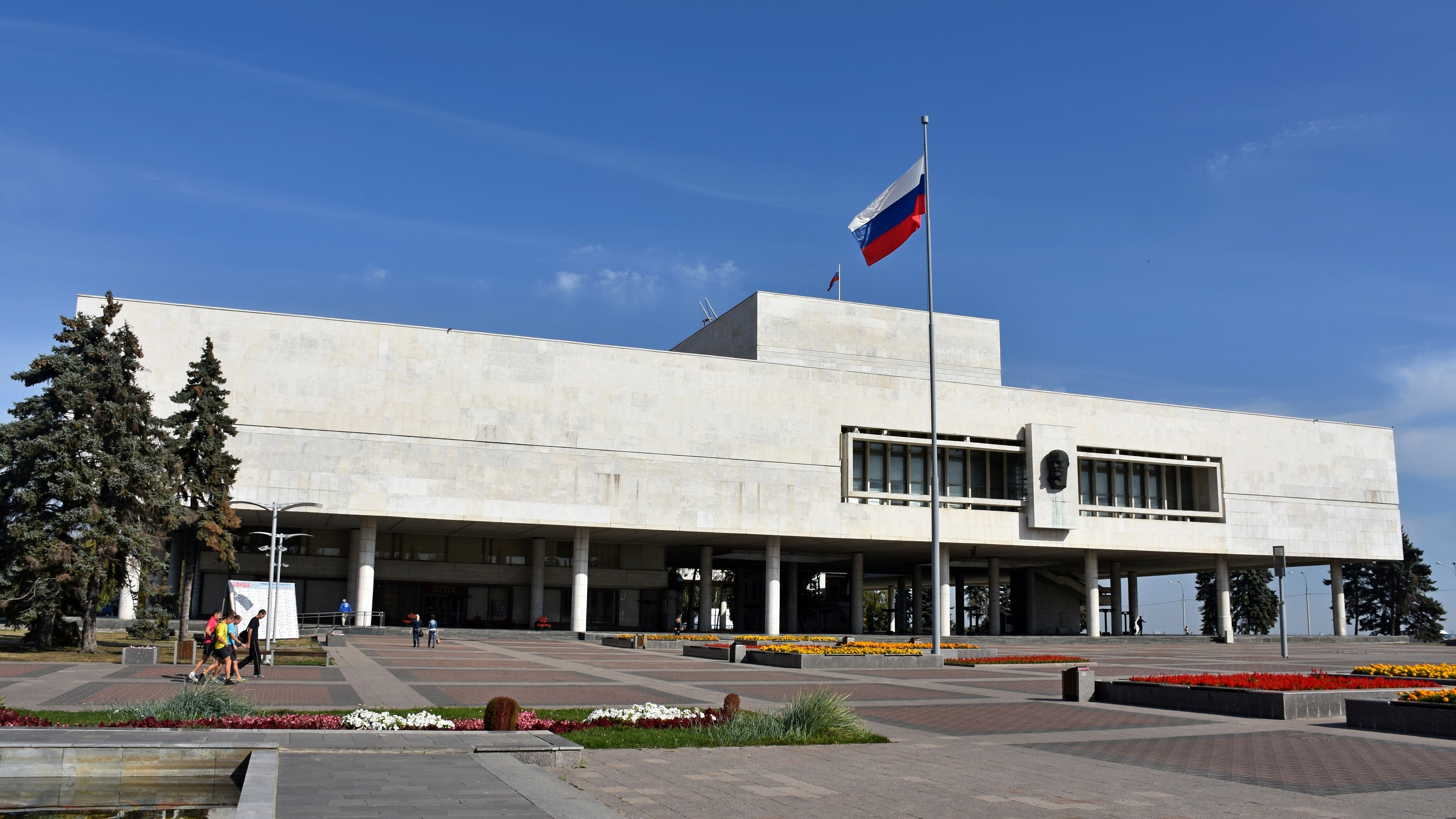
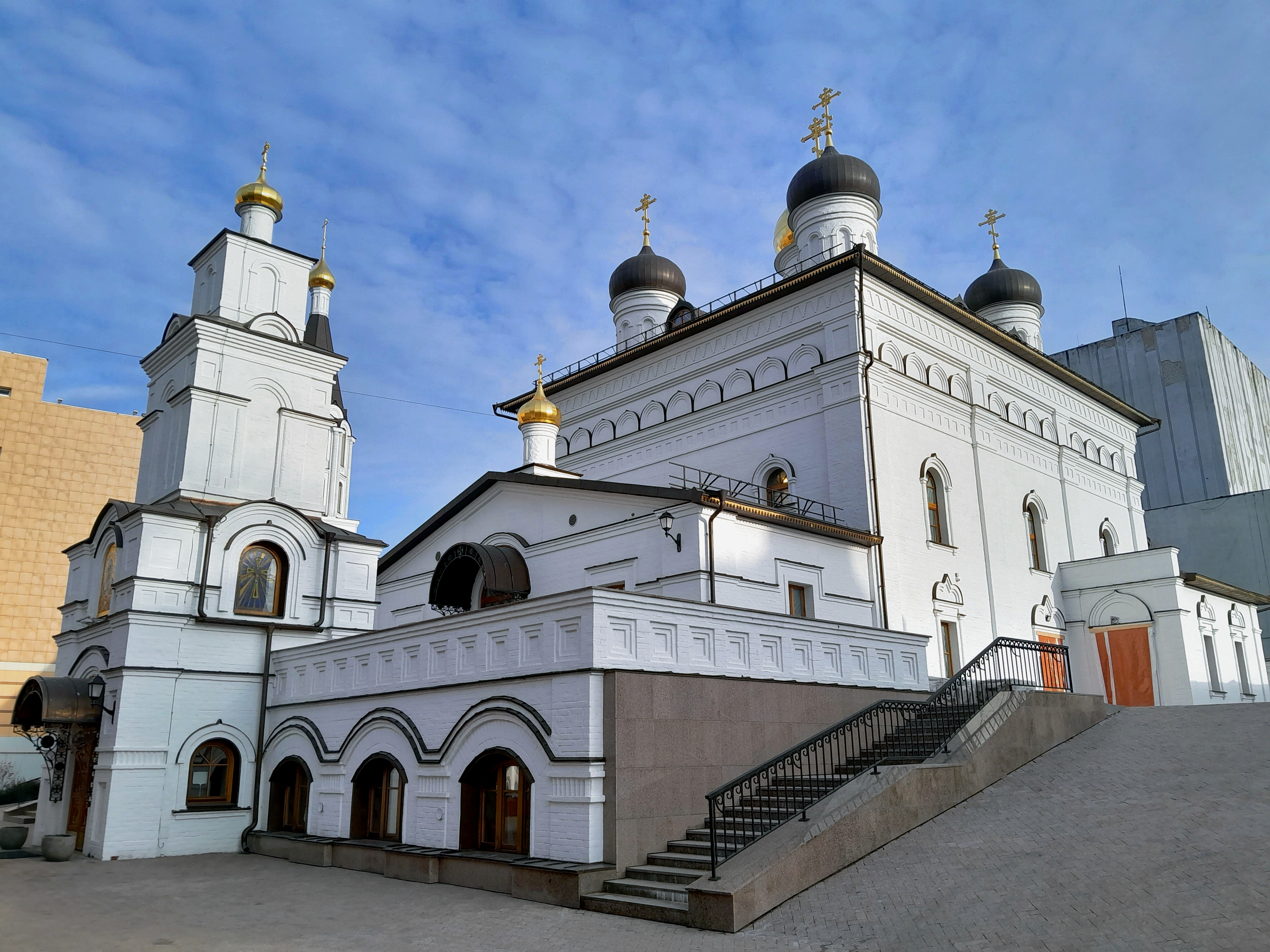
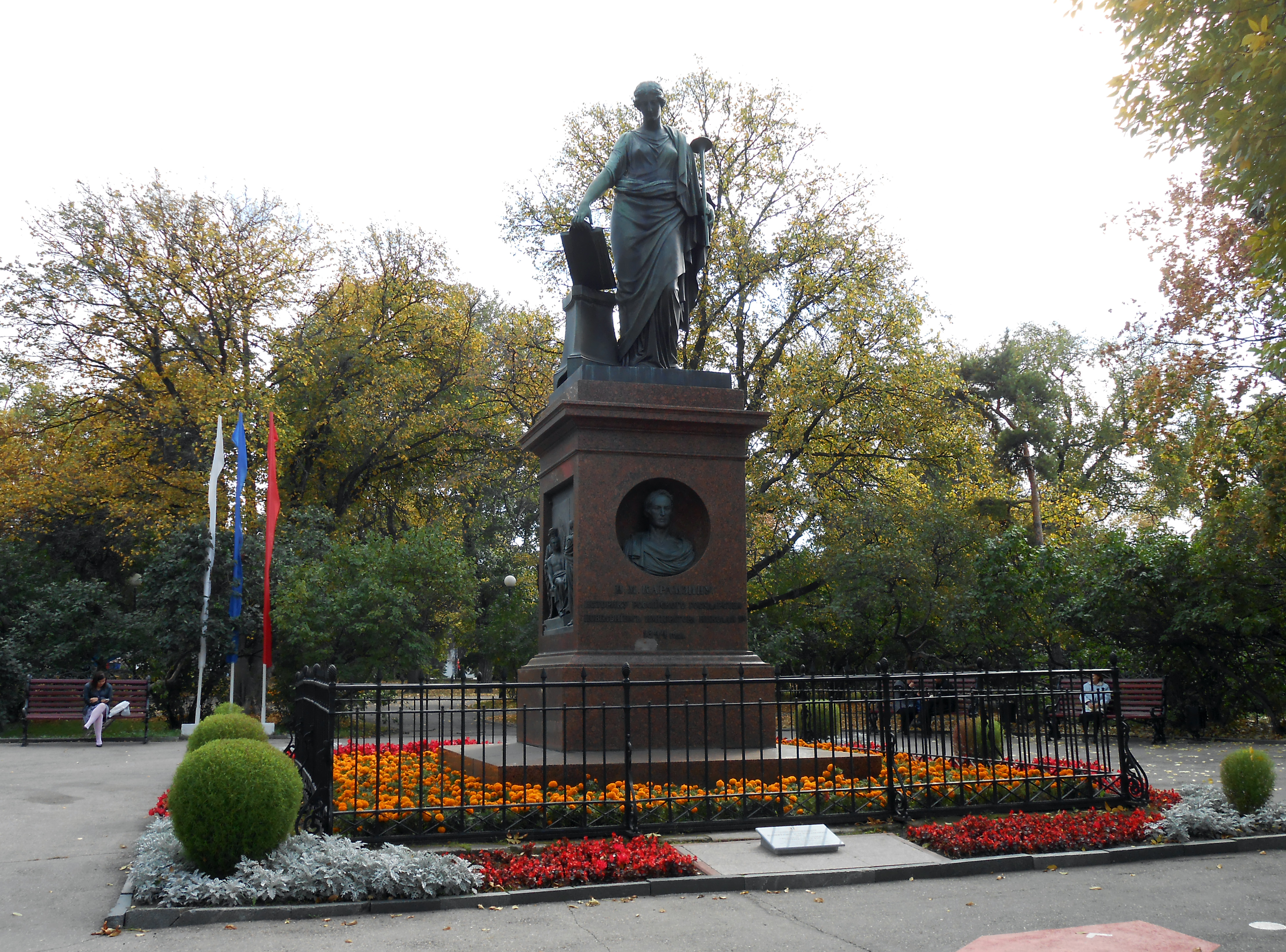
- Lenin Memorial Museum Building of the Simbirsk Land Bank Goncharov Memorial House Spassky Monastery Karamzin Monument Panorama of the Zavolzhye region

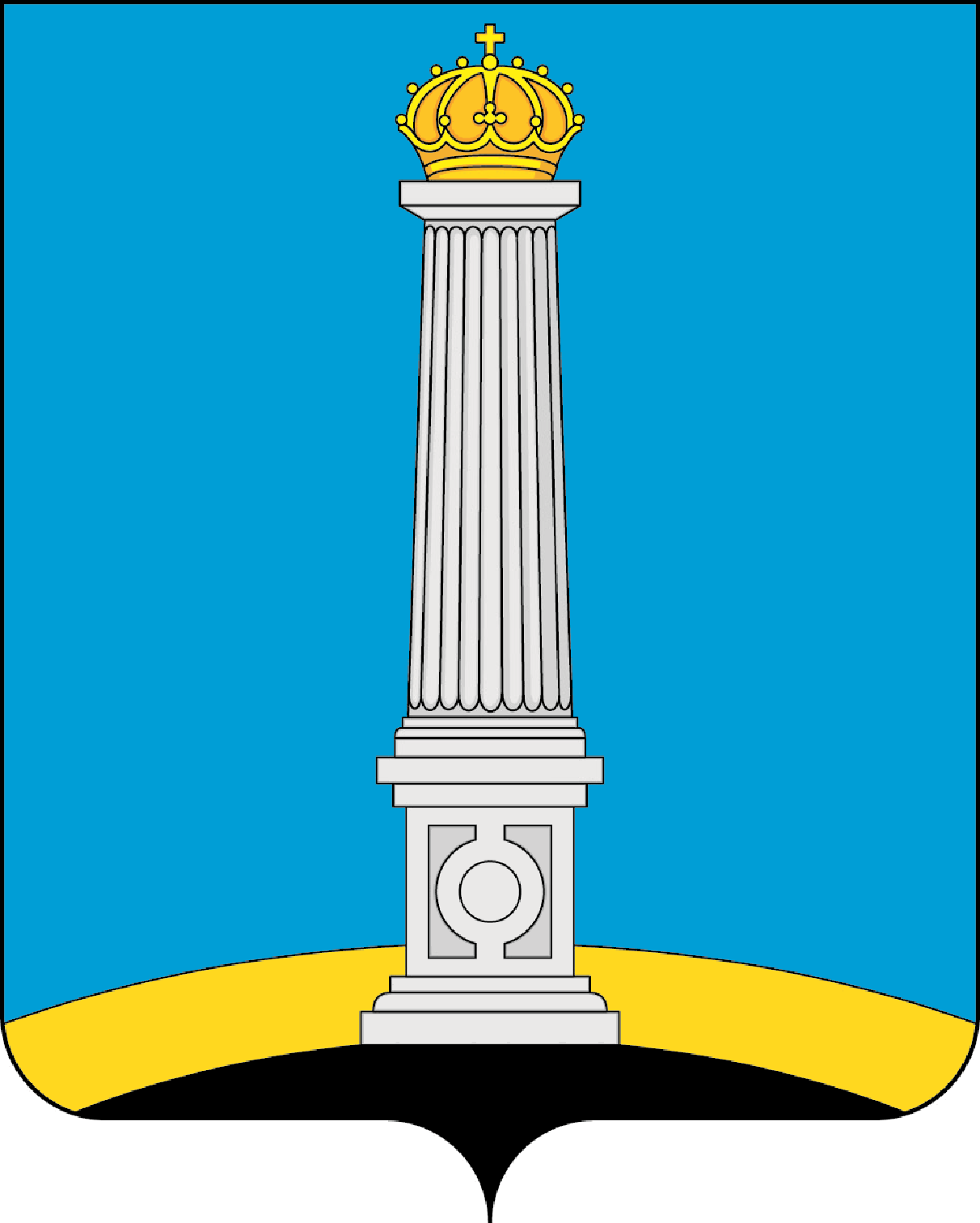
- Flag Coat of arms
- Interactive map of Ulyanovsk
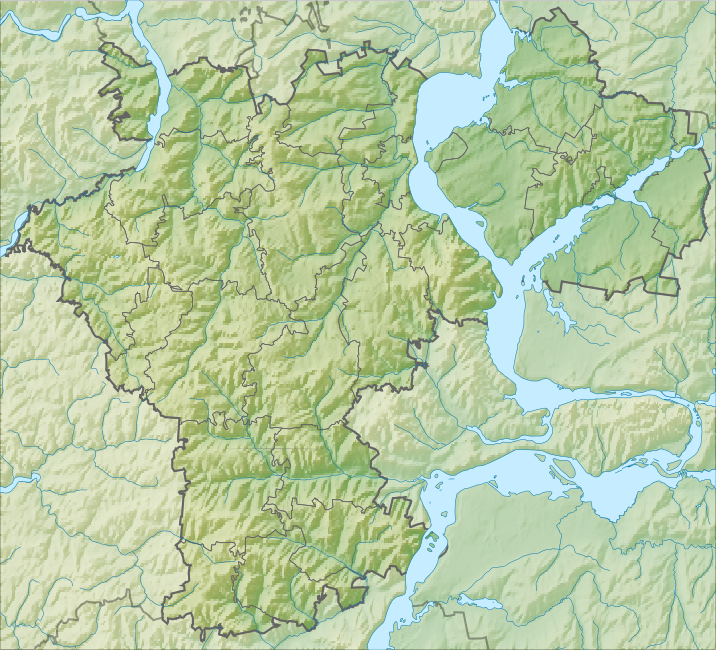
- Location of Ulyanovsk Ulyanovsk (European Russia) Ulyanovsk (Europe)
- Coordinates: 54°19′N 48°22′E
- Country: Russia
- Federal subject: Ulyanovsk Oblast
- Founded: 1648
- City status since: 1796

Government
  - Body: City Duma
  - Head: Alexander Boldakin

Area
  - Total: 316.9 km^{2} (122.4 sq mi)
- Elevation: 150 m (490 ft)

Population (2010 Census)
  - Total: 613,786
  - Estimate (2025): 612,516 (−0.2%)
  - Rank: 20th in 2010
  - Density: 1,937/km^{2} (5,016/sq mi)

Administrative status
  - Subordinated to: city of oblast significance of Ulyanovsk
  - Capital of: Ulyanovsk Oblast, city of oblast significance of Ulyanovsk

Municipal status
  - Urban okrug: Ulyanovsk Urban Okrug
  - Capital of: Ulyanovsk Urban Okrug
- Time zone: UTC+4 (UTC+04:00)
- Postal code: 432xxx
- Dialing code: +7 8422
- OKTMO ID: 73701000001
- City Day: June 12
- Website: www.ulmeria.ru

Ulyanovsk, (Note: Russian: Ульяновск, IPA: [ʊˈlʲjanəfsk], Tatar: Сембер, Chuvash: Чĕмпĕр) known as Simbirsk (Note: Russian: Симби́рск, IPA: [sʲɪm⁽ʲ⁾ˈbʲirsk]) until 1924, is a city and the administrative center of Ulyanovsk Oblast, Russia, located on the Volga River 705 kilometers (438 mi) east of Moscow. Ulyanovsk has been the only Russian UNESCO City of Literature since 2015.

The city was the birthplace of Vladimir Lenin (born Ulyanov), for whom it was renamed after his death in 1924; and of Alexander Kerensky, the leader of the Russian Provisional Government which Lenin overthrew during the October Revolution of 1917. It is also famous for its writers such as Ivan Goncharov, Nikolay Yazykov and Nikolay Karamzin, and for painters such as Arkady Plastov and Nikas Safronov.

== History ==
Simbirsk was founded in 1648 by the boyar Bogdan Khitrovo. The fort of "Simbirsk" (alternatively "Sinbirsk") was strategically placed on a hill on the western bank of the Volga River. The fort was meant to protect the eastern frontier of the Tsardom of Russia from the nomadic tribes and to establish a permanent royal presence in the area. In 1668, Simbirsk withstood a month-long siege by a 20,000-strong army led by rebel Cossack commander Stenka Razin. Also in Simbirsk another country rebel, Yemelyan Pugachev, was imprisoned before execution. At the time Simbirsk possessed a wooden kremlin, which was destroyed by a fire during the 18th century.

As the eastern border of the Russian Empire was rapidly pushed into Siberia, Simbirsk rapidly lost its strategic importance, but nonetheless began to develop into an important regional center. Simbirsk was granted city status in 1796.

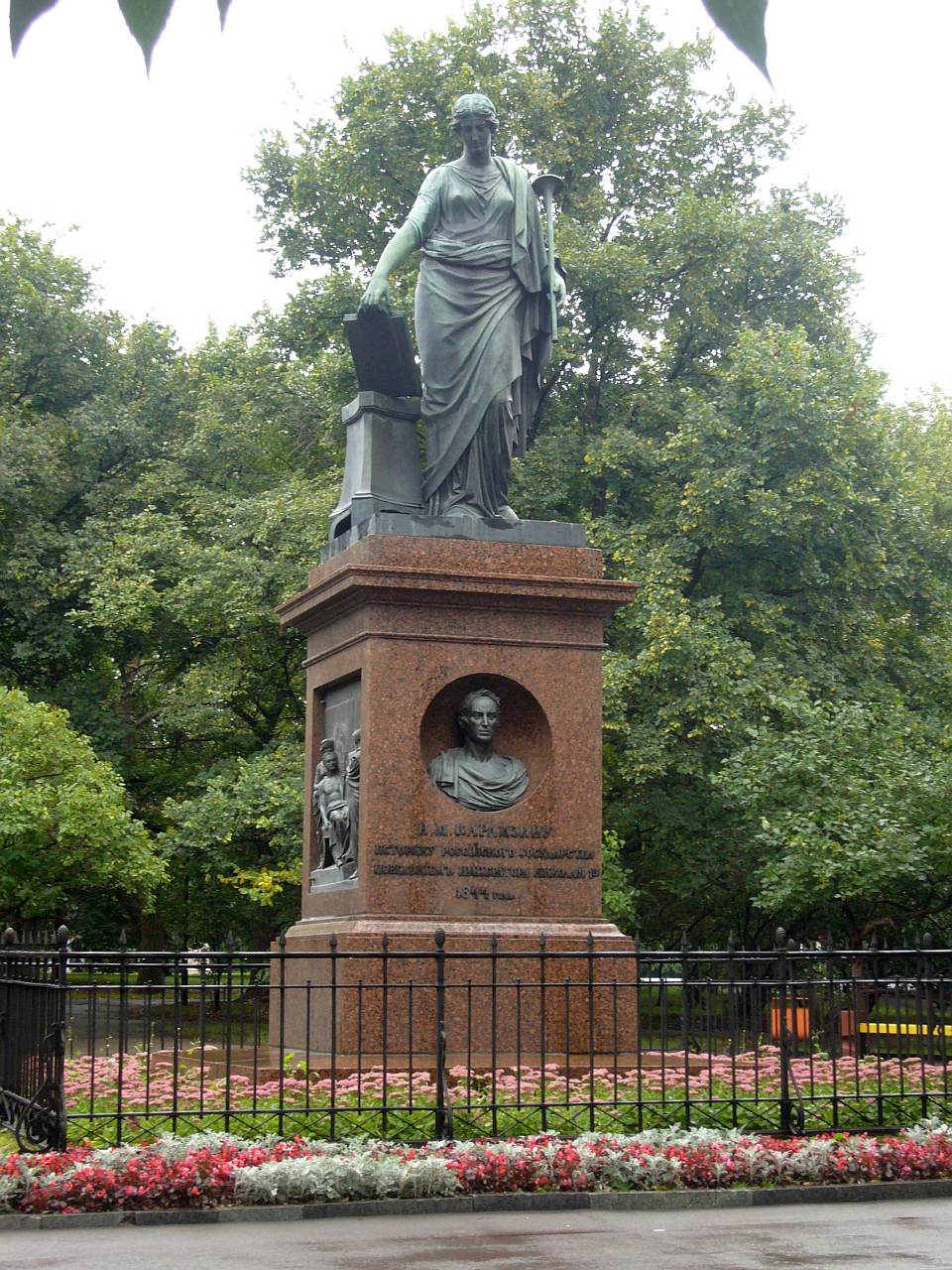
Monument to Nikolay Karamzin

Simbirsk was then considered an exclusive town favoured by the aristocracy, and besides its churches and a Governor's Place, included an Assembly of the Nobles, with a magnificent library. The Holy Trinity Cathedral was constructed in a restrained Neoclassical style between 1827 and 1841. In the summer of 1864, in what was believed an arson attack, Simbirsk was mostly destroyed by fire. However, it was quickly rebuilt and continued to grow. Its population, which was 26,000 in 1856, had reached 43,000 by 1897.

In 1924, the city was renamed Ulyanovsk in honor of Vladimir Ulyanov, better known as Lenin, who was born in Simbirsk in 1870. Two other Russian political leaders, Alexander Kerensky and Alexander Protopopov, were also born in Simbirsk.

The construction of the Kuybyshev hydroelectric plant (completed in 1957) 200 kilometers (120 mi) downstream of Ulyanovsk resulted in the flooding of significant tracts of land both north and south of Ulyanovsk and increasing the width of the Volga by up to 35 kilometers (22 mi) in some places. To this day, some populated neighborhoods of Ulyanovsk remain well below the level of the reservoir, protected from flooding by a dam: it is estimated that its catastrophic failure would submerge parts of the city comprising around 5% of its total population with as much as 10 meters (33 ft) of water.

During the Soviet period, Ulyanovsk was an important tourist center, drawing visitors from around the country because of its revolutionary importance.

After the dissolution of the Soviet Union, the tourist importance of Ulyanovsk sharply decreased. In the 1990s, the city went through the hardest times—a slump in production in all branches, mass unemployment, and a population impoverishment. In the first decade of the 2000s the economy started to grow.

Ulyanovsk slowly recovered from these downturns into regional manufacturing, educational and transportation clusters.

== Politics ==
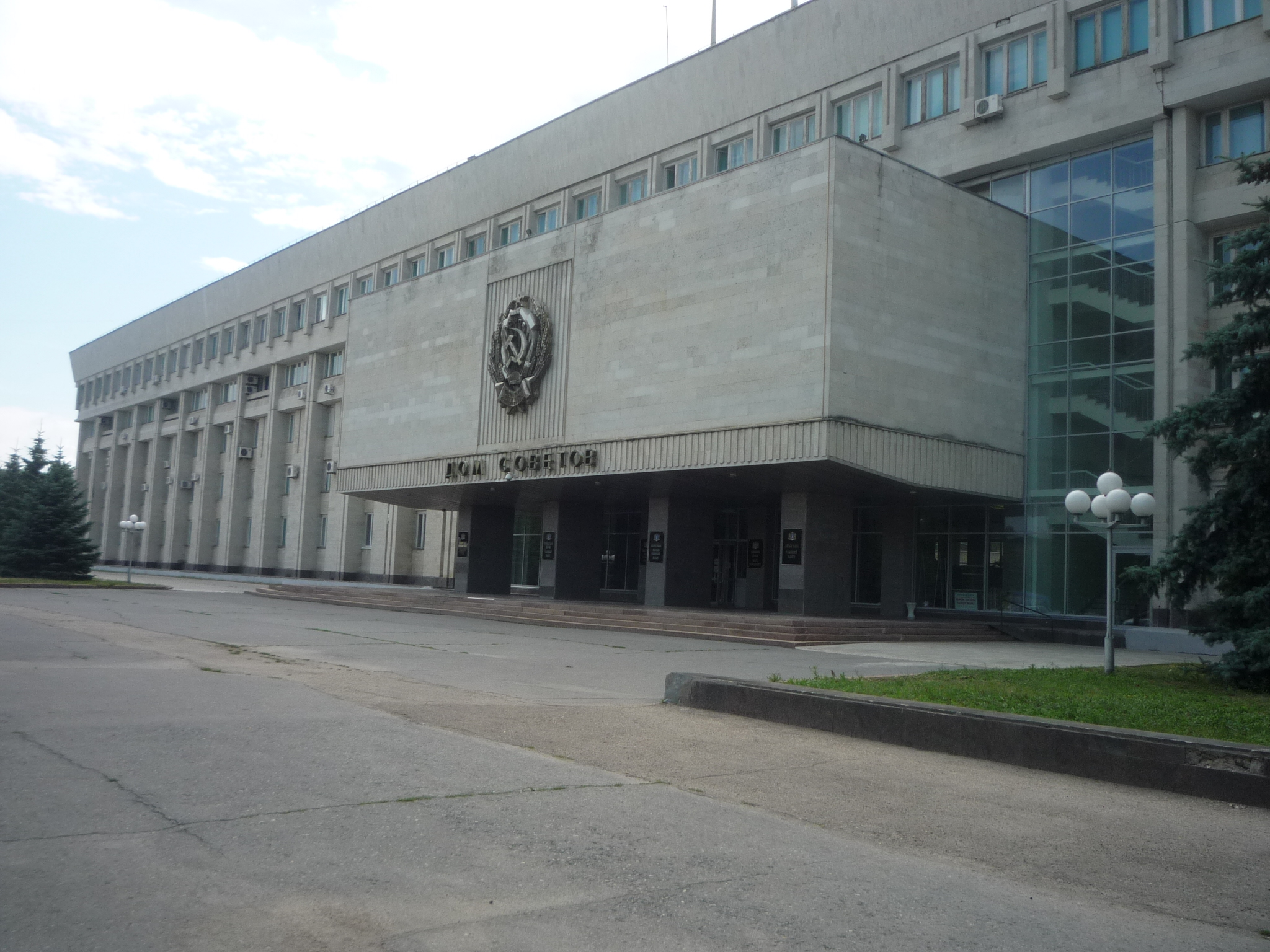
Ulyanovsk Oblast Administration

The city is headed by a mayor who is the executive branch, and city council which is the legislative branch. The term of the mayor is five years. In 2010 the city council abolished the direct elections to the mayor, replacing it with city manager, appointed by the council. Then again, in April 2013 the city charter was amended to re-introduce the direct mayoral election.

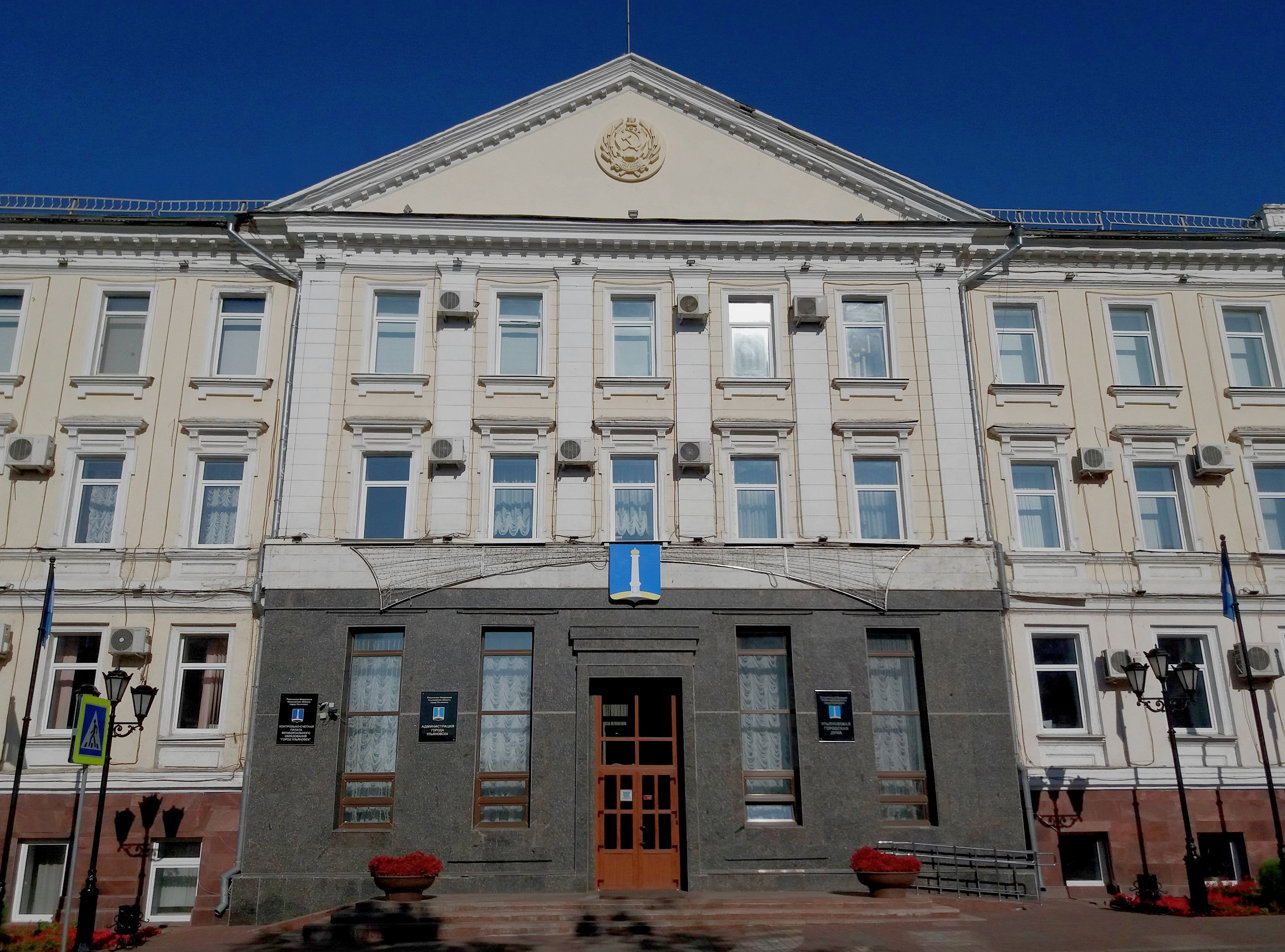
Ulyanovsk Government Administration building

== Administrative and municipal status ==
Ulyanovsk serves as the administrative center of the oblast. Within the framework of administrative divisions, it is, together with thirty rural localities, incorporated as the city of oblast significance of Ulyanovsk—an administrative unit with the status equal to that of the districts. As a municipal division, the city of oblast significance of Ulyanovsk is incorporated as Ulyanovsk Urban Okrug.

== Demographics ==
Historical population
Year	Pop.	±%
1897	41,700	—
1926	70,562	+69.2%
1939	103,779	+47.1%
1959	205,942	+98.4%
1970	351,085	+70.5%
1979	463,964	+32.2%
1989	625,155	+34.7%
2002	635,947	+1.7%
2010	637,564	+0.3%
2021	617,352	−3.2%
Source: Census data

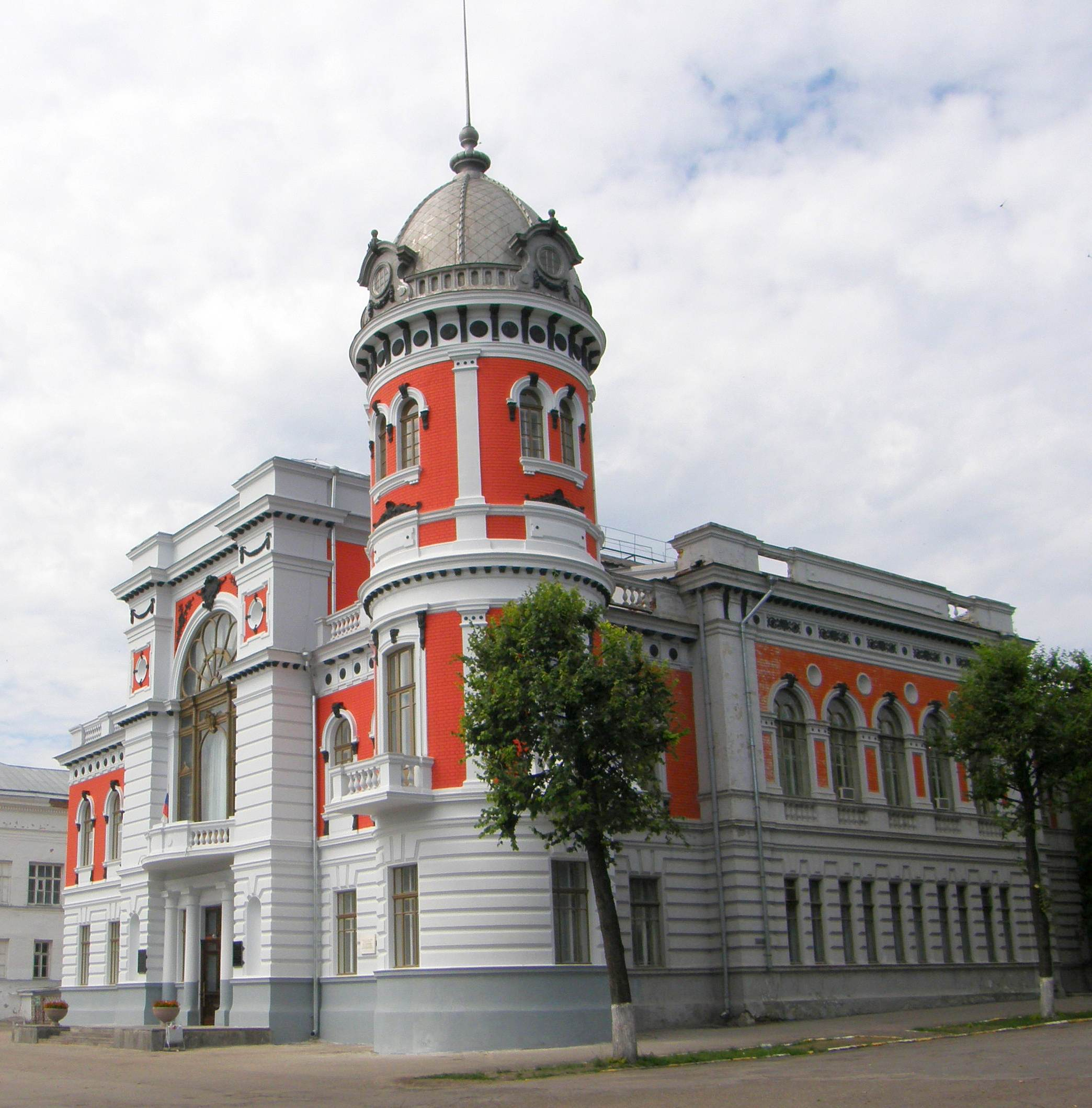
Regional Museum of History and Arts

In 2008, there were registered 6,774 births and 8,054 deaths in Ulyanovsk.

=== Ethnic composition ===
- Russians: 78%
- Tatars: 10%
- Chuvash: 6%
- Mordvins: 2%
- Germans: 1%

== Climate ==
Ulyanovsk has a humid continental climate (Köppen climate classification Dfb). Average temperature is −10.2 °C (13.6 °F) in February and 20.6 °C (69.1 °F) in July. Falls are generally warm, with snow beginning to accumulate by mid-November. Winters tend to be cold but with moderate amounts of snowfall and nighttime lows occasionally dipping below −25 °C (−13 °F). Summer weather arrives in mid-May. Precipitation averages about 480 millimeters (19 in). The city is subject to frequent, but moderate, droughts. Springs and summers are sunny, but fall and winter are usually cloudy. Median annual temperature is +5.1 °C (41.2 °F).

A maximum temperature of +39.3 °C (102.7 °F) was recorded on 2 August 2010, during a record-breaking heat wave.

Climate data for Ulyanovsk (1991–2020, extremes 1948–present)
Month	Jan	Feb	Mar	Apr	May	Jun	Jul	Aug	Sep	Oct	Nov	Dec	Year
Record high °C (°F)	5.6 (42.1)	5.6 (42.1)	19.4 (66.9)	30.0 (86.0)	36.2 (97.2)	37.5 (99.5)	38.9 (102.0)	39.3 (102.7)	33.9 (93.0)	26.0 (78.8)	15.8 (60.4)	7.8 (46.0)	39.3 (102.7)
Mean daily maximum °C (°F)	−6.5 (20.3)	−5.9 (21.4)	0.8 (33.4)	12.1 (53.8)	21.0 (69.8)	24.8 (76.6)	26.9 (80.4)	25.1 (77.2)	18.3 (64.9)	9.9 (49.8)	0.6 (33.1)	−5.2 (22.6)	10.2 (50.4)
Daily mean °C (°F)	−9.8 (14.4)	−10.2 (13.6)	−3.8 (25.2)	6.1 (43.0)	14.4 (57.9)	18.5 (65.3)	20.6 (69.1)	18.5 (65.3)	12.5 (54.5)	5.6 (42.1)	−2.1 (28.2)	−8.0 (17.6)	5.2 (41.4)
Mean daily minimum °C (°F)	−13.1 (8.4)	−14.0 (6.8)	−7.9 (17.8)	0.9 (33.6)	7.8 (46.0)	12.2 (54.0)	14.4 (57.9)	12.4 (54.3)	7.6 (45.7)	1.9 (35.4)	−4.6 (23.7)	−10.8 (12.6)	0.6 (33.1)
Record low °C (°F)	−38.0 (−36.4)	−40.0 (−40.0)	−32.8 (−27.0)	−20.0 (−4.0)	−6.5 (20.3)	−2.2 (28.0)	3.8 (38.8)	−1.0 (30.2)	−4.9 (23.2)	−18.9 (−2.0)	−29.2 (−20.6)	−38.0 (−36.4)	−40.0 (−40.0)
Average precipitation mm (inches)	35 (1.4)	25 (1.0)	27 (1.1)	30 (1.2)	44 (1.7)	57 (2.2)	50 (2.0)	50 (2.0)	45 (1.8)	39 (1.5)	32 (1.3)	31 (1.2)	465 (18.3)
Average extreme snow depth cm (inches)	27 (11)	41 (16)	38 (15)	6 (2.4)	0 (0)	0 (0)	0 (0)	0 (0)	0 (0)	0 (0)	3 (1.2)	15 (5.9)	41 (16)
Average rainy days	4	3	5	11	15	16	15	15	15	16	10	5	130
Average snowy days	23	20	14	4	1	0	0	0	0.3	5	16	21	104
Average relative humidity (%)	83	81	79	67	59	67	68	70	73	79	84	84	75
Mean monthly sunshine hours	43.4	92.4	142.6	216.0	275.9	300.0	319.3	275.9	174.0	102.3	48.0	37.2	2,027
Source 1: Pogoda.ru.net
Source 2: Climatebase (sun only)

== Economy ==
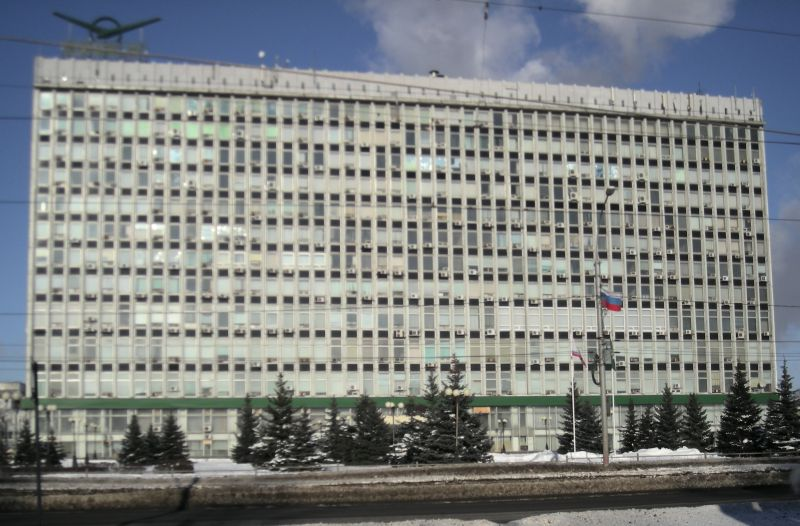
The Soviet-era headquarters of UAZ, now Sollers JSC Corporation

Ulyanovsk is a diversified industrial hub for the aircraft and auto industries.

The UAZ automobile manufacturing plant (subsidiary of Sollers JSC); Aviastar-SP Aircraft Company (part of United Aircraft Corporation); Scientific and Production Association "Mars" (manufactures industrial control systems for the Russian Navy, a subsidiary of state-owned conglomerate Agat); Ulyanovsk Cartridge Works (manufactures ammunition for firearms); Ulyanovsk Motor Plant (Ульяновский моторный завод, UMZ) and Ulyanovsk Mechanical Plant (Ульяновский механический завод, UMZ, a subsidiary of JSC Almaz-Antey) are based in the city along with a variety of light industry and food-processing enterprises.

An international airline for unique and heavy cargo, Volga-Dnepr Airlines, is based in the city.

There are many manufacturing facilities of foreign corporations such as Legrand (company), Mars, Incorporated, Takata-Petri, Anadolu Efes S.K., ALFA (Mexico) and others.

Banking is mostly represented by national banks such as Sberbank, VTB Bank, Alfa-Bank, Bin Bank, Ak Bars Bank and also regional banks from Ulyanovsk Oblast.

Ulyanovsk has also a strong military base presence in town. The 31st Airborne Brigade of the Russian Airborne Troops of the armed forces is based in Ulyanovsk.

"Bridgestone Tire Manufacturing CIS" - Japan tyre works, work from 2016.

Production of industrial gases: Linde Gas Rus, Spektrum of Gases.

=== Tourism and hospitality industry ===
Bank of Russia in Ulyanovsk

Tourism is a growing industry in the city and the surrounding areas because of Volga micro-climate and historical significance of Simbirsk. Hilton Hotel Group and Marriott Hotels & Resorts are building their hotels in the downtown area.

The region of Undory, a driving distance from Ulyanovsk is famous for its spas and mineral water. The city offers many options for sports enthusiasts. The countryside is ideal for outdoor and water sports. The springs of Undory have been known for more than 200 years. The water at spa is rich in sodium chloride, and comes from artesian wells.

=== Transportation and logistics ===
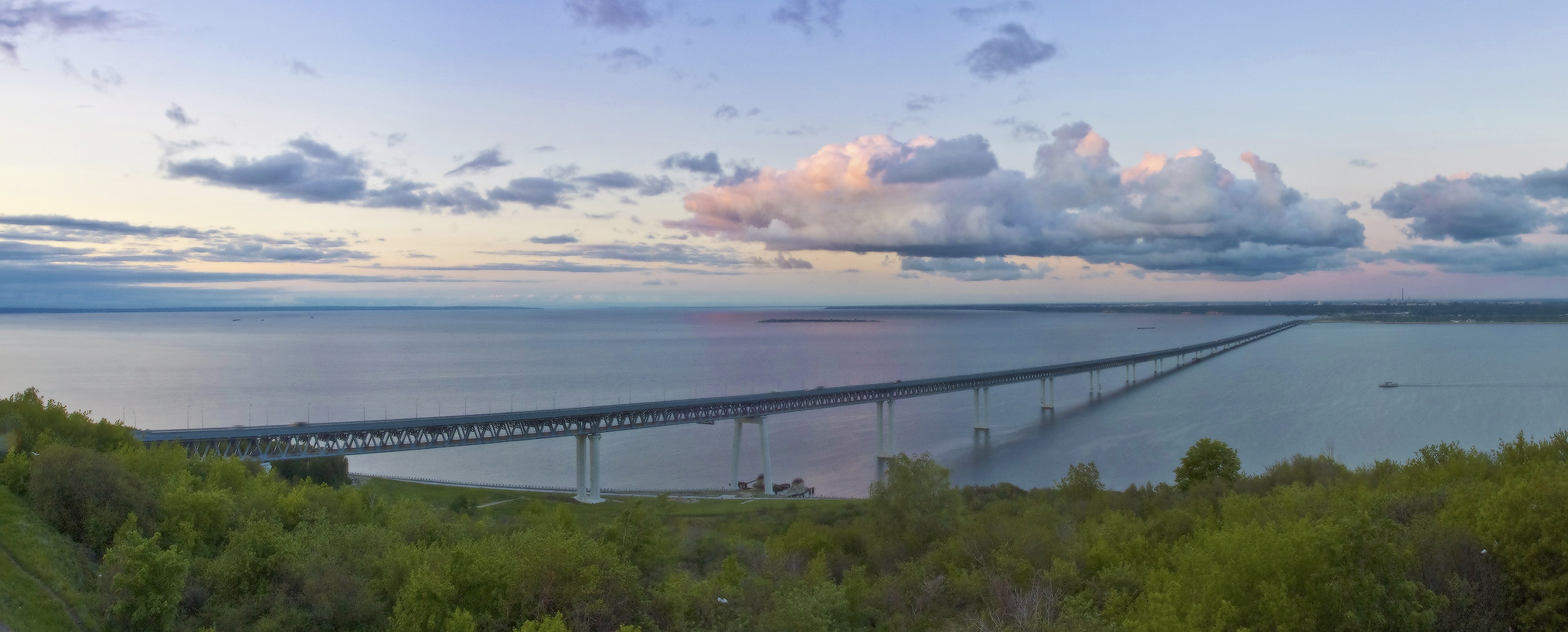
The President Bridge.

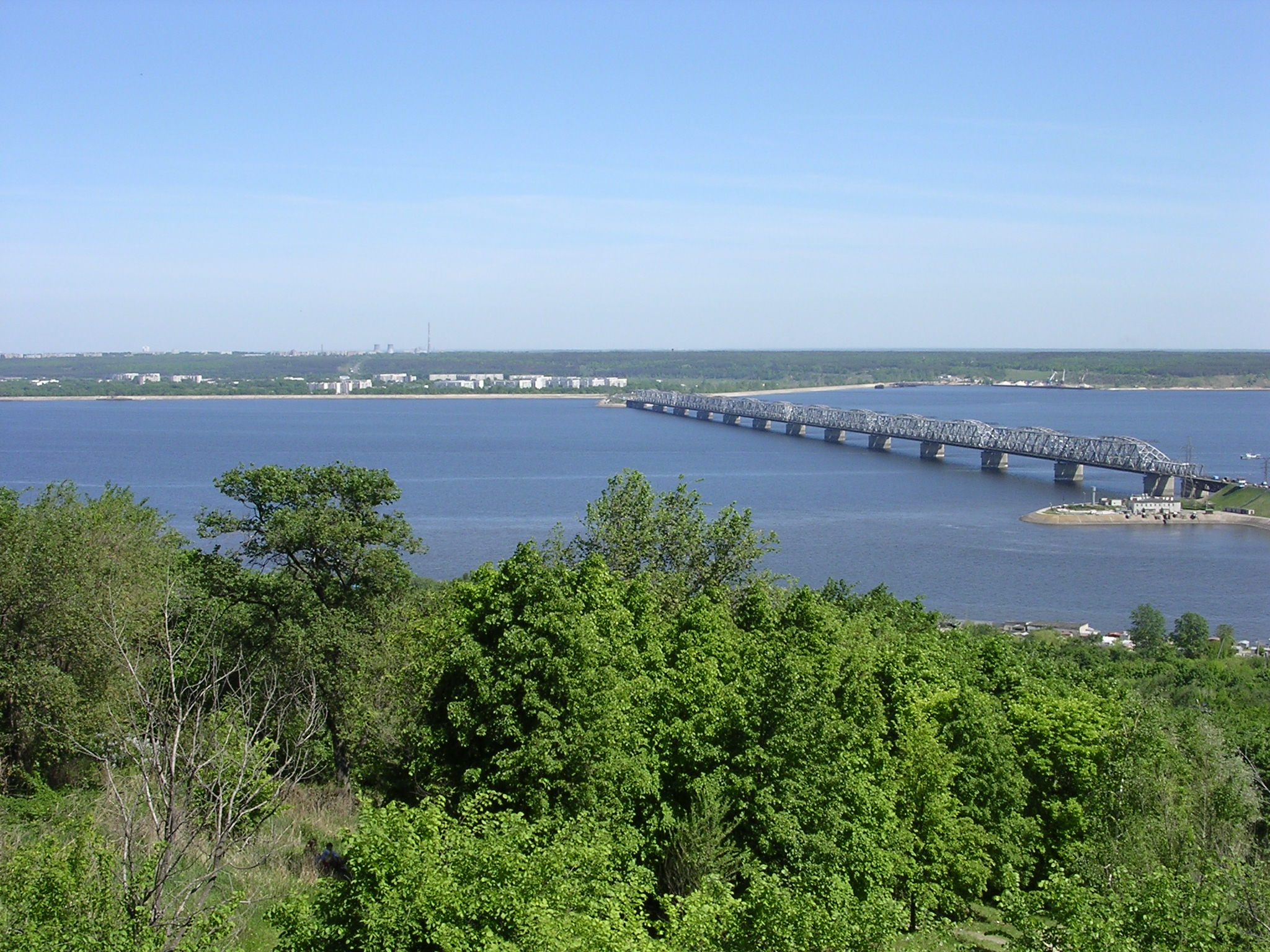
The Imperial Bridge across the Volga River in Ulyanovsk.

A railway bridge across the Volga was built in 1912–1916 and two automobile lanes were added to it in 1953–1958, allowing for the city to expand on the Eastern (left) bank of the river and transforming it into a local transport hub.

According to Ulyanovsk Region Development Corporation, Ulyanovsk Region is conveniently situated in the center of the European part of Russia, where east west and north south air, rail, car and river routes cross. It has an industrial, transport and business infrastructure and a developed network of roads and railways which provide a good basis for turning Ulyanovsk into a major transport and logistics hub in the Volga Federal district working not only for Ulyanovsk Region's plants but the whole Volga federal district. Ulyanovsk transport hub provides all forms of transport (busy river port and passenger terminal, railways with two major passenger and cargo stations, airports and now two major bridges) apart from sea, which can serve Russian and international cargo traffic to Kazakhstan, Central Asia and Southeast Asia, Europe, China and back.

As the aging Ulyanovsk bridge, the only crossing of the Volga in the 400 km stretch from Kazan to Tolyatti, could no longer cope with the growing needs of the city, the construction of President Bridge, a truss bridge, began in the late 1980s. Completion was delayed significantly due to catastrophic economic circumstances following the end of the Soviet Union. Its official opening ceremony was on November 24, 2009, by the Russian President Dmitry Medvedev – although traffic was using the bridge a few days earlier. The bridge has a total length of 5.5 km, making it one of the longest in Europe.

The city is divided by the river Sviyaga, a tributary of the Volga whose confluence with it is about 200 km north of the city.

Public transportation in the city is well developed and provided by 17 tram lines, 7 trolleybus routes (and all tram lines are only on the right-bank part of the city, and all the trolley only on the left bank), 50 municipal bus routes, and about 150 fixed-route taxi (marshrutkas) lines. The City of Ulyanovsk has a working plan to build high-speed rail system to connect the two banks of the town.

Ulyanovsk is served by the Ulyanovsk Vostochny Airport (the international airport) in the left-bank part of the city and Ulyanovsk Baratayevka Airport (Ulyanovsk Central Airport) in the right-bank part of the city.

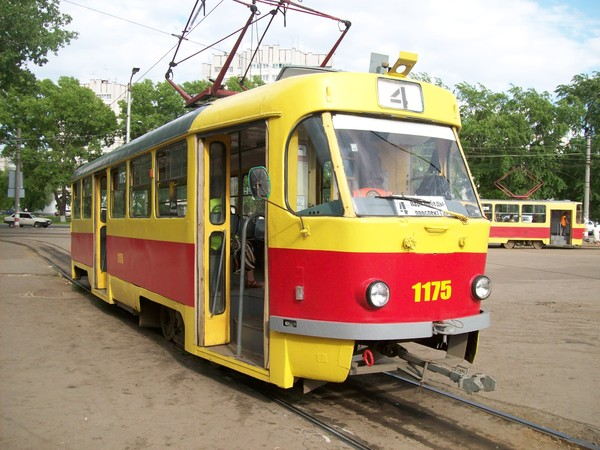
Retro Tatra T3 Tram

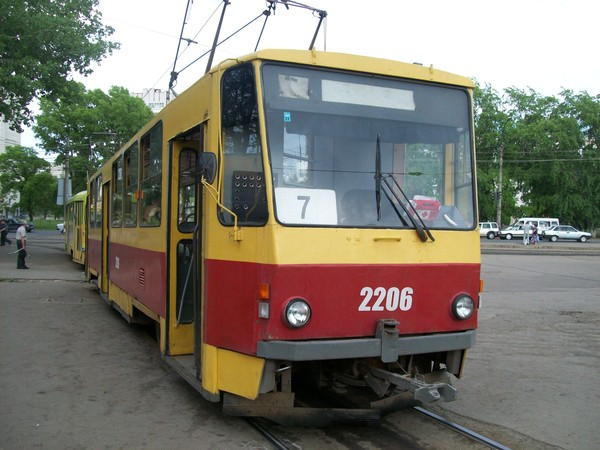
Newer Tatra T6B5 Tram

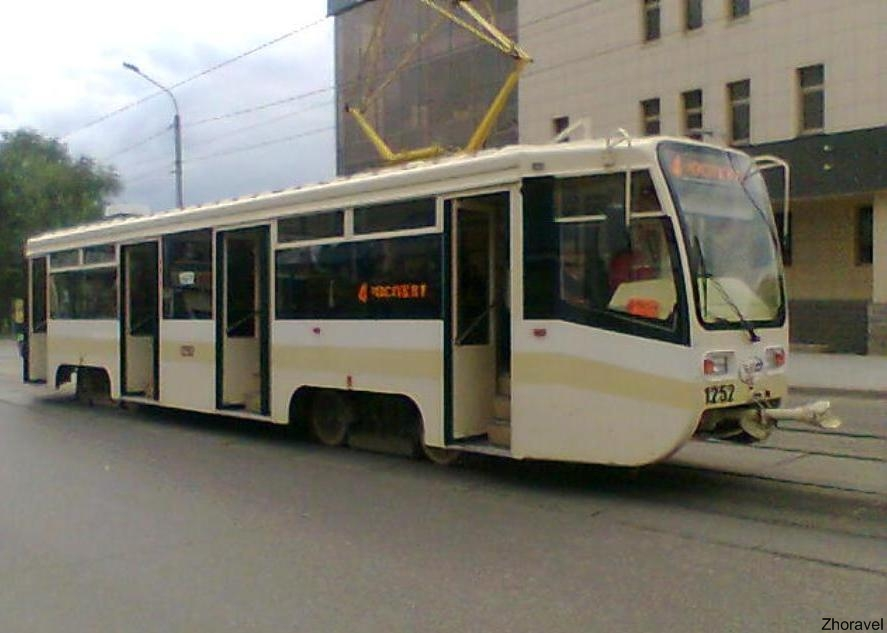
Upgraded KTM-19 Tram

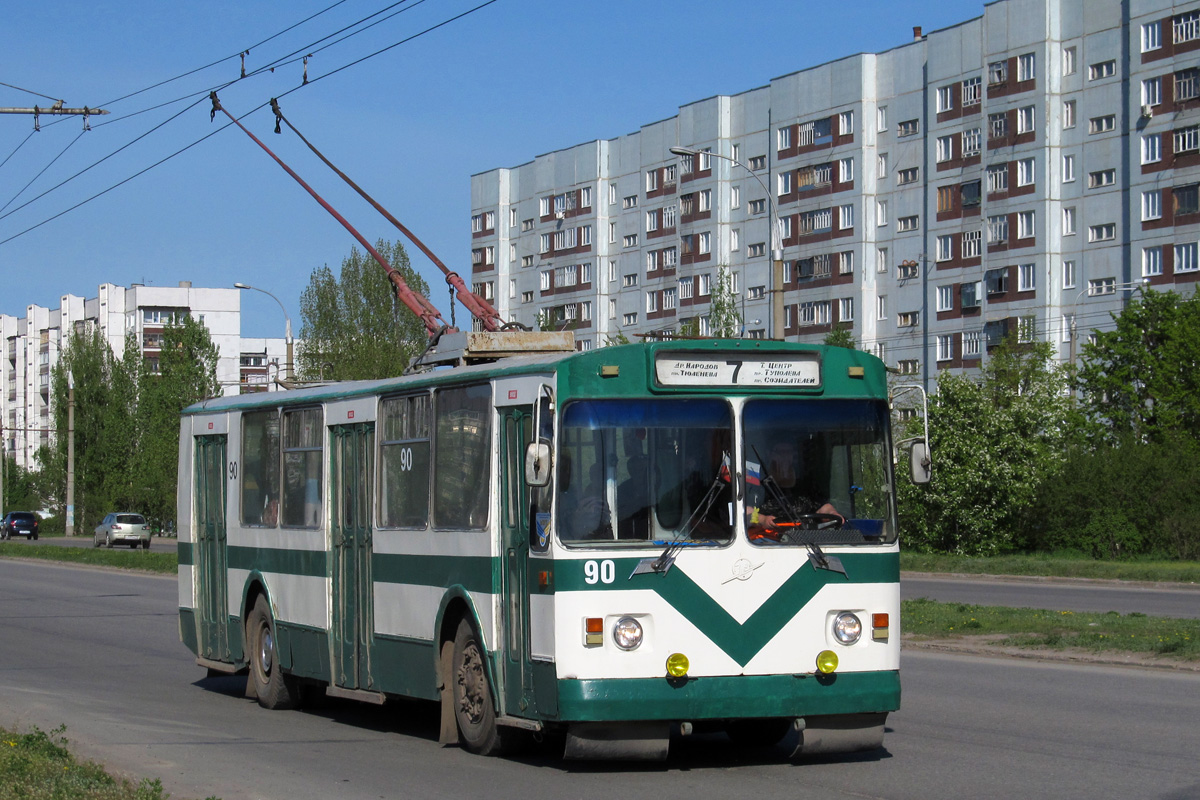
Trolleybus ZiU-9

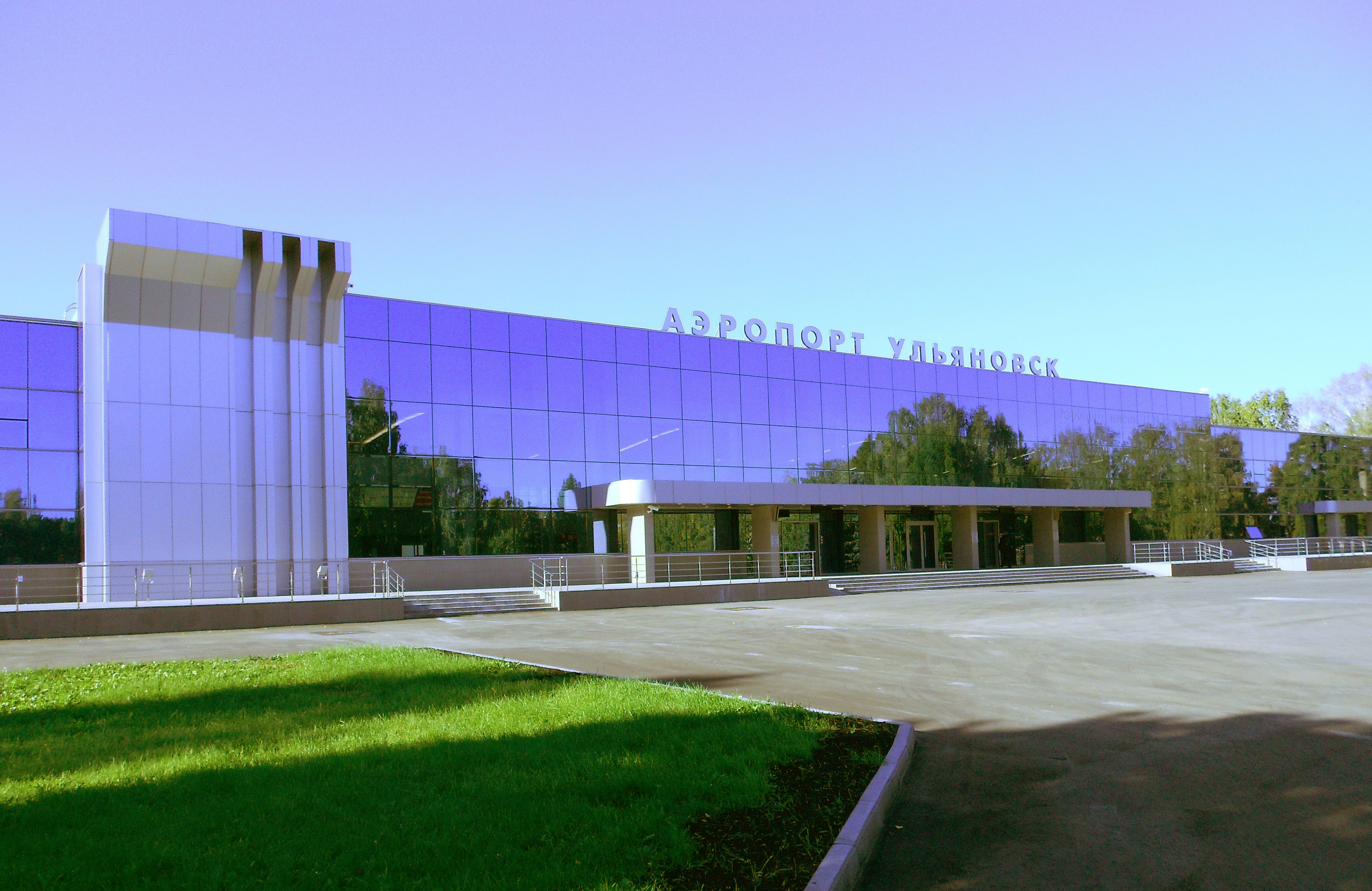
Ulyanovsk Central Airport, major airport, primarily for domestic flights

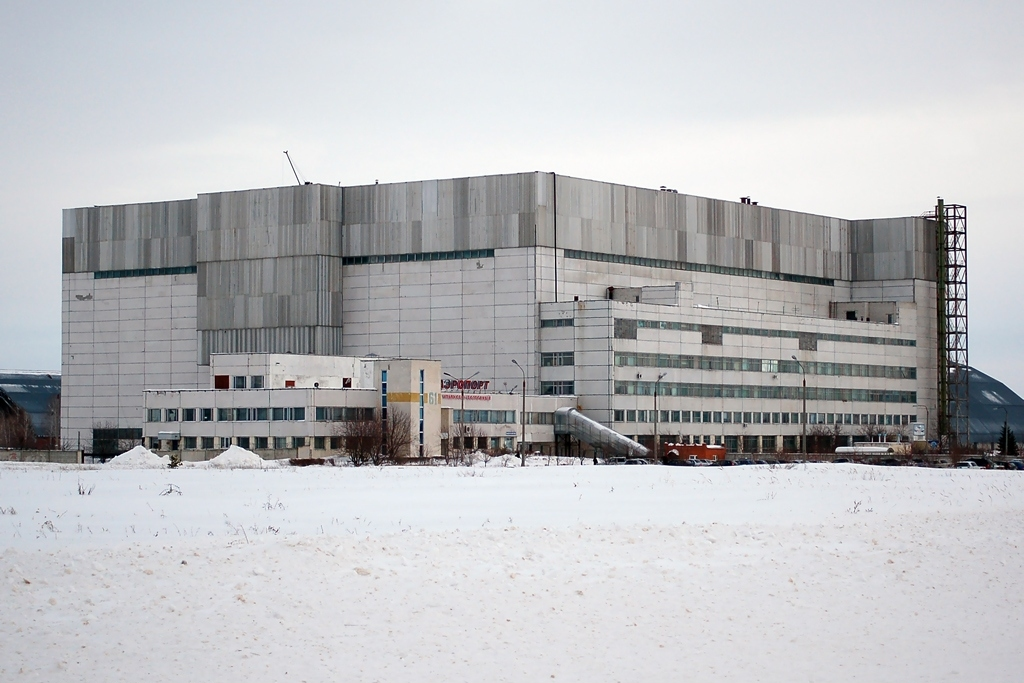
Ulyanovsk Vostochny Airport, Cargo Terminal

== Education ==
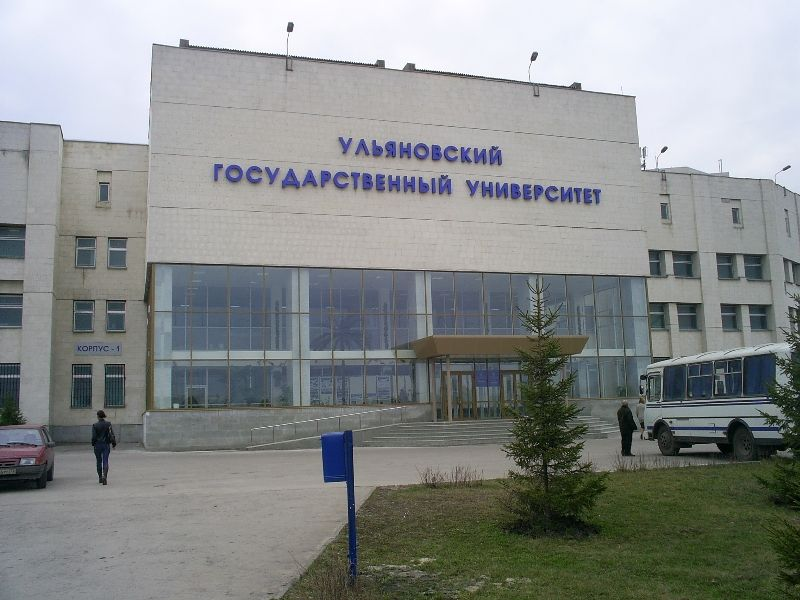
Ulyanovsk State University

- Ulyanovsk State University, established in 1988 as a branch of Moscow State University. At the present time, UlSU is one of the largest higher educational institutions in the Volga region, comprising 6 institutes, 6 independent faculties, 2 affiliates, 5 junior colleges, 6 learning centers. UlSU enrolls about 15 thousand students annually, among them 125 foreign citizens from 20 countries of the world.
- Ulyanovsk State Technical University, established in 1957 as Ulyanovsk Polytech University. Today Ulyanovsk State Technical University features over 14,000 students on different education programs at 10 faculties and 48 departments.
- Ulyanovsk State Pedagogical University, established in 1932.
- Ulyanovsk State Agricultural Academy, established in 1943.
- Ulyanovsk Higher Civil Aviation School, founded in 1935 as a training center, designed for training and retraining of flight crews of civil aircraft. In 1992, raised its status to the present. Has branches in Krasny Kut, Saratov Oblast and Sasovo, Ryazan Oblast. When it has Main industry museum of civil aviation history (Ulyanovsk aircraft museum), established in 1983.

There is also a large number of technical and medical community colleges in Ulyanovsk.

== Architecture ==
During the Soviet period, Ulyanovsk lost much of its historical heritage due to both neglect and intentional destruction. All traces of the original wooden fort have disappeared, as have the churches of old Simbirsk; the majority of 19th-century buildings remain in the city, including the houses where Lenin lived between 1870 and 1887. The restoration of the Cathedral of the Holy Trinity was considered, but has since been canceled. However, many historical constructions remain. Among them the house in which writer Ivan Goncharov was born, the Protestant church and other buildings.

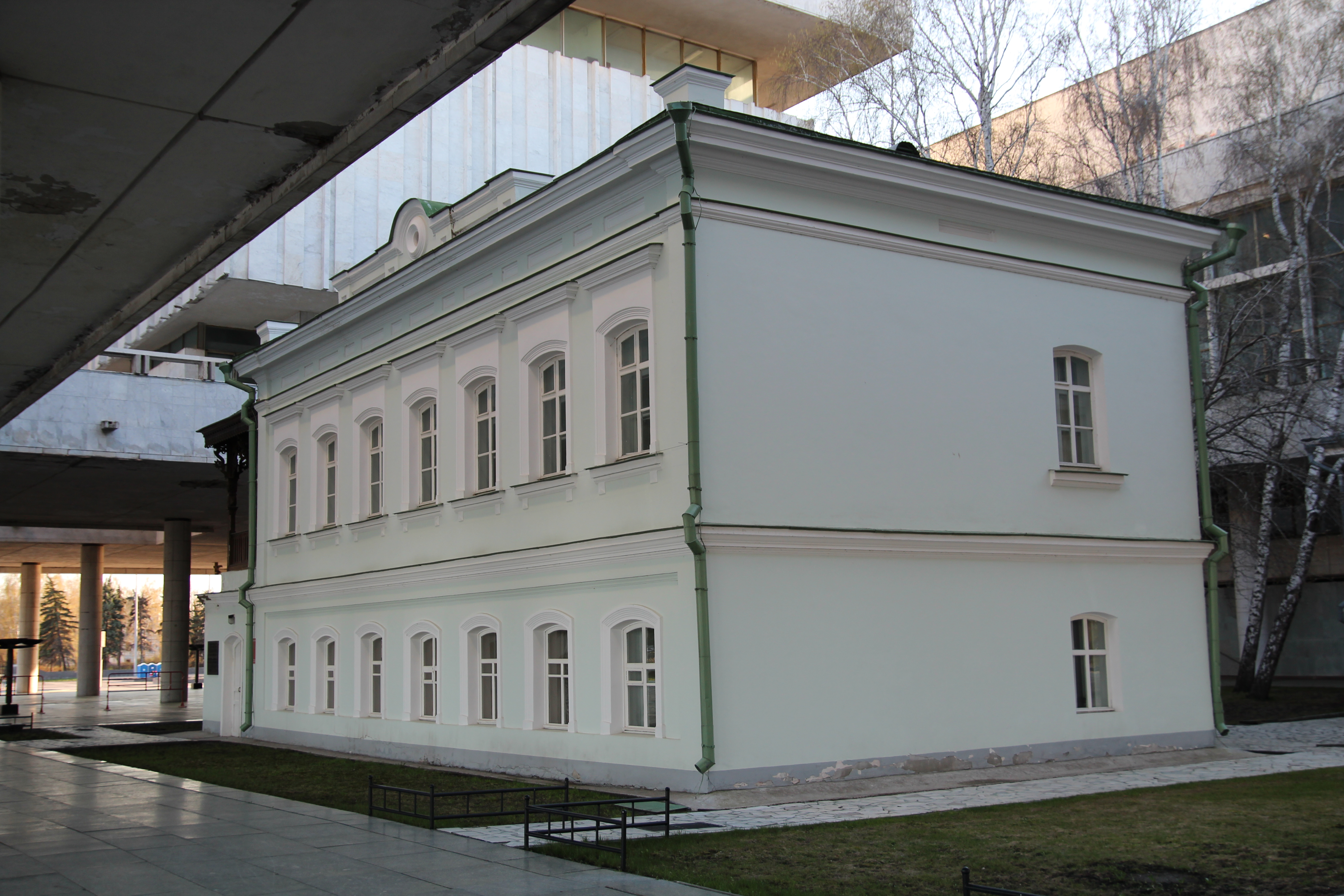
The house where Lenin was born

Ulyanovsk is home to several tourist destinations around the downtown museum district and famous Volga River tours. The Ulyanovsk State historical memorial complex "Lenin`s hometown" houses the regional city center, the center of Simbirsk-Ulyanovsk. The memorial estate has been recreating the local culture connected with architecture, education and way of life of Russia since the end of the 19th century until the beginning of the 20th century. The State historical memorial complex "Lenin`s hometown" was founded in 1984. Now it consists of 14 museums and the Showroom, and has a young creative collective of 152 people.

== Sports ==
Volga plays in the Russian Bandy Super League. Volga-2 plays in the 2nd division. An indoor arena for bandy, Volga-Sport-Arena, opened in 2014, as one of the first in Russia. It has a capacity of 5 000. The Bandy World Championship 2016 was played in Ulyanovsk and nearby Dimitrovgrad. The Youth-17 Bandy World Championship will be hosted by Ulyanovsk in 2018.

In association football, FC Volga plays in "Urals-Volga" zone of the Russian Second Division (2016–2017 season).

Ulyanovsk also hosted matches of the first qualifying round UEFA Women's Under-17 Championship 2014. Matches were held at Trud Stadium in the downtown Ulyanovsk.

In 2017 "Trud" was closed for reconstruction.

In 2017 the first CIS festival for national sports and games, Фестиваль национальных видов спорта и игр государств — участников Содружества Независимых Государств, was held in Ulyanovsk. The main sports were sambo, tug of war, mas-wrestling, gorodki, belt wrestling, lapta, bandy (rink), kettlebell lifting, chess and archery. A few demonstration sports were also a part of the programme.

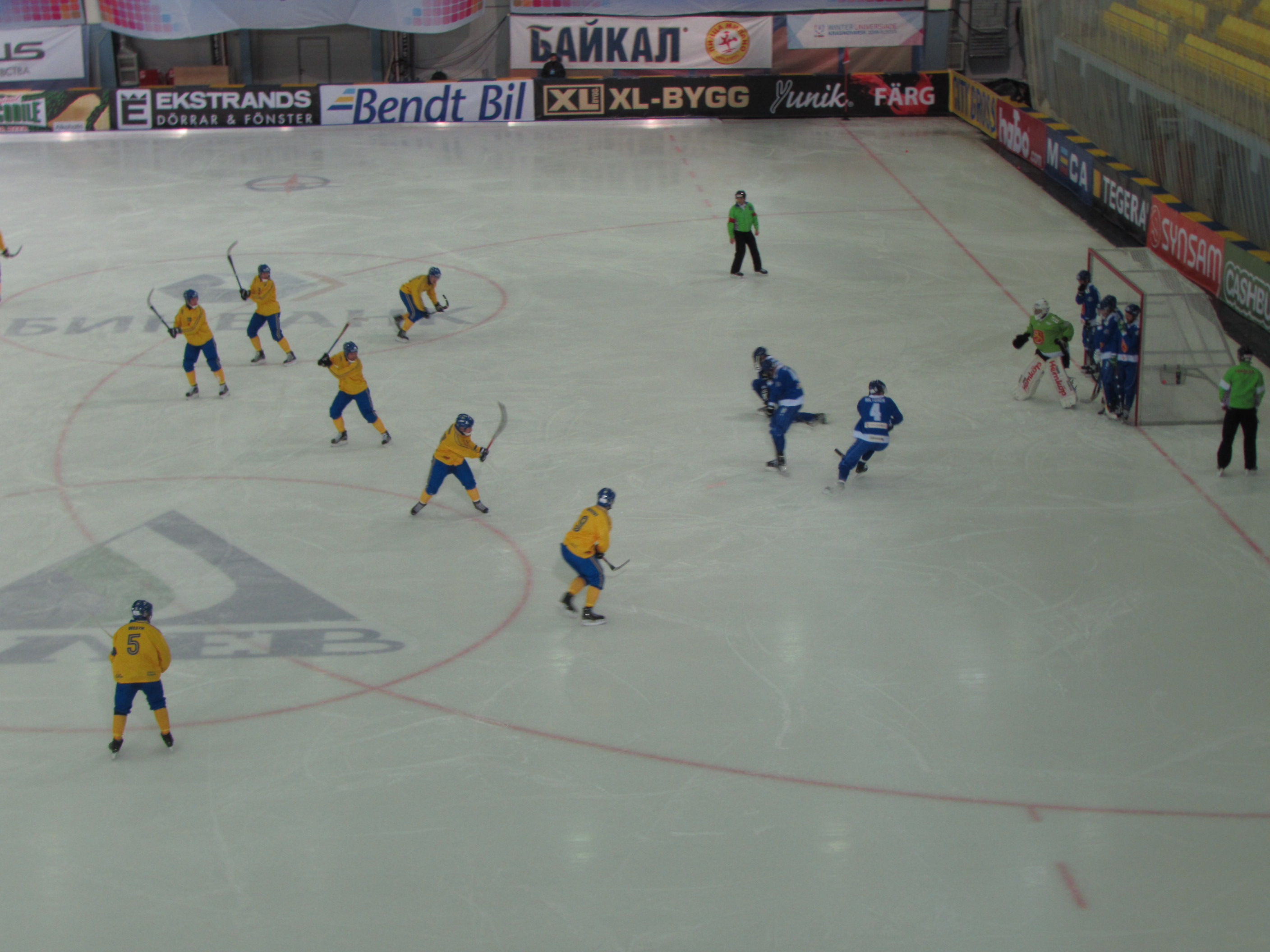
Finland-Sweden in Volga-Sport-Arena

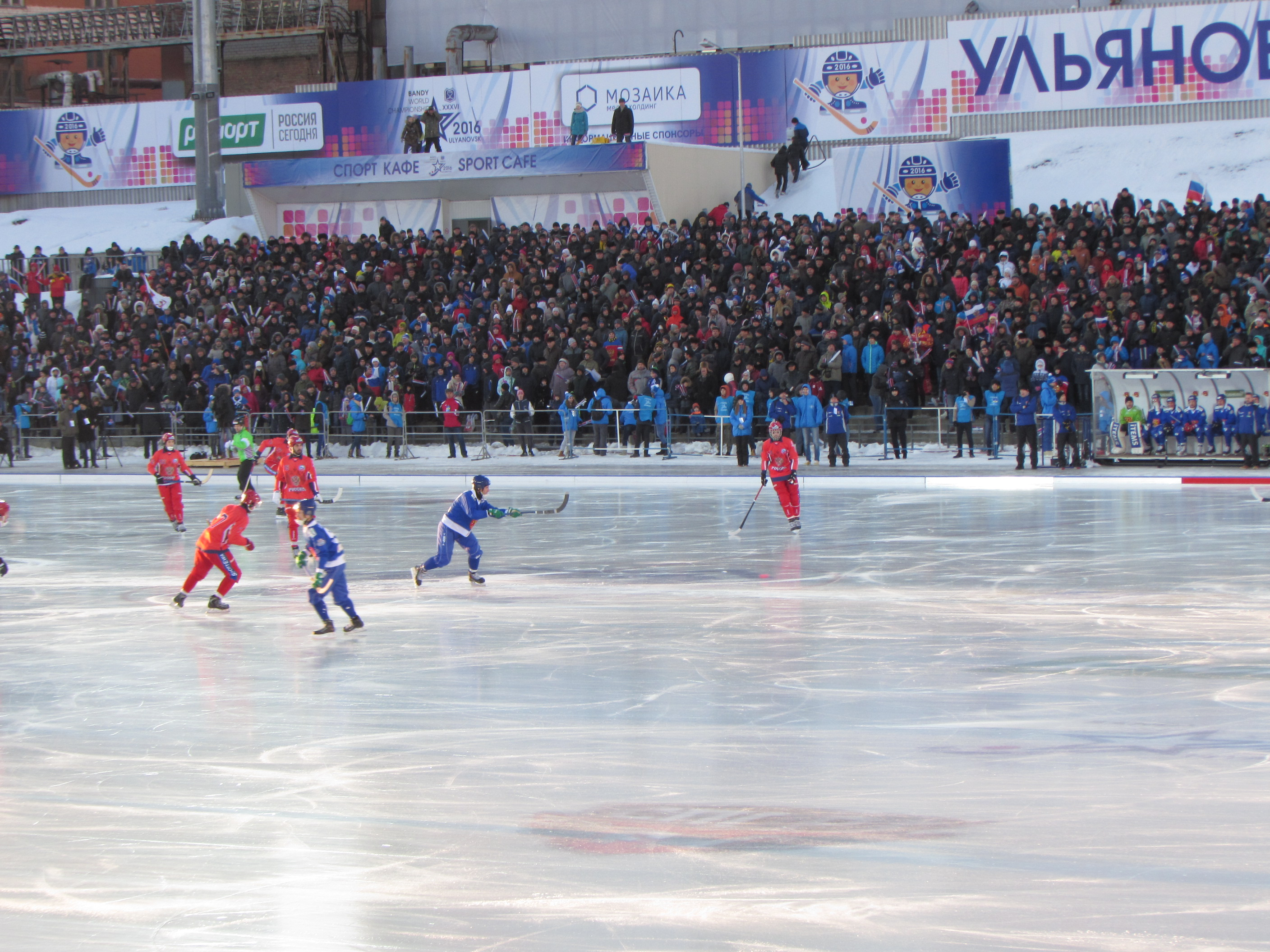
The Bandy World Championship 2016 final at Trud Stadium

== Notable people ==
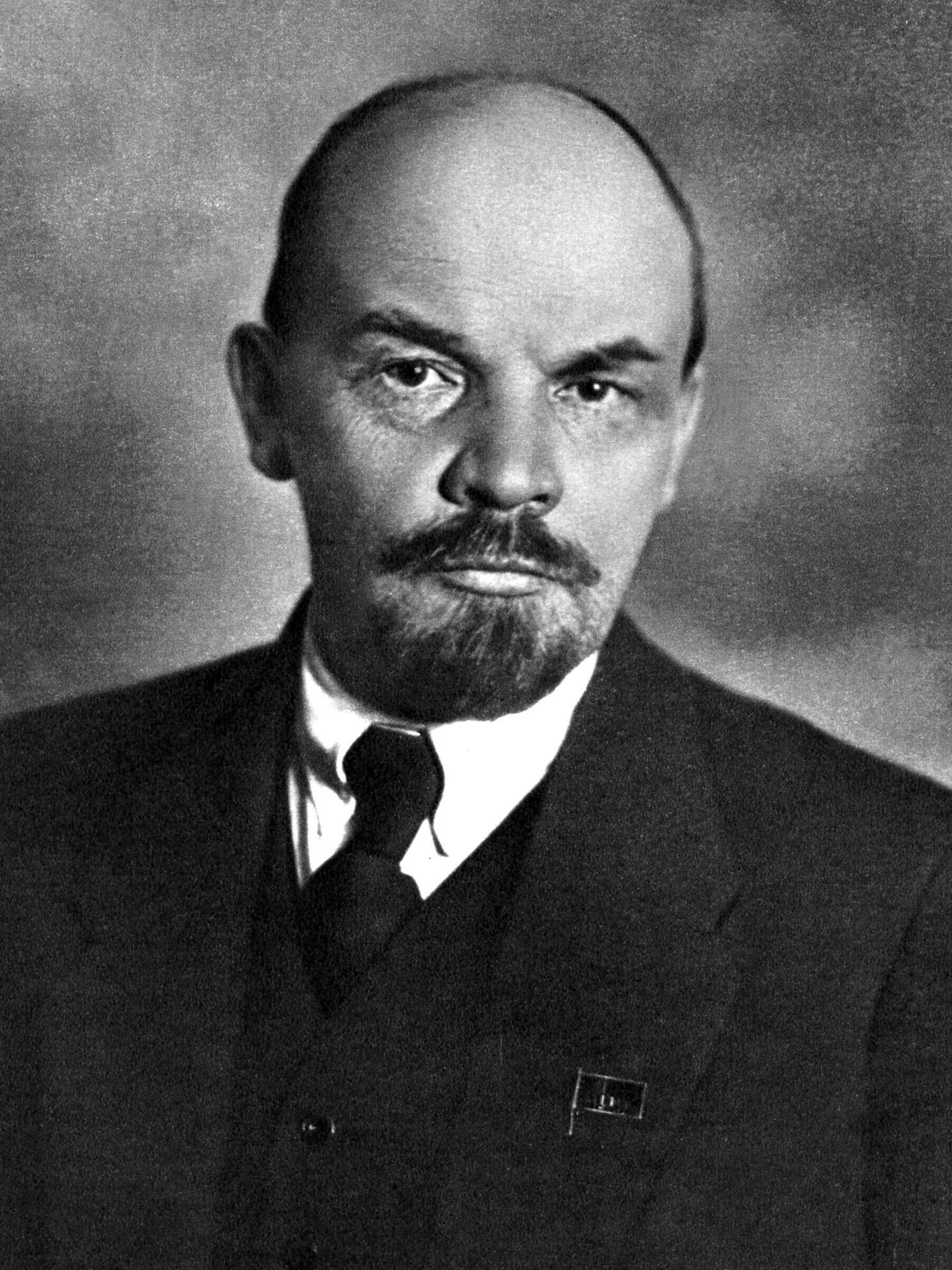
Vladimir Lenin

- Vladimir Lenin (1870–1924), communist revolutionary and first premier of the Russian SFSR and the Soviet Union
- Ilya Ulyanov (1831–1886), public figure on public education and teacher
- Ivan Goncharov (1812–1891), novelist and author of Oblomov
- Nikolay Karamzin (1766–1826), writer, poet, historian, and critic
- Nikolay Yazykov (1803–1846), poet
- Andrey Sakharov (1921–1989), nuclear physicist, dissident, and human rights activist
- Alexander Kerensky (1881–1970), 2nd Prime Minister of the Russian Provisional Government
- Alexander Protopopov (1866–1918), last Interior Minister of the Russian Empire 1916-1917
- Pyotr Chardynin (1873–1934), movie director
- Yusuf Akçura (1876–1935), historian, writer, politician, member of Turkish nationalist movement
- Ludmila Belousova (1935–2017), figure skater and two times Winter Olympics champion
- Raphael Zon (1874–1956), U.S. Forest Service researcher
- Paweł Jasienica (1909–1970), historian, journalist. and soldier for the Polish Army in World War II
- Stanislav Zhuk (1935–1998), figure skater and coach
- Nikas Safronov (1956) artist
- Ivan Ozhogin (1978), musical and opera singer

== Twin towns – sister cities ==
Ulyanovsk is twinned with:

- Changsha, China
- Feodosia, Crimea
- Gomel, Belarus
- Jincheng, China
- Krefeld, Germany
- Macon, United States
- Minsk, Belarus
- formerly Oklahoma City, United States
- Shenzhen, China
- Wuhu, China
- Xiangtan, China

== Gallery ==
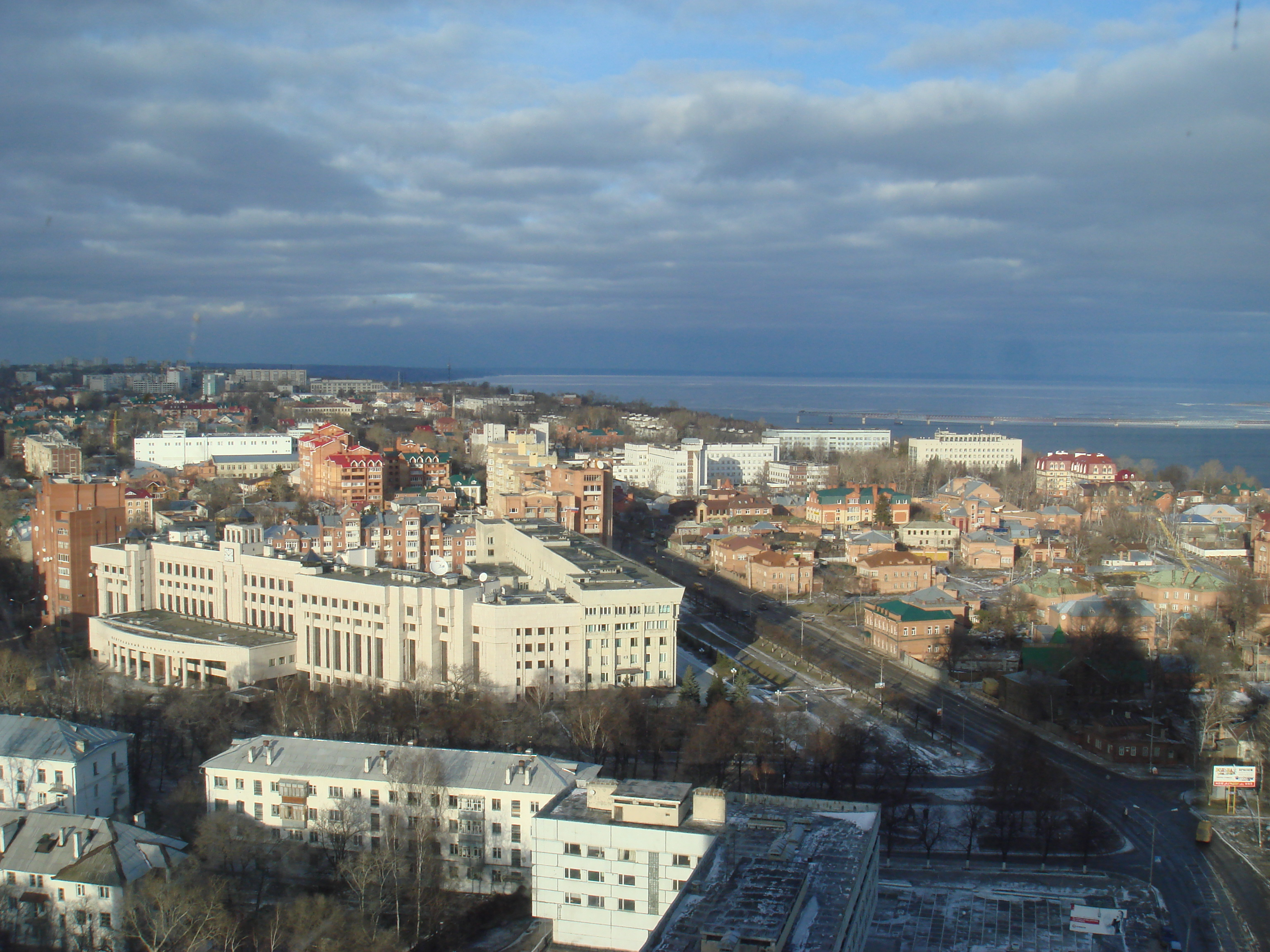
North view from the Hotel "Venets"

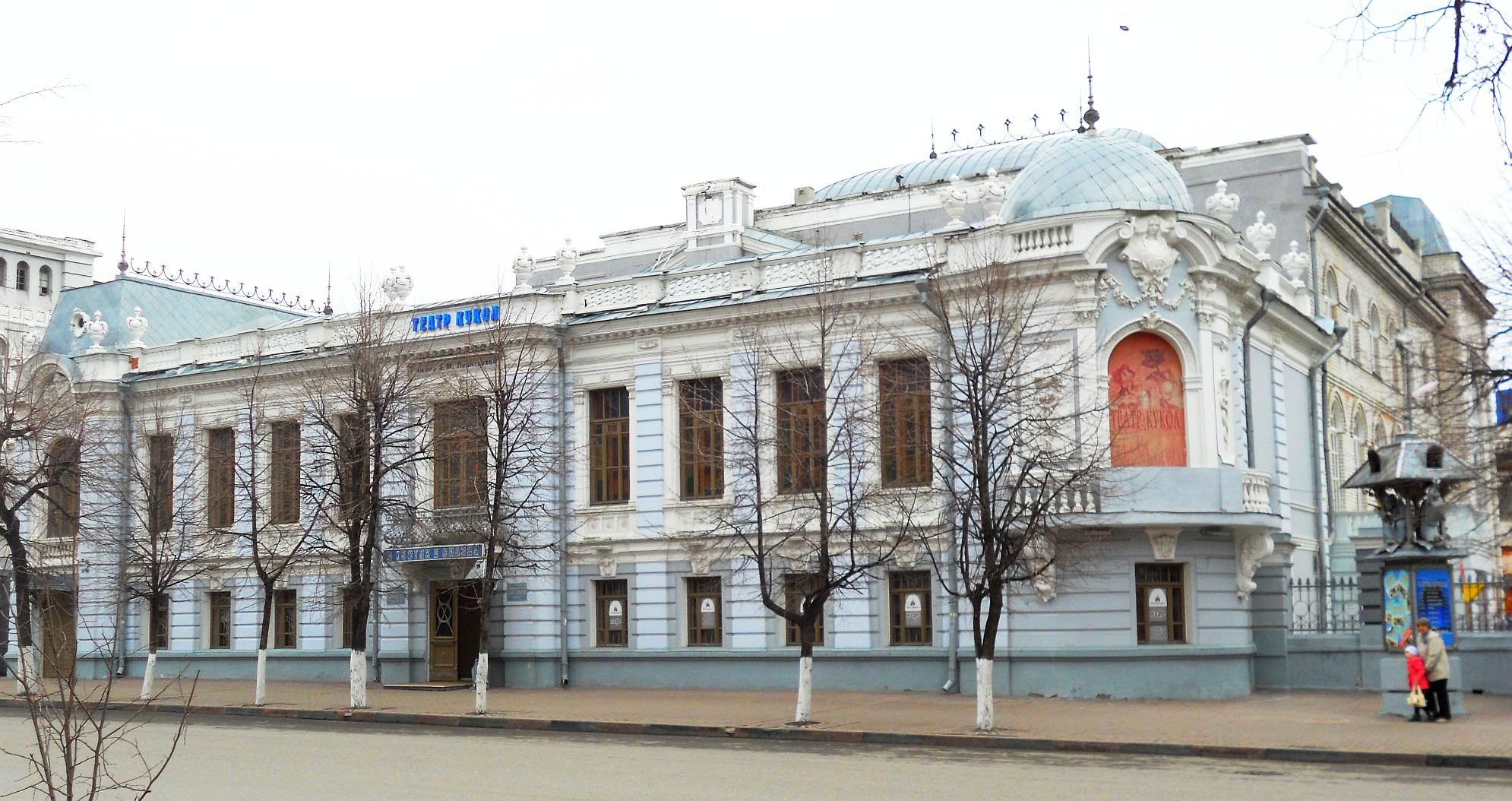
Ulyanovsk Puppet Show Theater

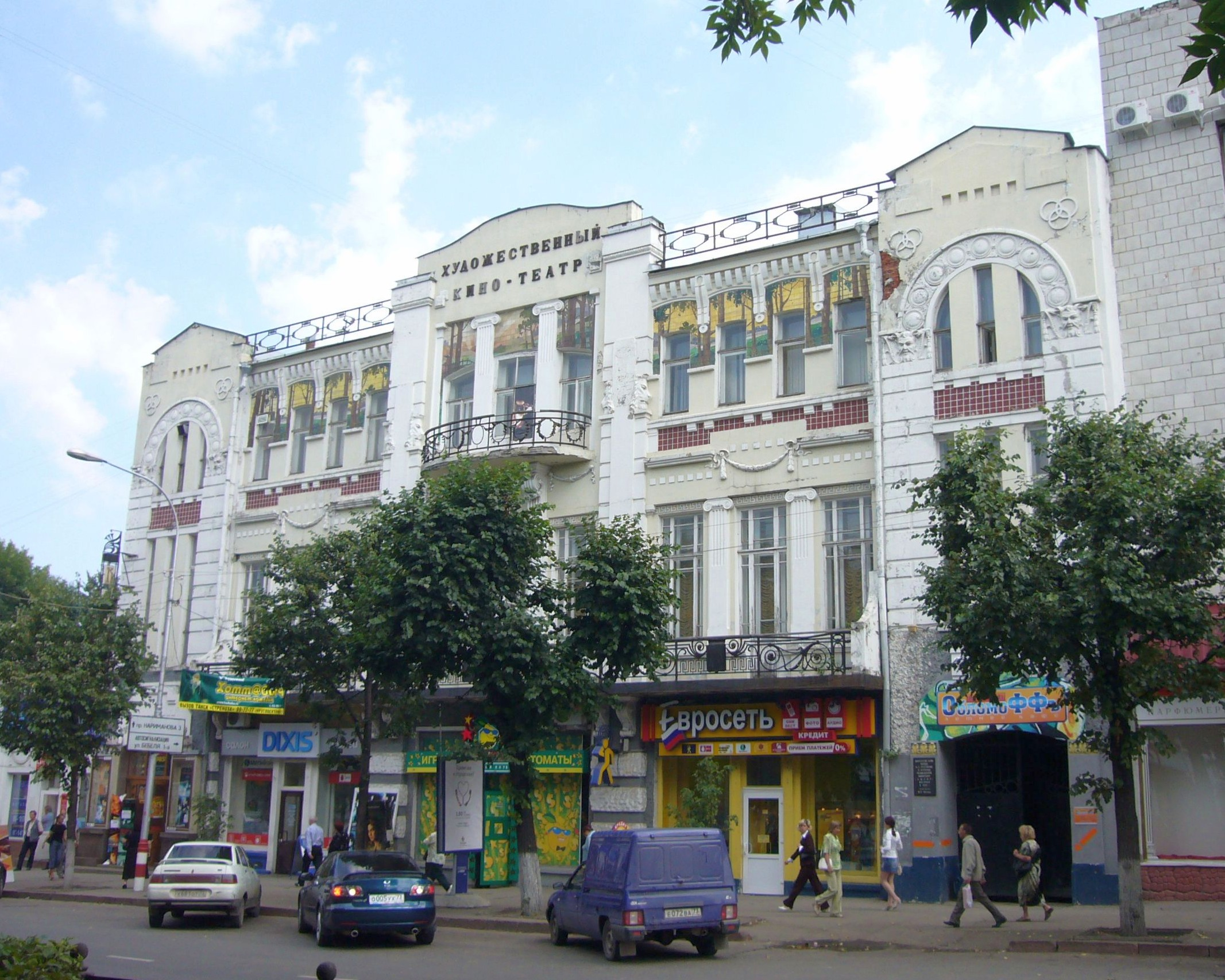
Cinema theater "Khudozestvennyi"

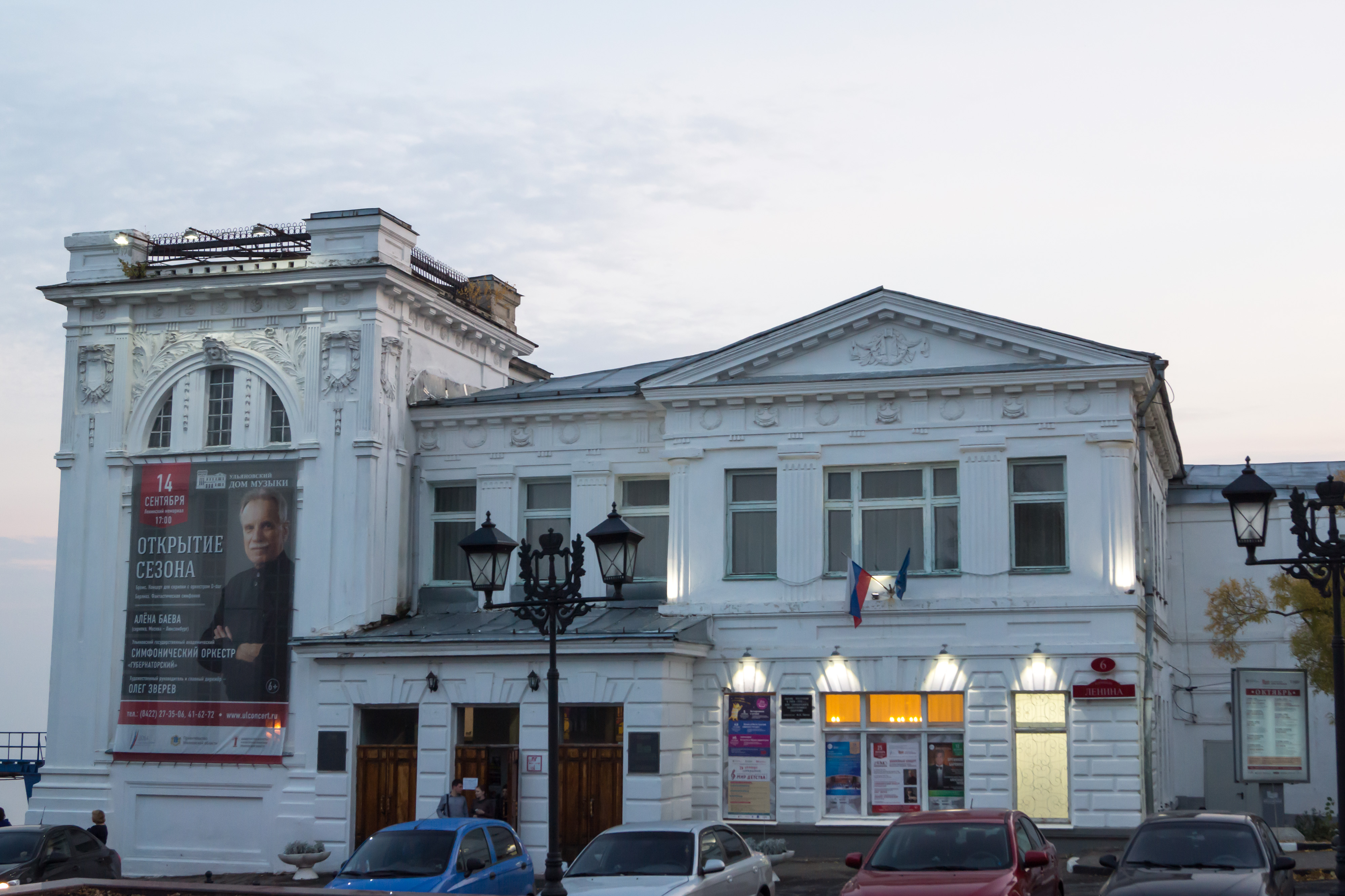
Ulyanovsk Symphony Orchestra

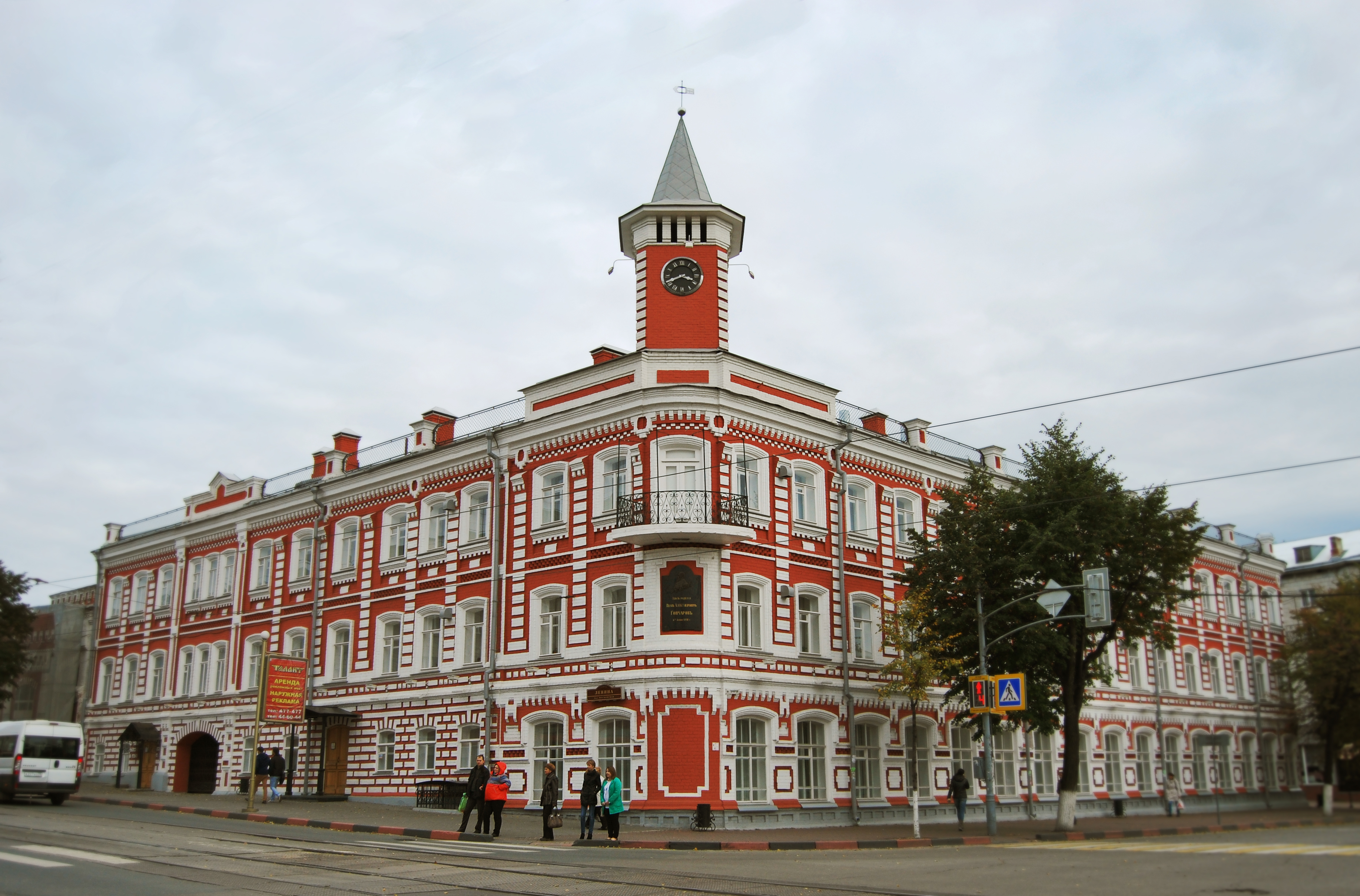
Museum of Ivan Goncharov

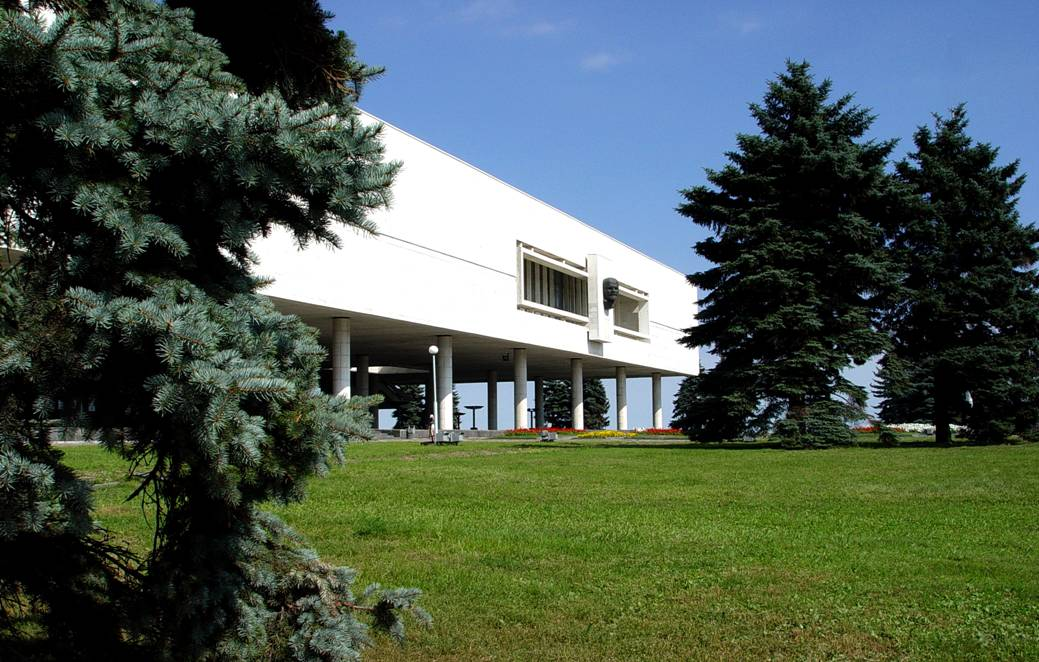
Memorial museum of Vladimir Lenin

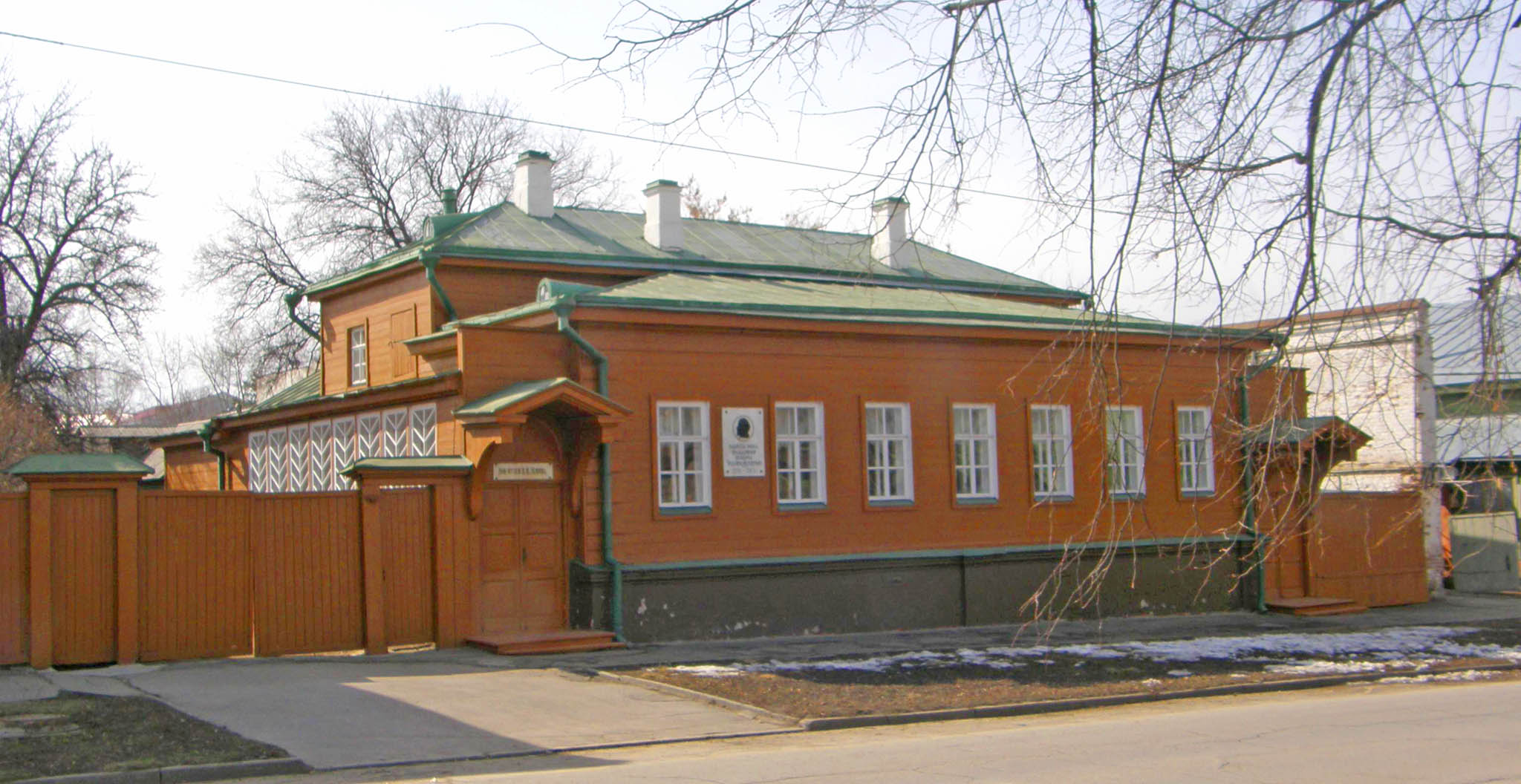
House of Vladimir Lenin and his family, where he was born, now Historical Museum

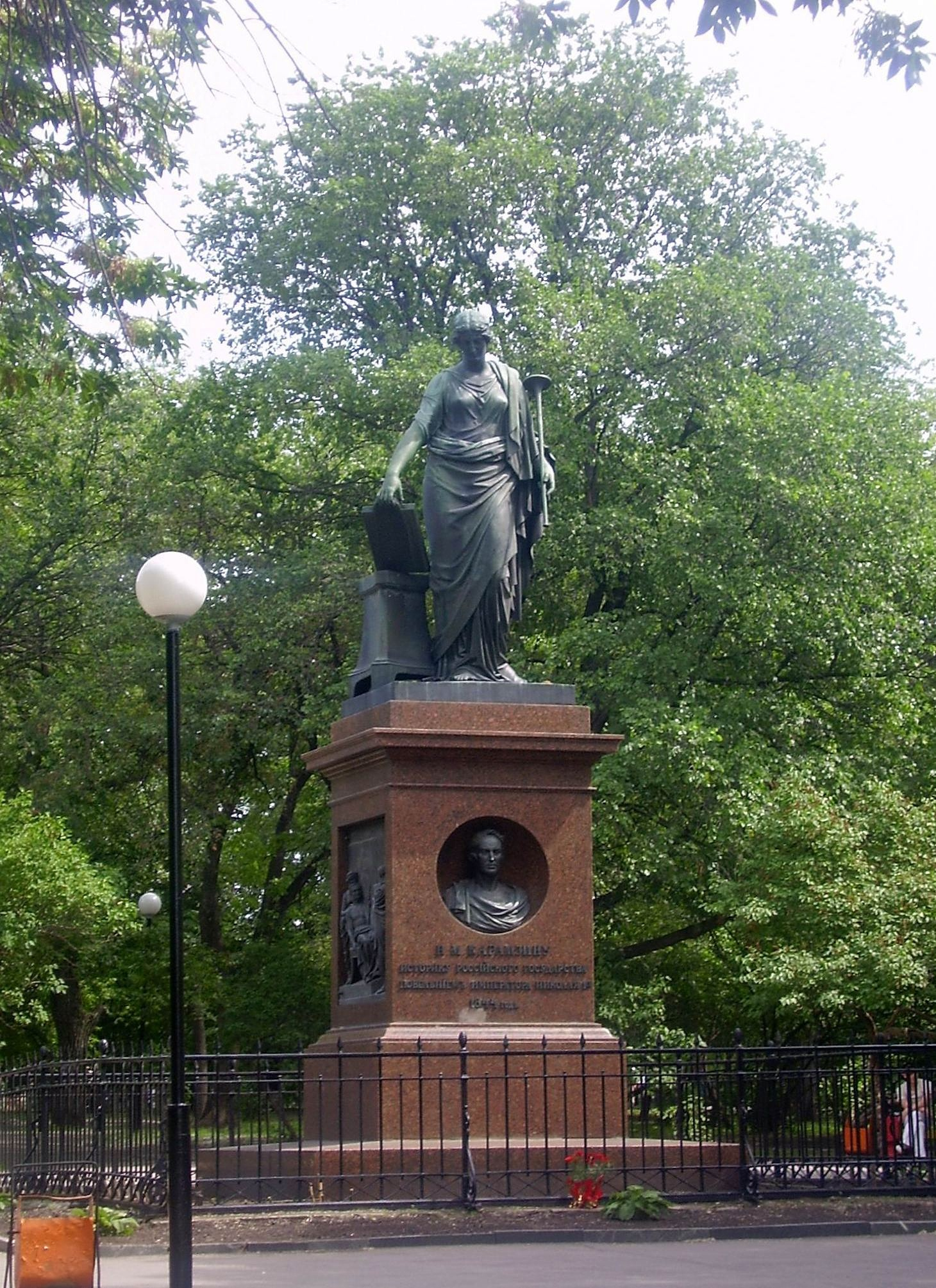
Monument to Nikolai Karamzin. Created by Samuil Halberg (Самуил Гальберг). Inaugurated August 22, 1845

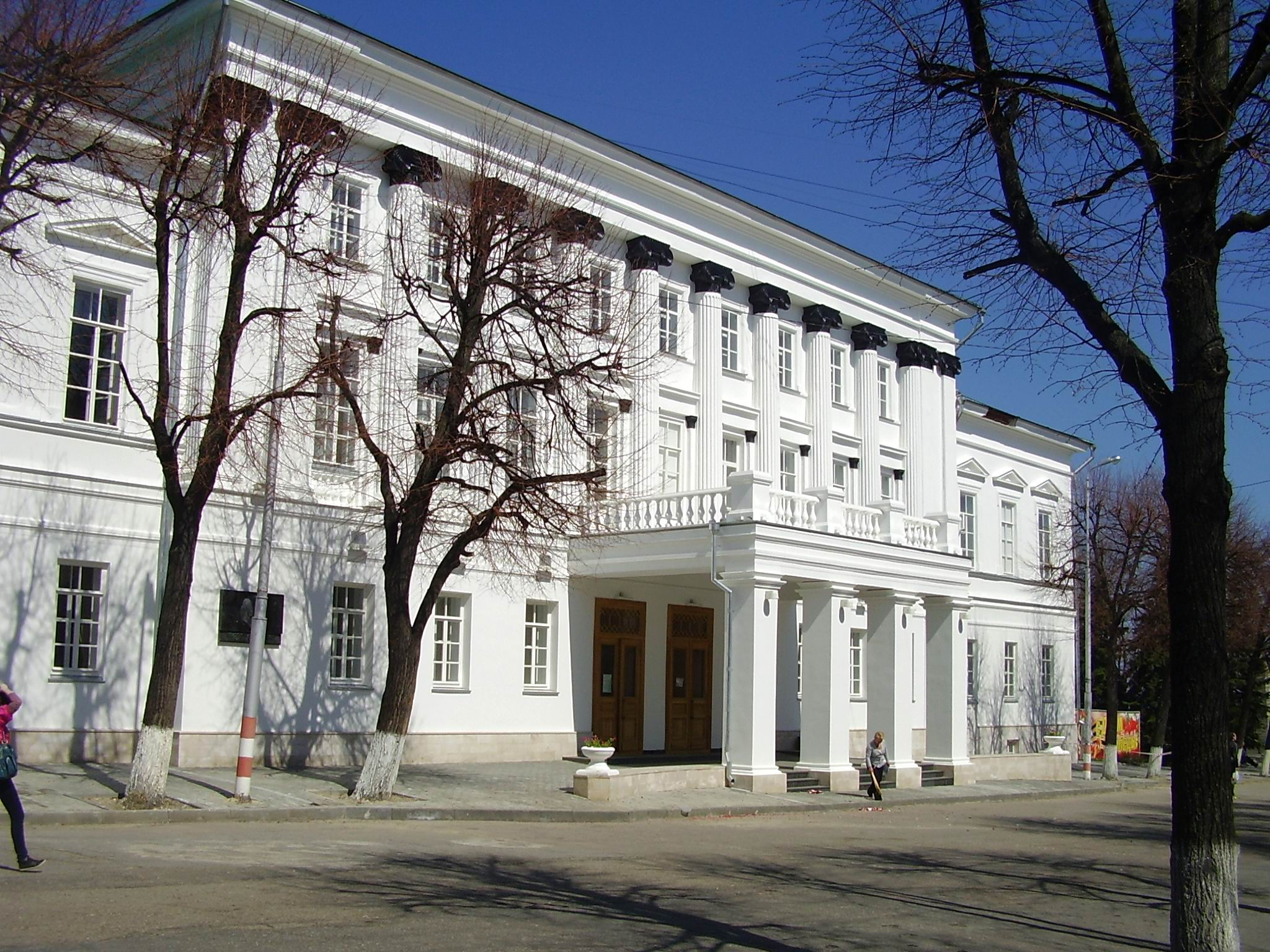
Karamzin State Library "Book Palace" – The old Simbirsk House of Nobility

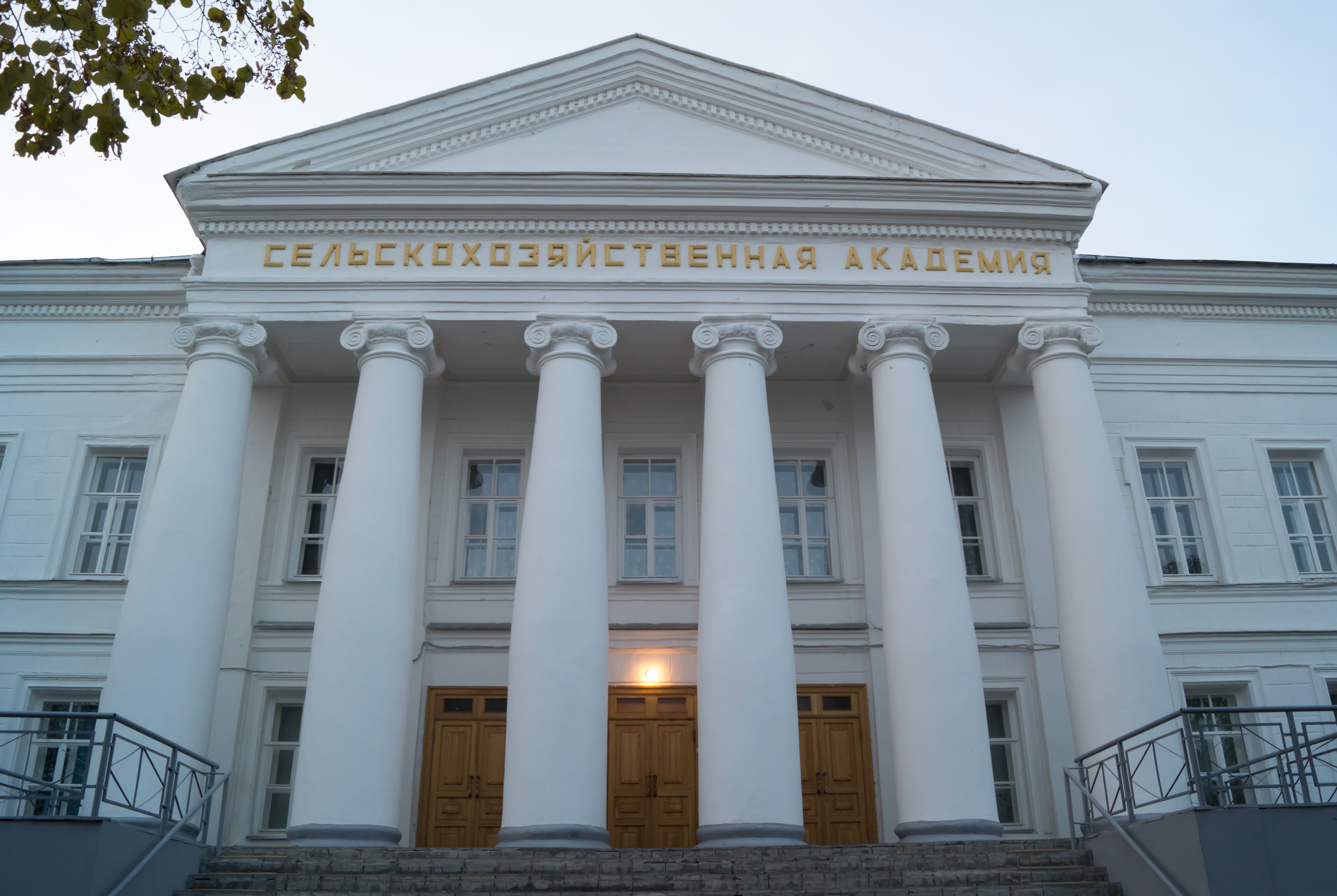
Ulyanovsk State Agricultural Academy

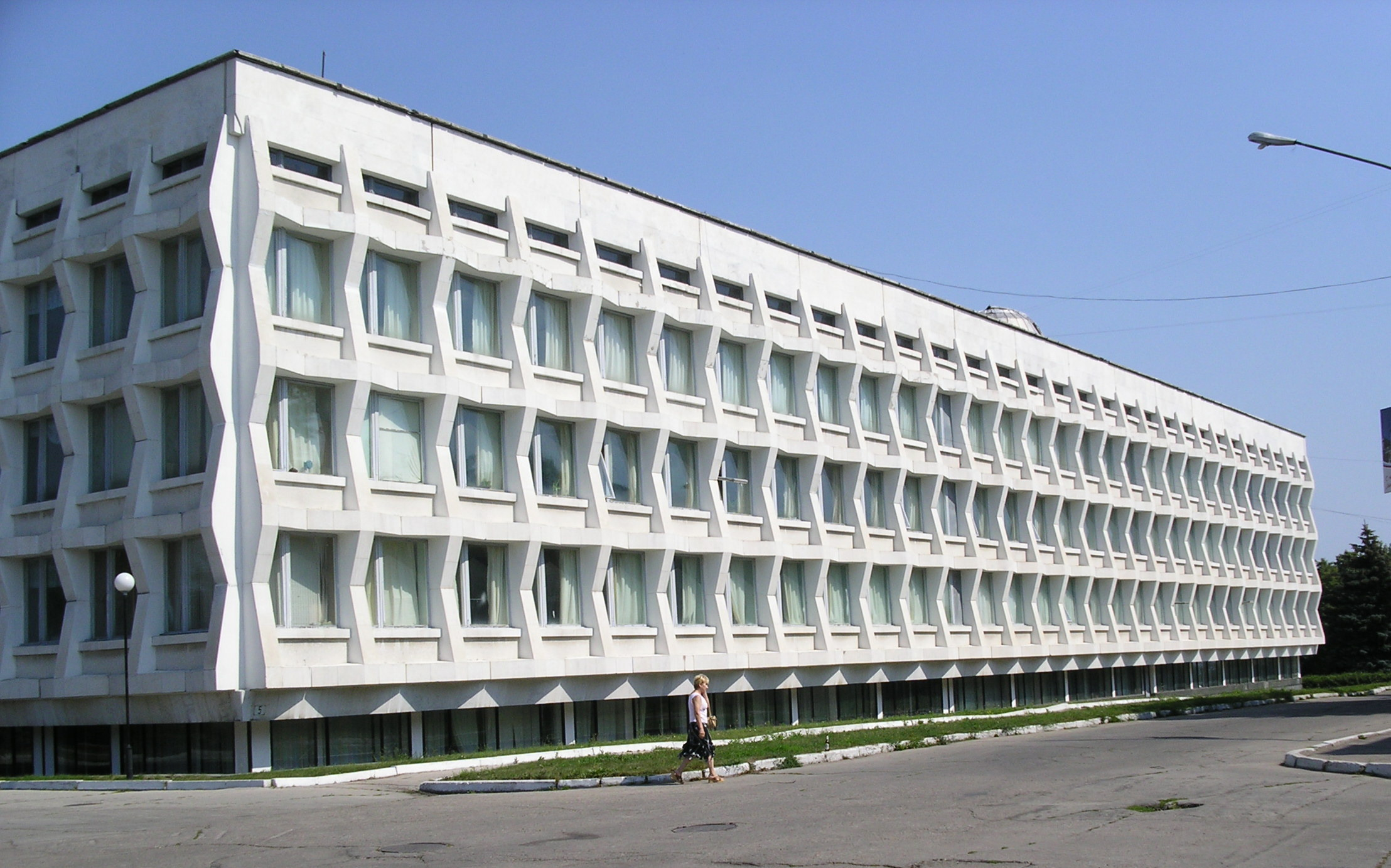
Ulyanovsk State Pedagogical University

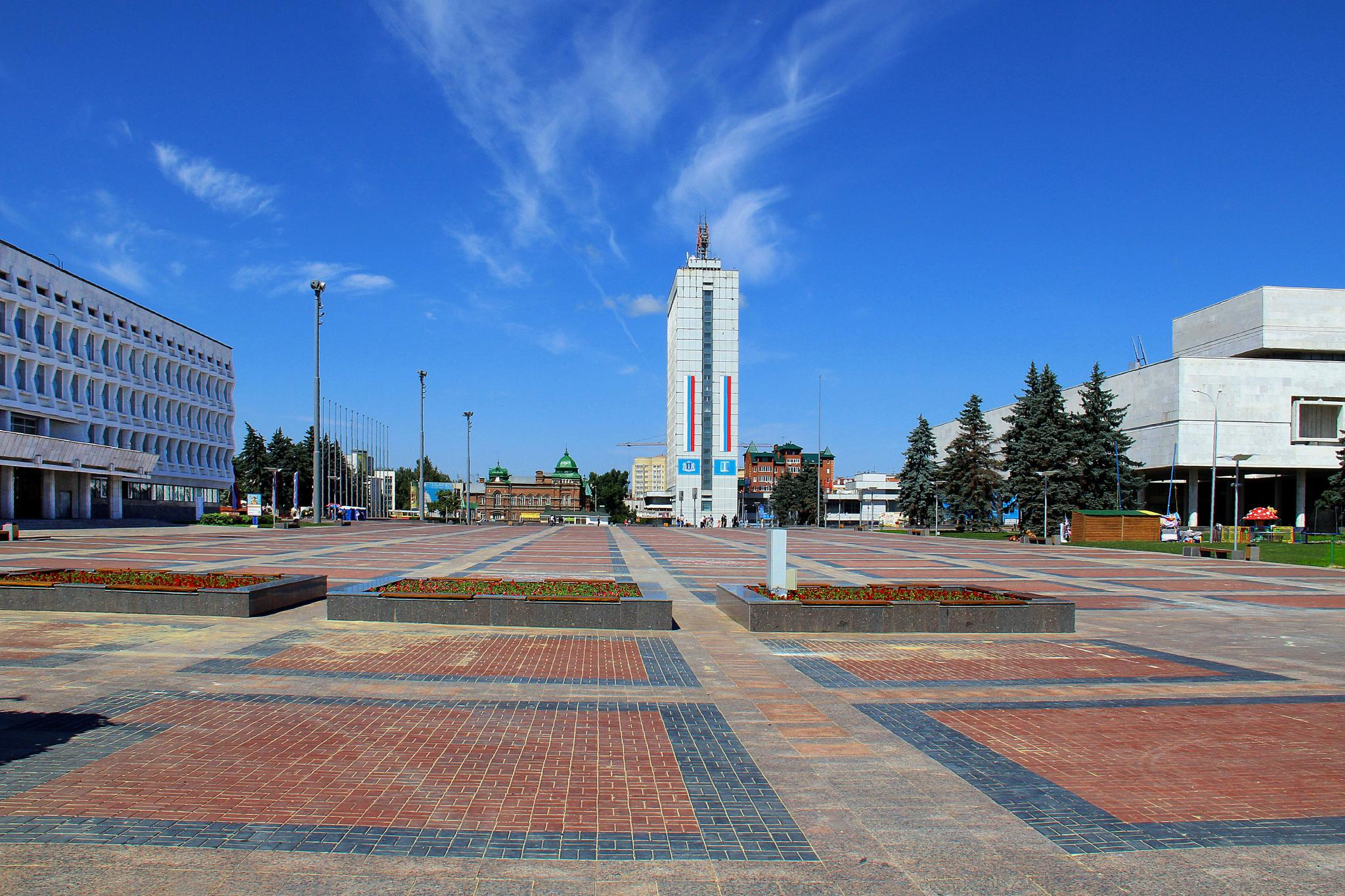
The square of the 100th anniversary of Vladimir Lenin

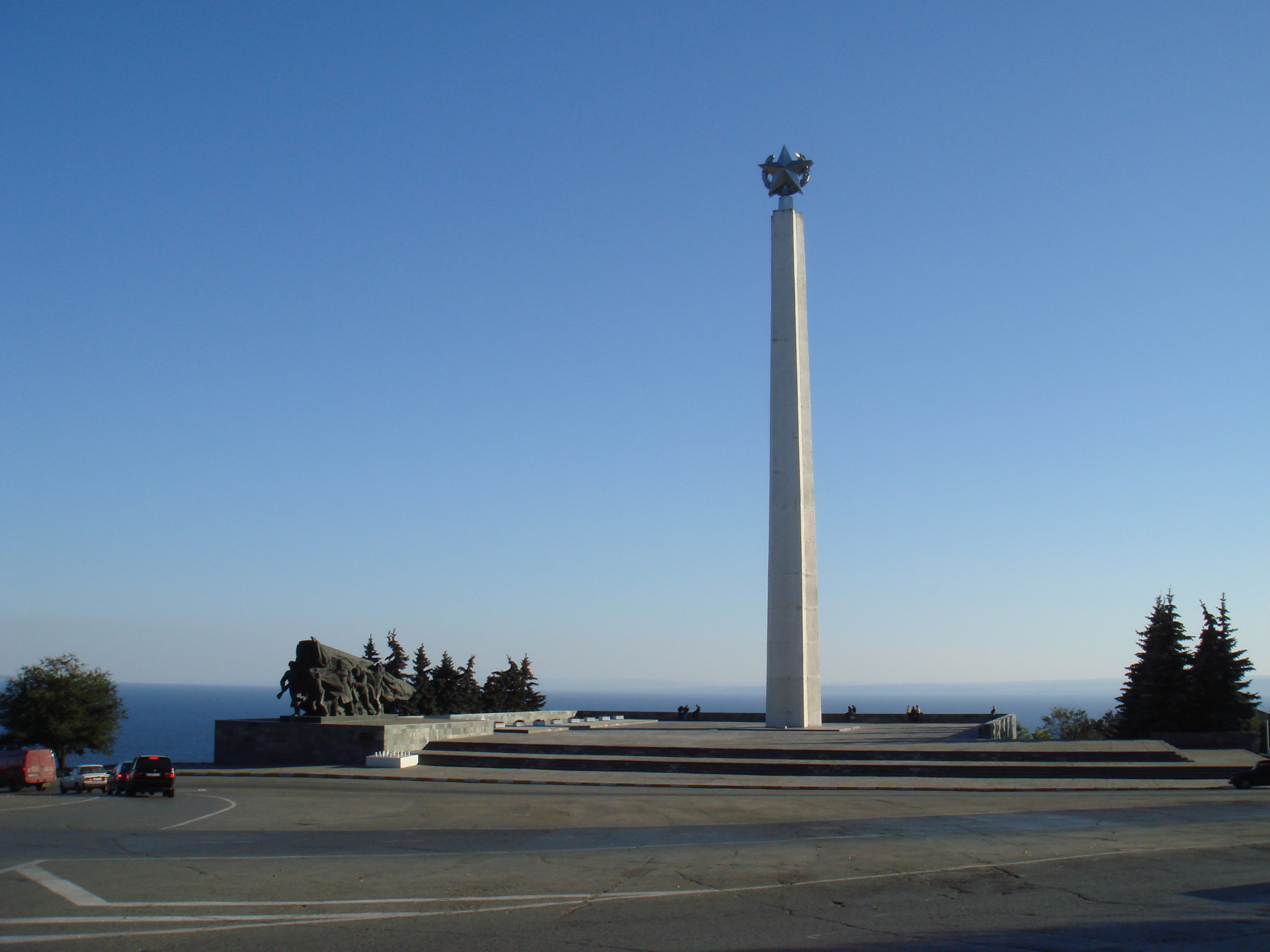
Obelisk and World War II Memorial on the banks of Volga River

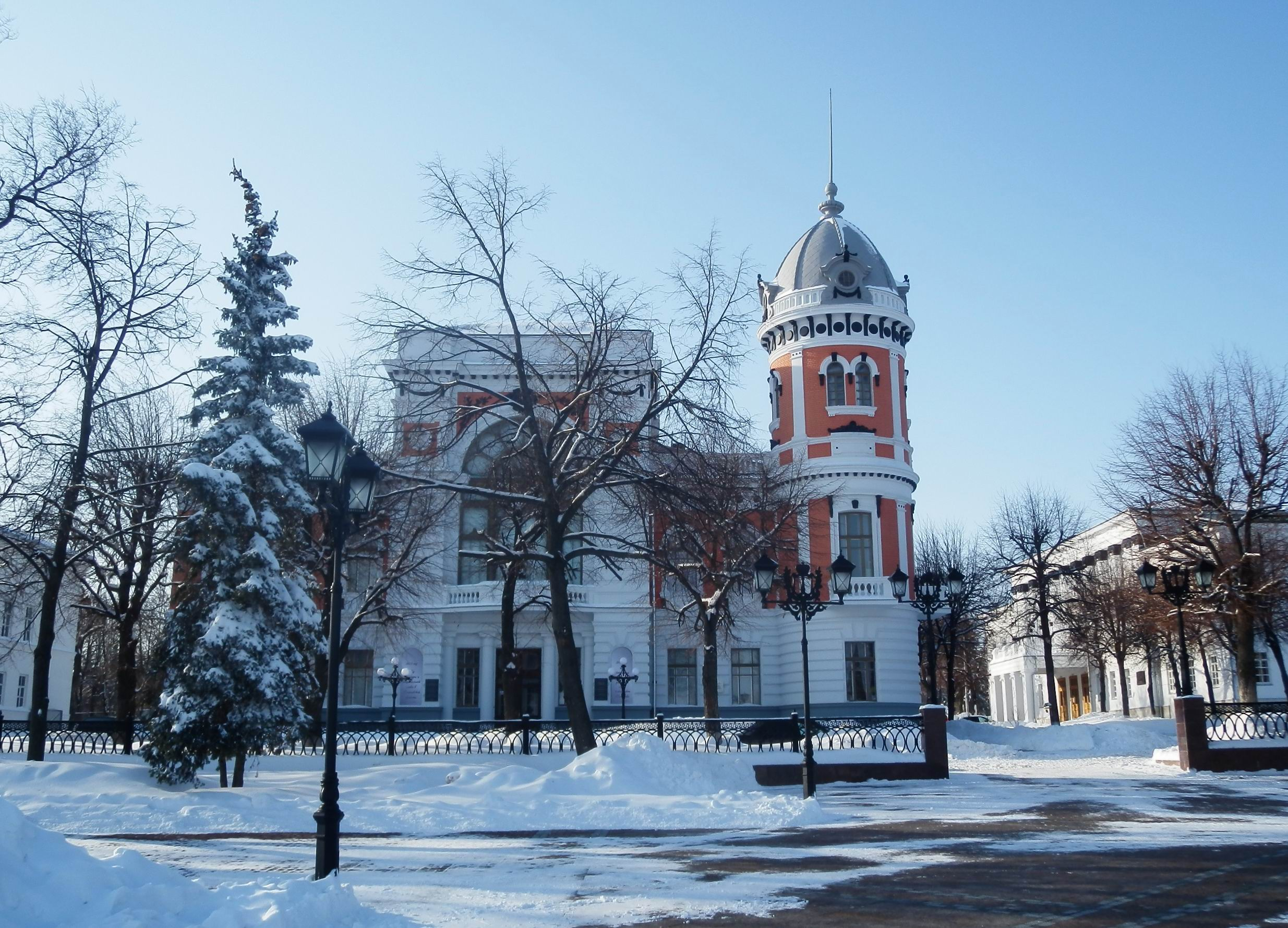
Museum of history and art during winter season. Building – an object of cultural heritage of the Russian Federation. Built in 1913–1916 years as a house-monument to the writer Ivan Goncharov who was born in Simbirsk

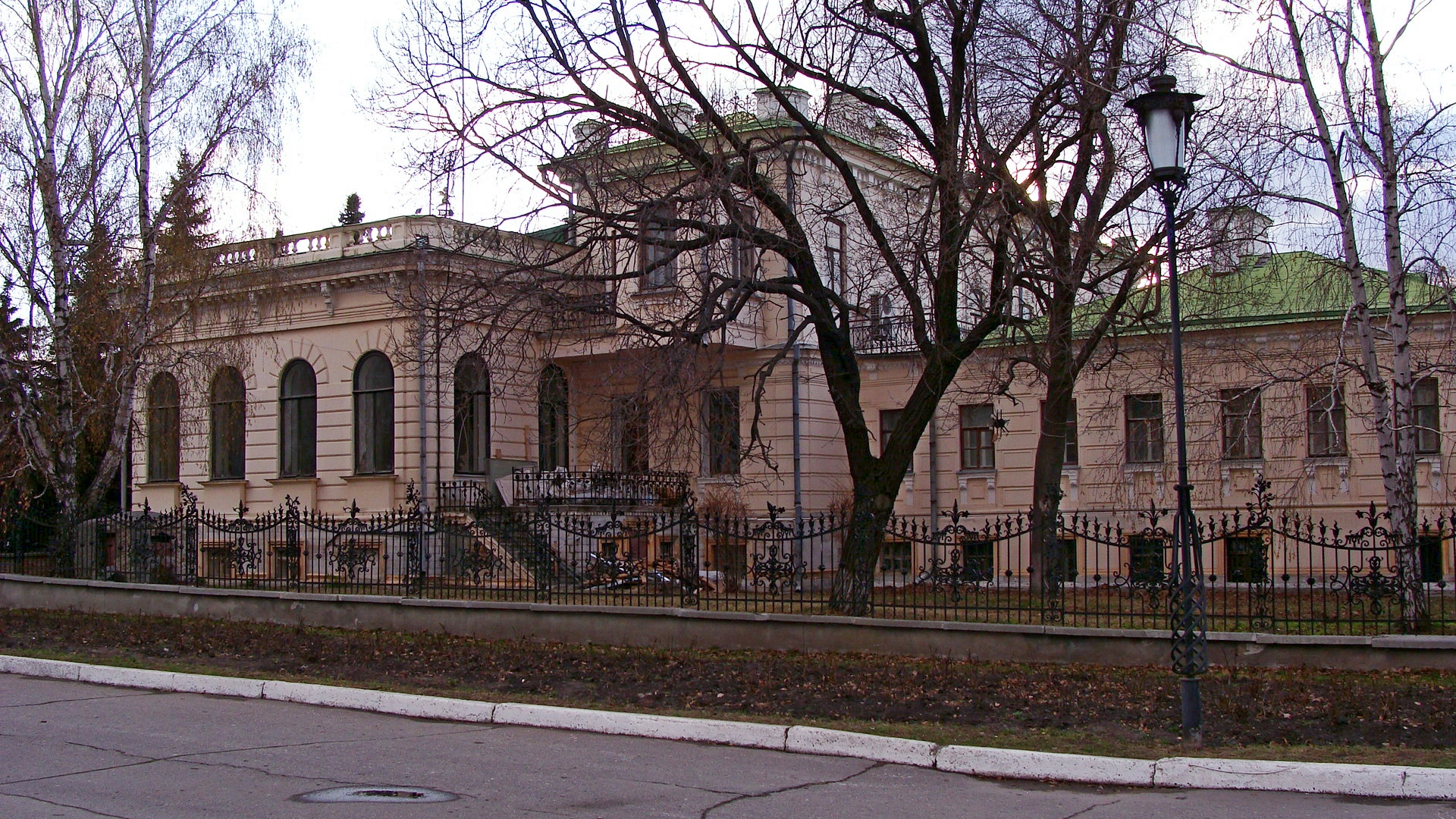
House of Merchant Chatrov

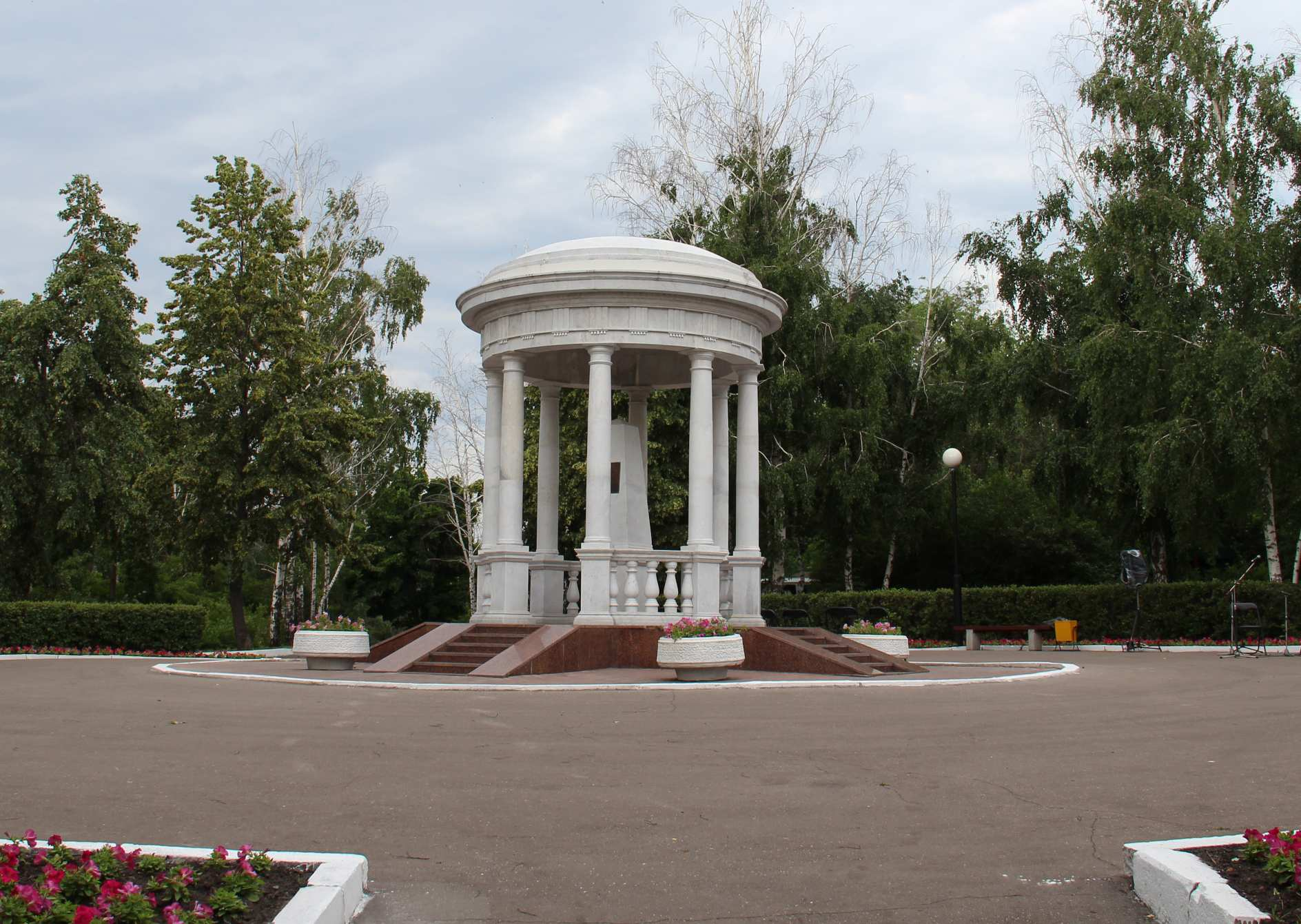
The Commemorative Arbor of Goncharov

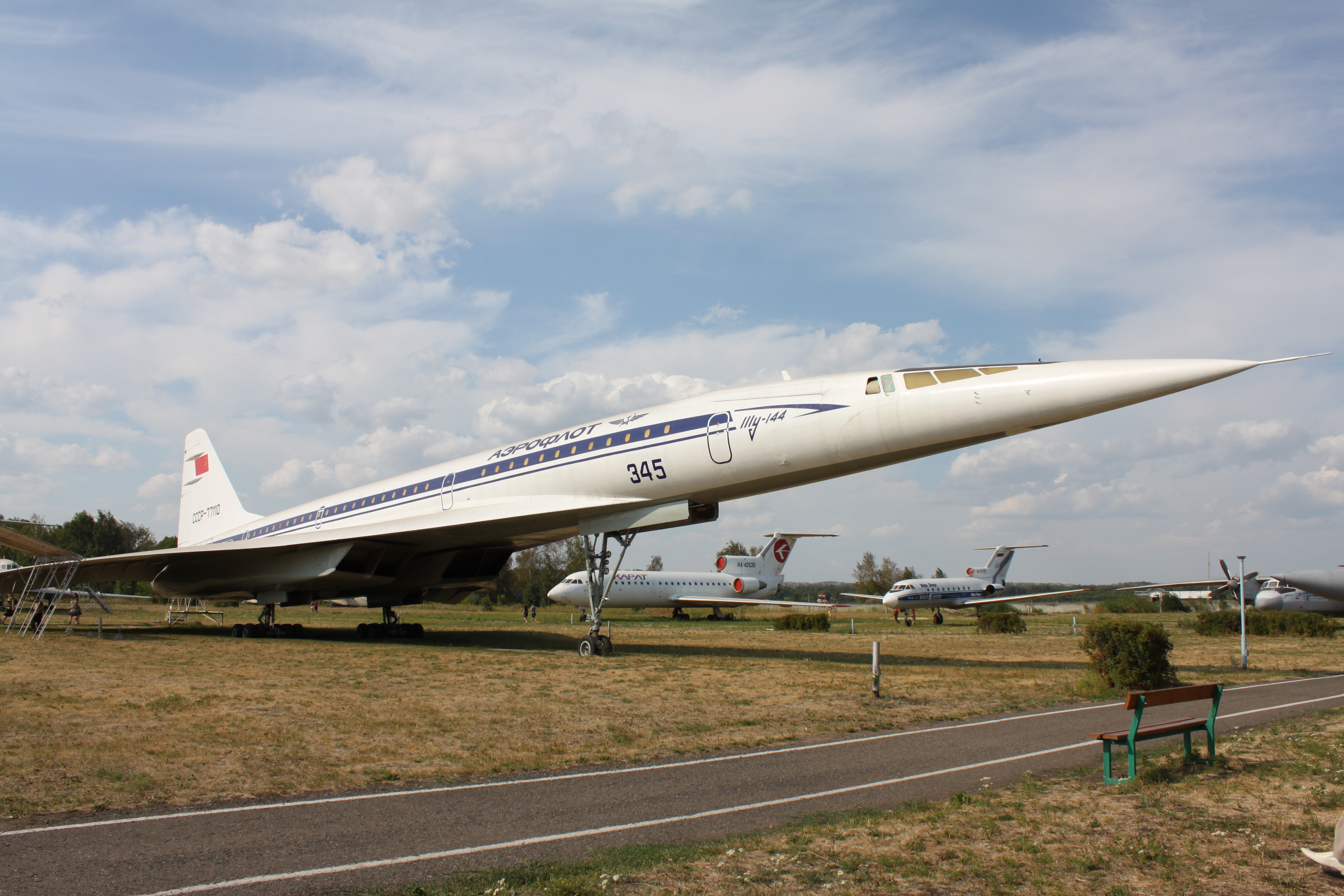
Tu-144 in the Ulyanovsk Aircraft Museum

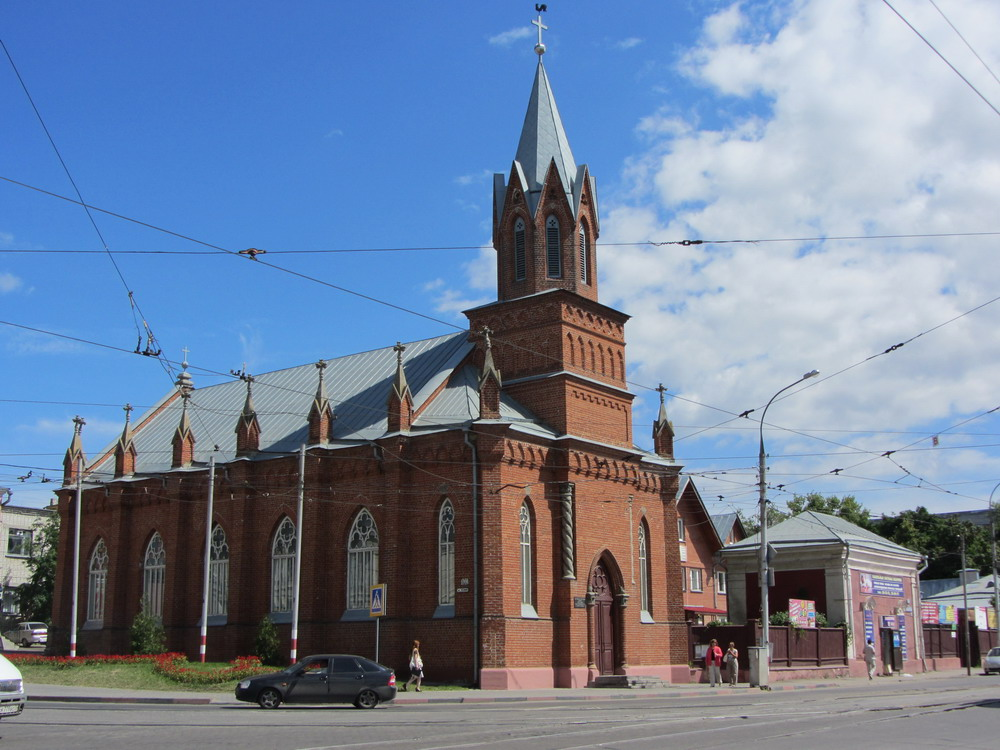
Saint Mary Lutheran Church

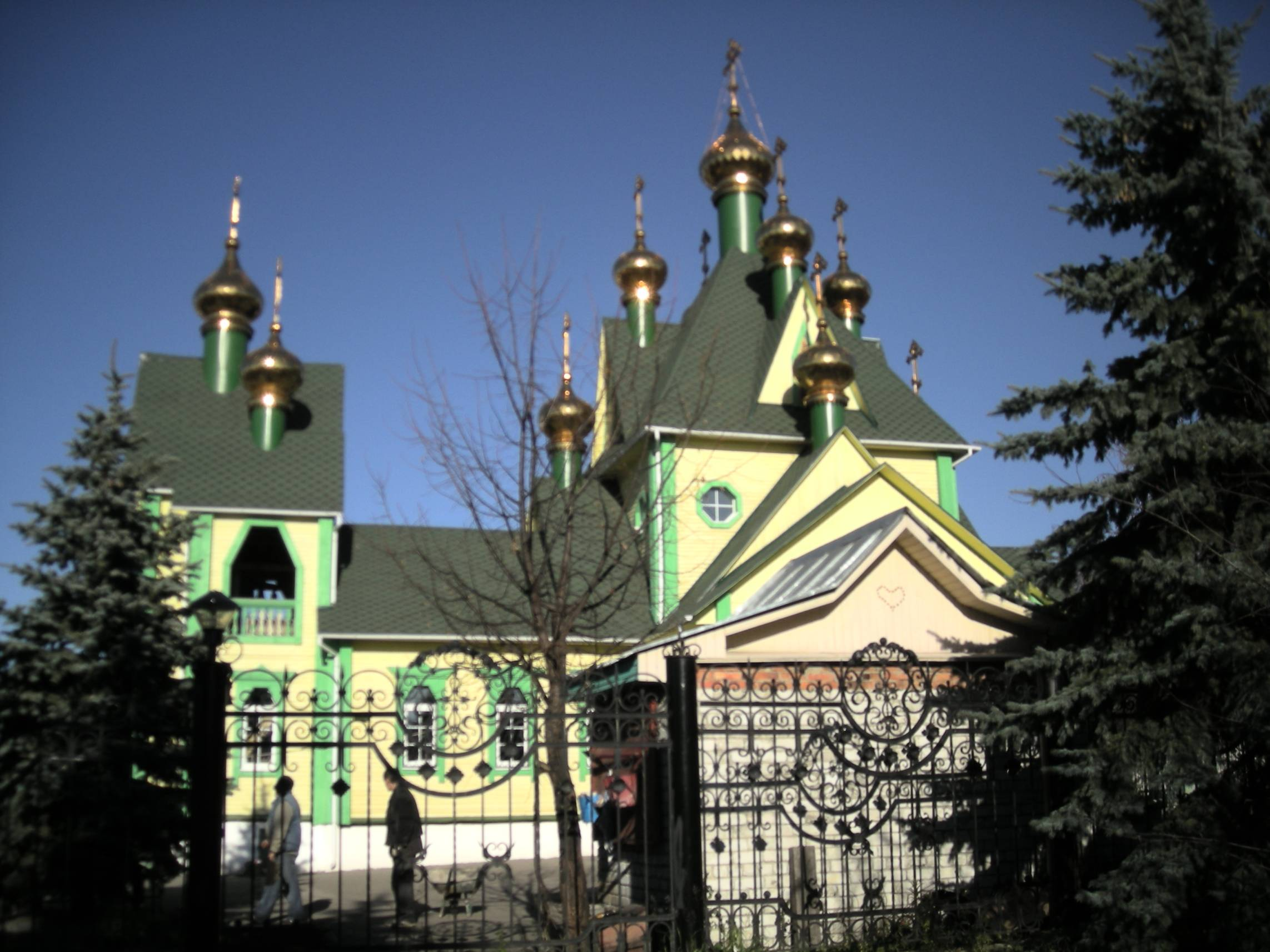
Russian Orthodox Church, Sviyaga district

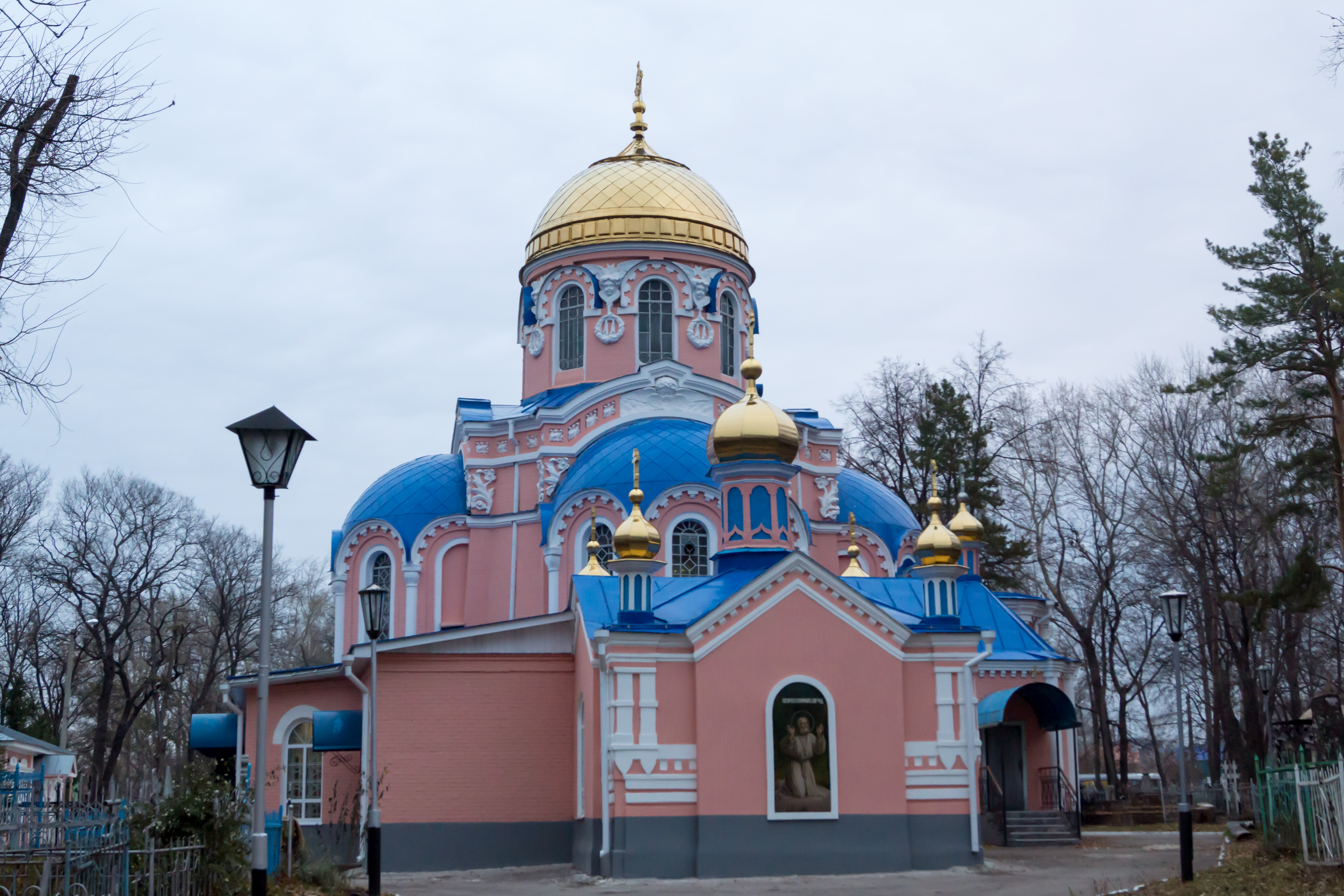
Voskresenkaya Russian Orthodox Church

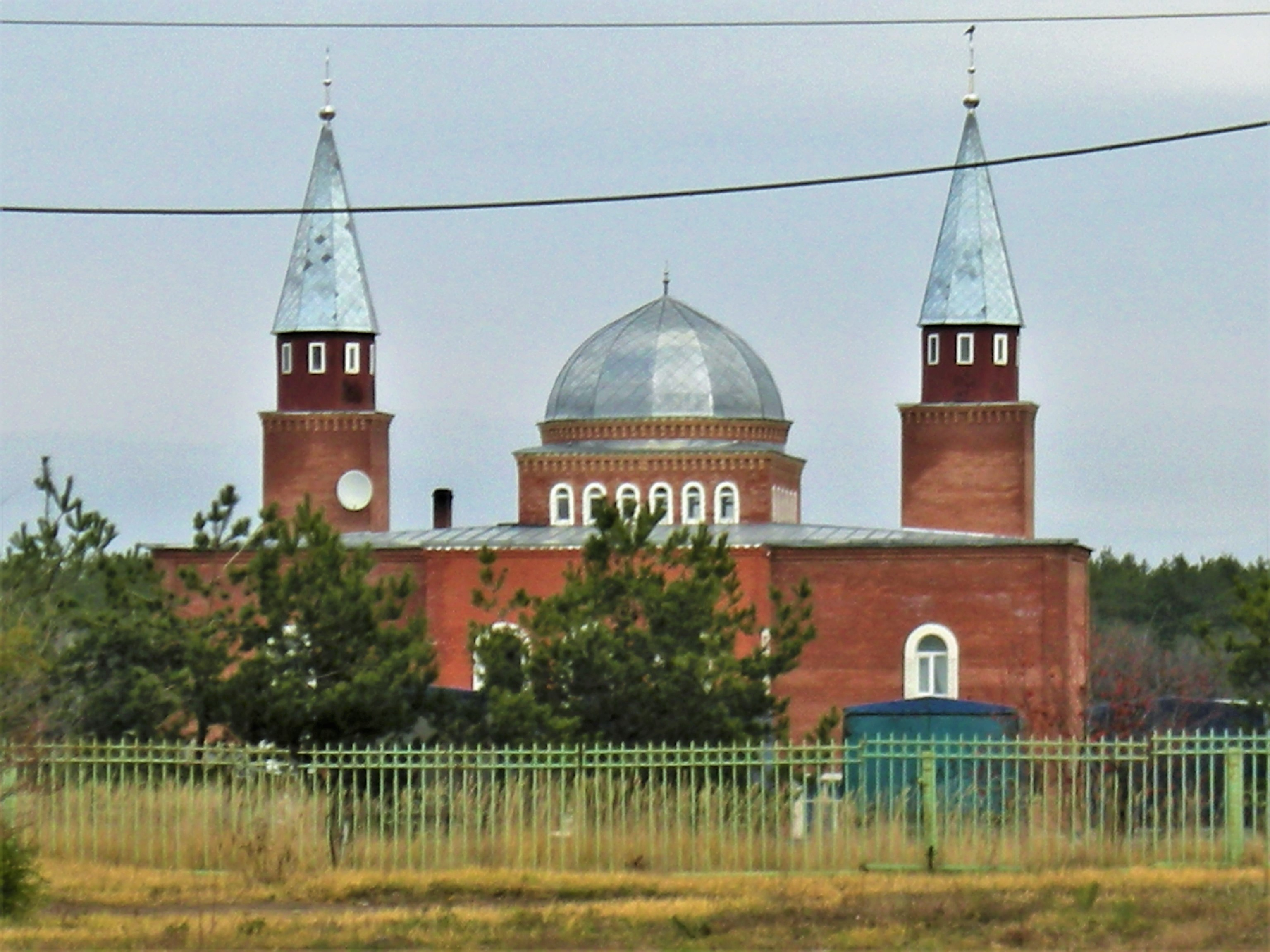
Mosque in Ulyanovsk district, New City

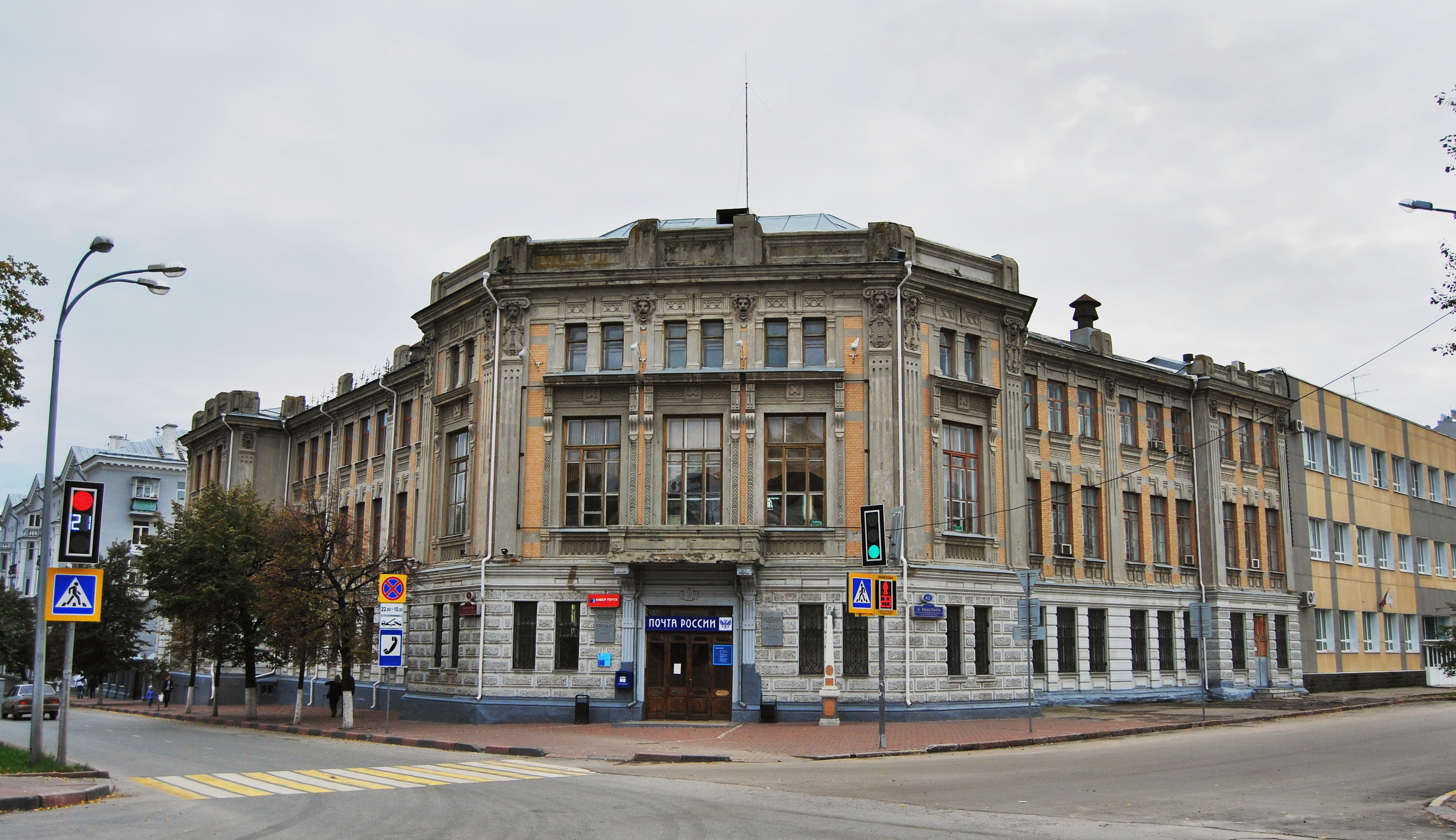
Russian Post Office on Goncharova 9

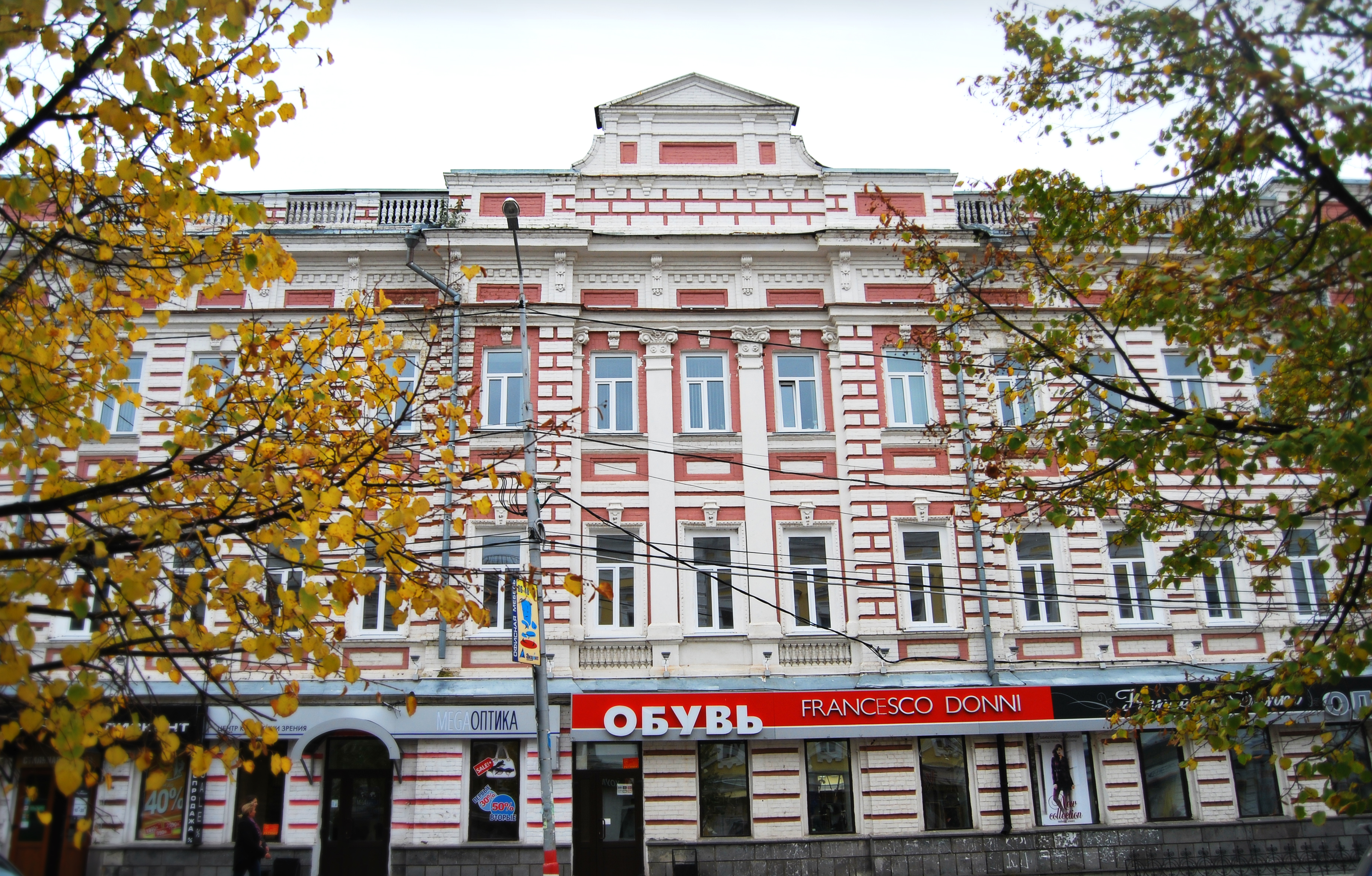
Downtown Ulyanovsk, Karl Marx Street 8

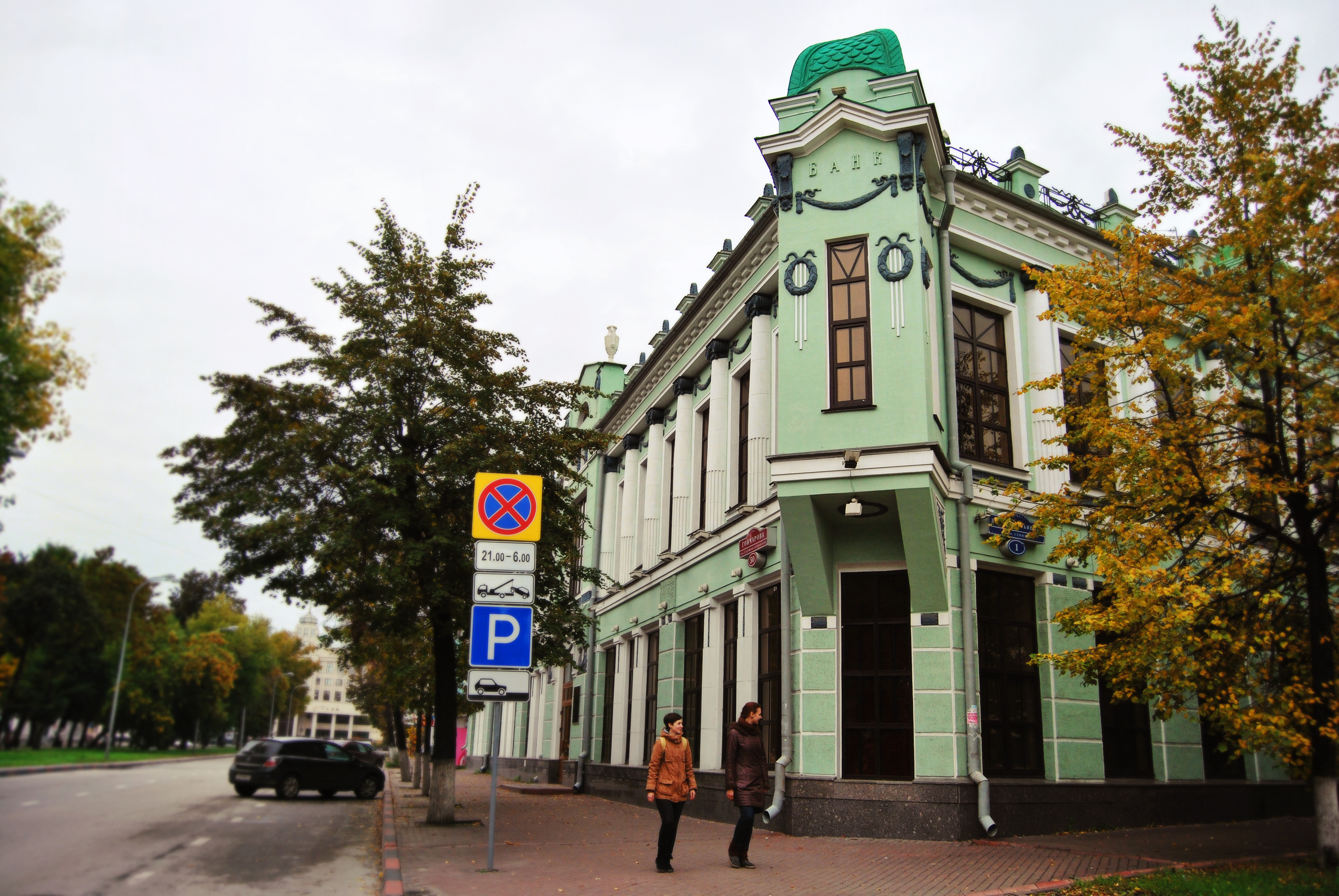
Bank Venets on Goncharova Street 50

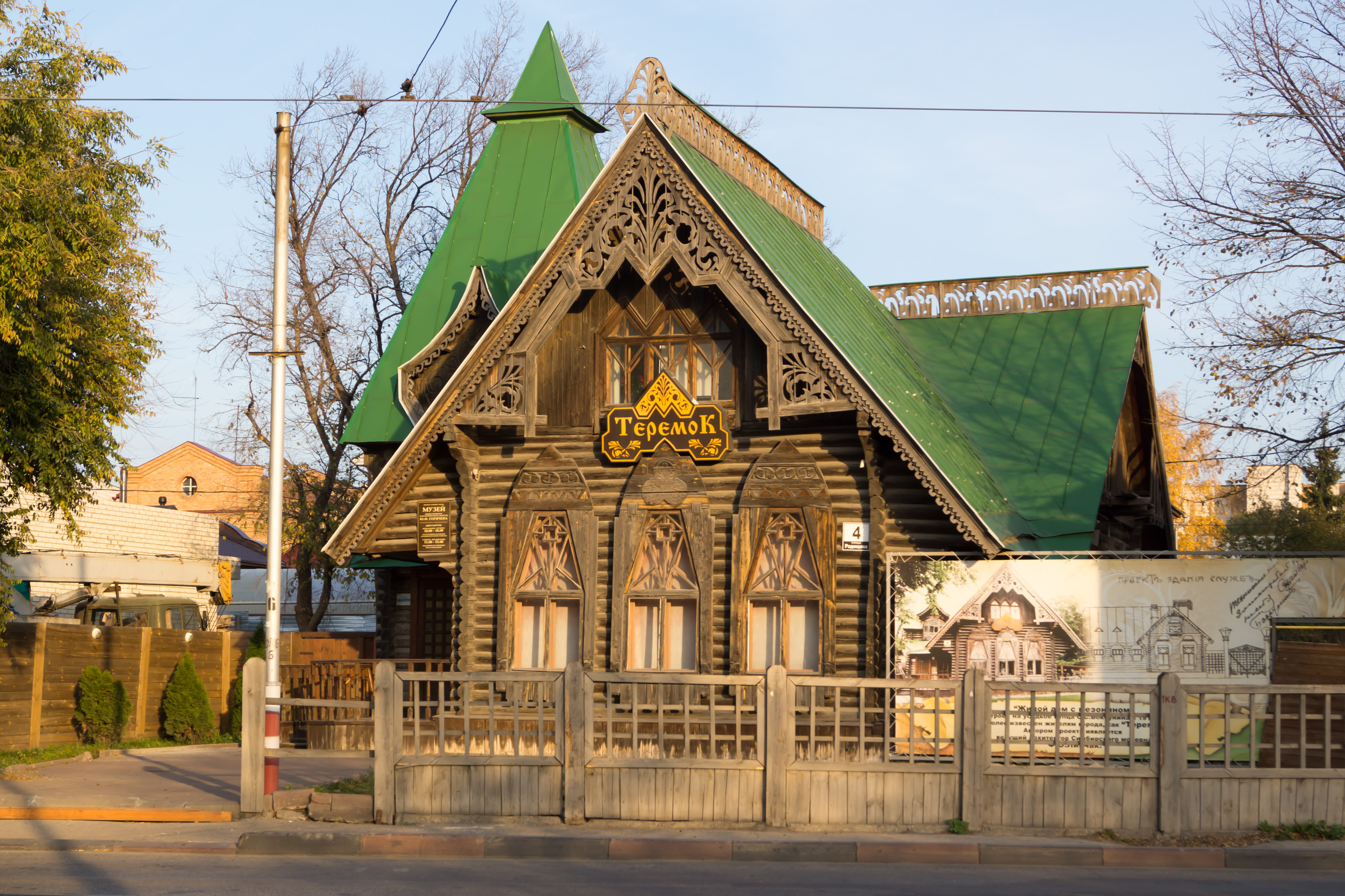
Wooden house of merchant Bokunin on Radisheva Street

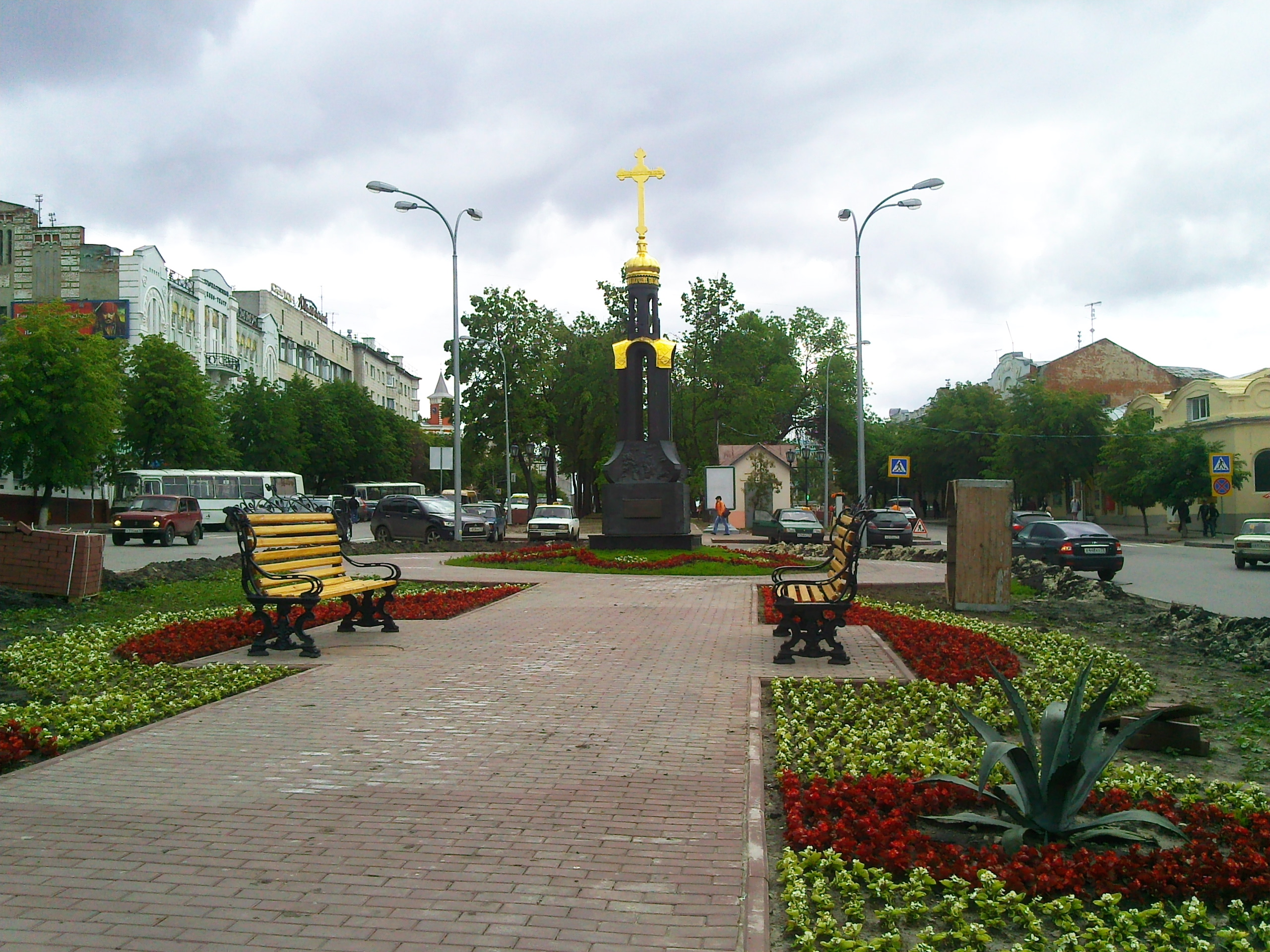
The Monument to Demolished Orthodox Churches on Goncharova Street

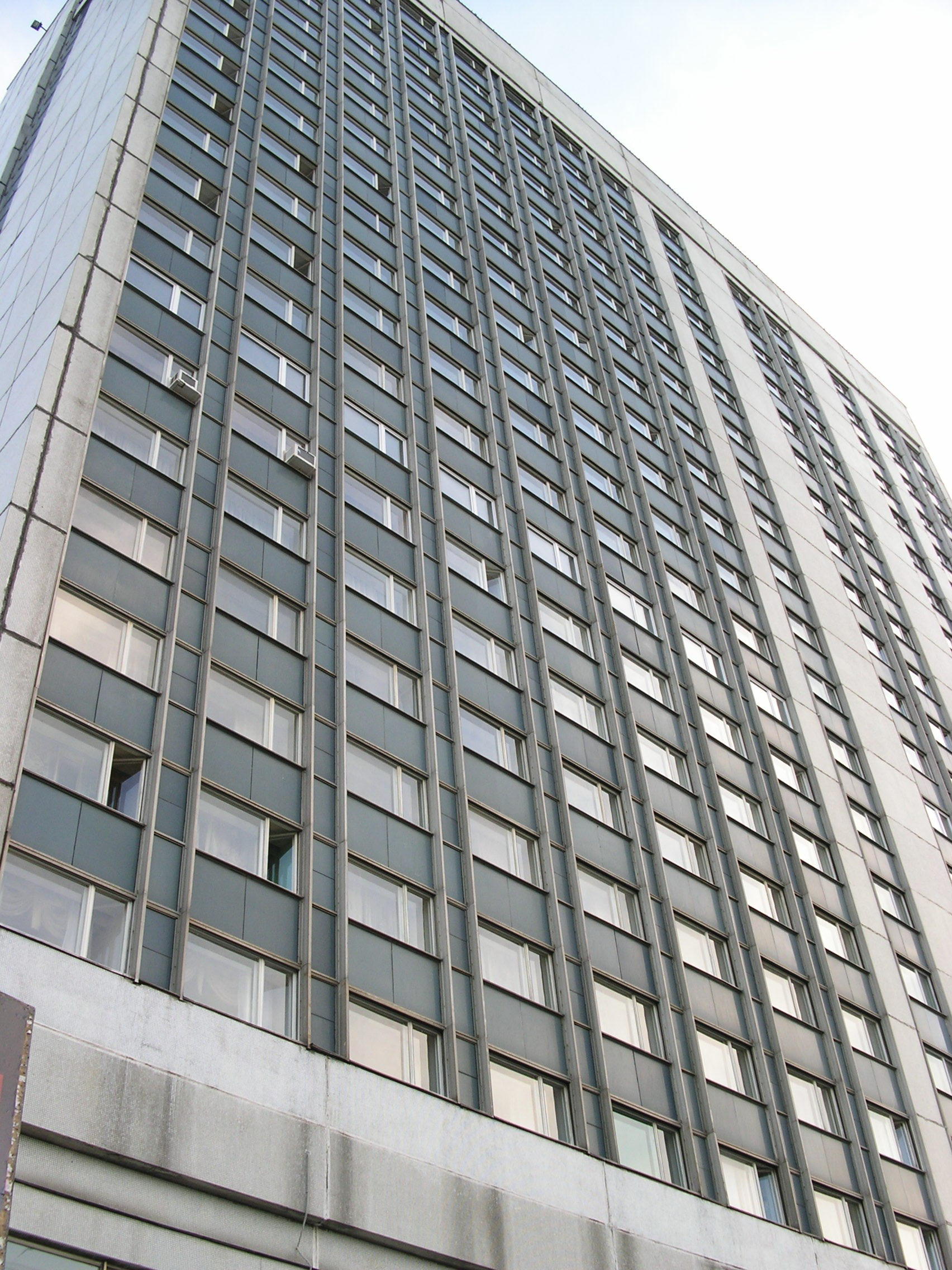
The tallest building in the city – The Hotel Venets (24 floors)

== Sources ==
- Законодательное Собрание Ульяновской области. Закон №126-ЗО от 3 октября 2006 г. «Об административно-территориальном устройстве Ульяновской области», в ред. Закона №225-ЗО от 29 декабря 2014 г. «О внесении изменений в Закон Ульяновской области "О муниципальных образованиях Ульяновской области" и Закон Ульяновской области "Об административно-территориальном устройстве Ульяновской области"». Опубликован: "Ульяновская правда", №77 (22.513), 6 октября 2006 г. (Legislative Assembly of Ulyanovsk Oblast. Law #126-ZO of October 3, 2006 On the Administrative-Territorial Structure of Ulyanovsk Oblast, as amended by the Law #225-ZO of December 29, 2014 On Amending the Law of Ulyanovsk Oblast "On the Municipal Formations of Ulyanovsk Oblast" and the Law of Ulyanovsk Oblast "On the Administrative-Territorial Structure of Ulyanovsk Oblast". ).
- Законодательное Собрание Ульяновской области. Закон №043-ЗО от 13 июля 2004 г. «О муниципальных образованиях Ульяновской области», в ред. Закона №225-ЗО от 29 декабря 2014 г. «О внесении изменений в Закон Ульяновской области "О муниципальных образованиях Ульяновской области" и Закон Ульяновской области "Об административно-территориальном устройстве Ульяновской области"». Вступил в силу через десять дней после официального опубликования. Опубликован: "Деловой Вестник", №78(2818), 20 июля 2004 г. (Legislative Assembly of Ulyanovsk Oblast. Law #043-ZO of July 13, 2004 On the Municipal Formations of Ulyanovsk Oblast, as amended by the Law #225-ZO of December 29, 2014 On Amending the Law of Ulyanovsk Oblast "On the Municipal Formations of Ulyanovsk Oblast" and the Law of Ulyanovsk Oblast "On the Administrative-Territorial Structure of Ulyanovsk Oblast". Effective as of the day which is ten days after the official publication.).
