= William Hunter (publisher) =

Publisher in Colonial America

William Hunter, Sr.
- Born: June 1, 1700; Yorktown, York County, Colony of Virginia, English America
- Died: August 14, 1761 (aged 61); Williamsburg, Colony of Virginia, British America
- Occupations: Colonial printer; Printing press shop foreman
- Years active: 1742-1761
- Era: Crown Royal Colony Governors; House of Burgesses; Loyalism
- Known for: Colony of Virginia laws (1619-1792); House of Burgesses of Virginia journals (1619-1776); Williamsburg Bray School
- Notable work: Colony of Virginia official printer (1750-1761); The Virginia Gazette (1751-1761)
- Predecessor: William Parks
- Successor: John Stretch; Joseph Royle
- Partner: Elizabeth Reynolds
- Children: 1
- Parents: William Thomas Sempill Hunter Sr. (1682-1742); Elizabeth Cunningham (1680-1746)
- Relatives: Matrilineage: Sir Alexander Cuninghame, 1st Baronet; Sir Archibald Stewart, 1st Baronet, of Blackhall

Deputy Postmaster General of British America
- In office August 10, 1753 – August 14, 1761 Serving with Benjamin Franklin (1753–)
- Preceded by: Position reestablished
- Succeeded by: Benjamin Franklin

William Hunter Sr. (1700–1761) was a Colonial printer and publisher for the Colony of Virginia in British America during the reign of George II of Great Britain. William Hunter was of Scottish lineage firmly established by his parents William Thomas Sempill Hunter Sr. from Clackmannanshire, Scotland and Elizabeth Cunningham from Corsehill, Ayrshire, Scotland.

Hunter was a resolute bachelor during adulthood along the Virginia Peninsula. He had a natural son William Hunter Jr. as an out of wedlock arrangement which excluded a marital union with Elizabeth Reynolds a resident of Colonial Williamsburg.

== Proprietor of Colonial Williamsburg Print Shop ==
The Colonial Williamsburg Print Shop was built by William Parks in 1736. The colonial American timber-framed structure was recognized as the first letterpress printing establishments for the Colony of Virginia in the 18th century.

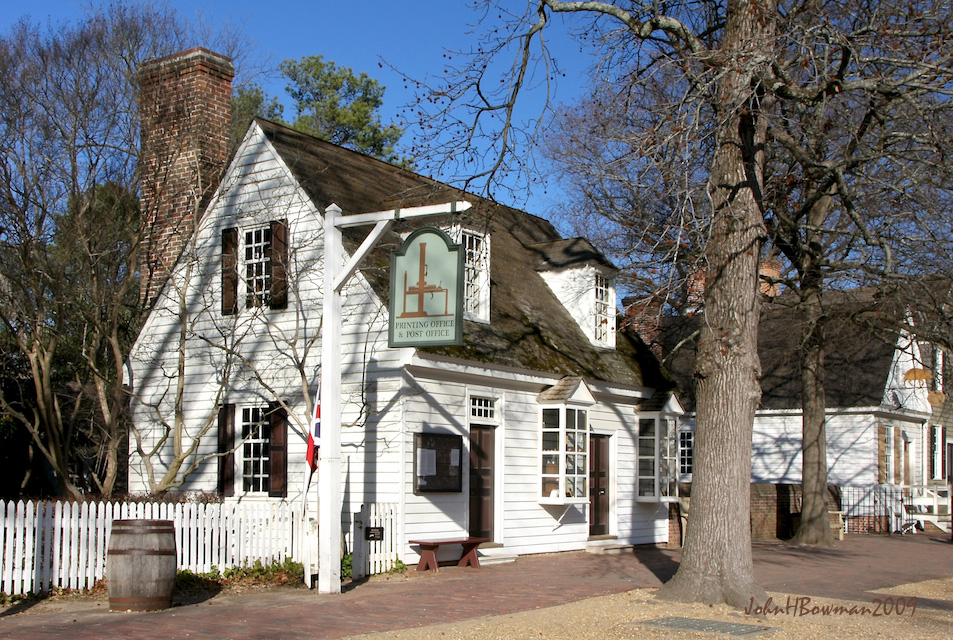
Colonial Williamsburg Shop at Duke of Gloucester Street

In 1743, William Hunter was apprenticed as a compositor with William Parks. By 1749, Hunter was delegated as shop foreman for the Colonial Williamsburg Print Shop. In 1750, upon the interment of William Parks, the Colonial Williamsburg publishing operations were lateral to William Hunter acquiring the typesetting talents of John Holt and a brother John Henry Hunter (1714–1774).

The print shop would persevere the publishing of the Colony of Virginia laws, House of Burgesses of Virginia journals, Virginia Almanack, and Virginia Gazette reasonably appeasing the social conscience of the governing British Crown during 18th century loyalism in British America.

The Hunter print shop sustained cordial relations with Colonial Williamsburg clergy publishing journals and sermons for ministers as John Camm, Samuel Davies, and George Whitefield. The clerical relations would flourish during the House of Burgesses litigating the Two Penny Act which eventually coerced Patrick Henry deliberating the ethical dilemma of the Parson's Cause of 1763.

== See also ==
- Richard Bland
- Early American publishers and printers
- Francis Fauquier
- Global spread of the printing press
- History of American newspapers
- Papermaking
- Robert Dinwiddie
- Williamsburg Paper Mill

== Franklin Papers Archives regarding William Hunter in British America ==
- Franklin, Benjamin. "Philadelphia Post Office Record Books, 1737–53". Founders Online. U.S. National Archives and Records Administration.
- Franklin, Benjamin; Hunter, William (December 24, 1754). "Benjamin Franklin and William Hunter: Commission to Thomas Vernon, 24 December 1754". Founders Online. U.S. National Archives and Records Administration.
- Franklin, Benjamin (August 29, 1757). "Post Office Account with William Hunter, 29 August 1757". Founders Online. U.S. National Archives and Records Administration.
- Hunter, William (November 30, 1757). "To Benjamin Franklin from William Hunter, 30 November 1757". Founders Online. U.S. National Archives and Records Administration.

== Bibliography ==
- Virginia General Assembly. "Journals of the House of Burgesses of Virginia (1619 - 1776)". HathiTrust Digital Library. Richmond, Virginia: Colonial press and E. Waddey Company. OCLC 6389173.
- Hening, William Waller. "Virginia laws (1619–1792)" [The Statutes at Large: Being a Collection of All the Laws of Virginia]. HathiTrust Digital Library. Richmond, Virginia: R. & W. & G. Bartow. OCLC 228720354.
- "Virginia Records, 1606-1737" [Thomas Jefferson Papers, 1606 to 1827]. United States Library of Congress.
- Munsell, Joel (1870). "A Chronology of Paper and Paper-making". HathiTrust Digital Library. Albany, New York: J. Munsell. LCCN 10000968. OCLC 1158638.
- Munsell, Joel (1876). "Chronology of the Origin and Progress of Paper and Paper-making". HathiTrust Digital Library. Albany, New York: J. Munsell. LCCN 09018808. OCLC 2637748.
- Wolfe, Brendan. "Associates of Dr. Bray and the Bray Schools". Encyclopedia Virginia. Virginia Humanities.
- "Williamsburg Bray School". Colonial Williamsburg Historic Site. Colonial Williamsburg Foundation.
- "Virginia Almanacks (1717–1814)". Rockefeller Library Collections. Colonial Williamsburg Foundation.
- "Virginia Gazettes". Rockefeller Library Collections. Colonial Williamsburg Foundation.
- Weeks, Lyman Horace (1916). "A History of Paper-Manufacturing in the United States, 1690-1916". HathiTrust Digital Library. New York, New York: The Lockwood Trade Journal Company. LCCN 17012277. OCLC 566946.
- Hunter, Dard (1930). "Papermaking through Eighteen Centuries". HathiTrust Digital Library. New York, New York: House of William Edwin Rudge. LCCN 30014991. OCLC 1466921.

== Video media archive ==
- 18th-Century Printing at Colonial Williamsburg on YouTube
- International Printing Museum Tour playlist on YouTube
