= Joseph Royle =

- Born: May 1, 1732; Manchester, England
- Died: January 26, 1766 (aged 33); Colonial Williamsburg
- Occupations: Colonial printer; Printing press shop foreman
- Years active: 1759-1766
- Era: Crown Royal Colony Governors; House of Burgesses; Loyalism
- Known for: Colony of Virginia arrival July 5, 1759; Declined publication of Stamp Act Resolves, 1765; Published Parson's Cause pamphlets
- Notable work: Colony of Virginia official printer (1761-1766); The Virginia Gazette publisher (1761-1766)
- Predecessor: William Parks; William Hunter
- Successor: Alexander Purdie Sr.; John Dixon Sr.
- Spouse: Rosanna Hunter (m. 11/19/1761)
- Children: 2

Joseph Royle (1732-1766) was a Colonial printer and publisher in British America during the reign of George III. Royle was born in 1732 within the geography of North West England reasonably substantiating his scottish ancestry. Royle married Rosanna Hunter and had two sons, William Royle and Hunter Royle.

== Craftsmanship at Colonial Williamsburg Print Shop ==
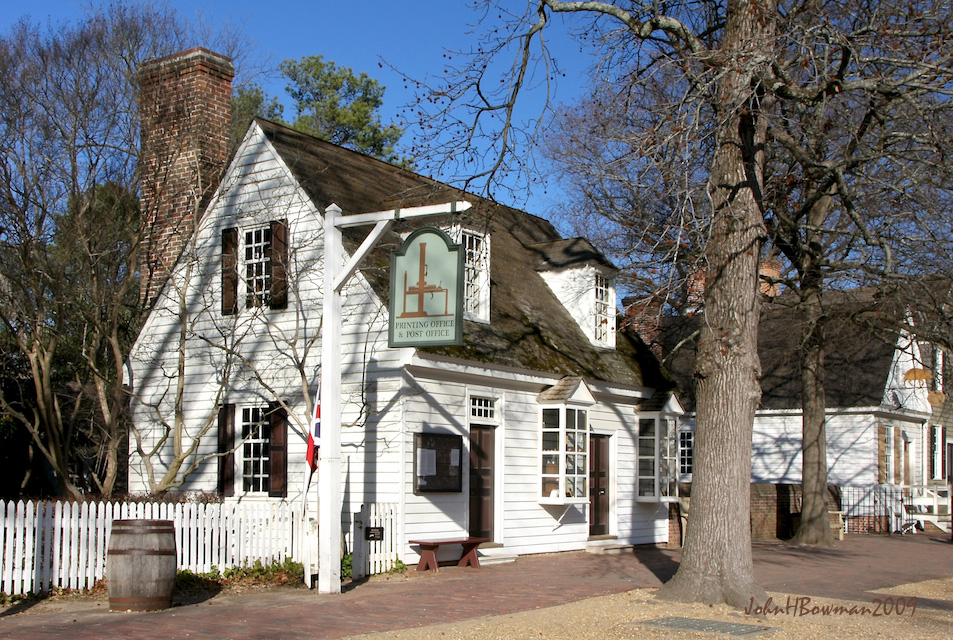
Colonial Williamsburg Shop at Duke of Gloucester Street

The Colonial Williamsburg print shop was established by William Parks on August 6, 1736 printing the first issues of The Virginia Gazette. William Hunter served as a successor of Parks upon his death in 1750. Hunter support of the Colonial Williamsburg printing press works sustained until his death in 1761.

Joseph Royle assisted William Hunter typesetting talents by serving as his printing press foreman at the Colonial Williamsburg print shop. In 1761, Royle sustained the compositors and publishing operations at the Colonial Williamsburg shop competently considering the arduous stamp duties laden by the Kingdom of Great Britain. The Virginia Almanack and Virginia Gazette remained in circulation for the Colony of Virginia despite Royle spells with a contagious disease known as pertussis or potentially tuberculosis.

== See also ==
- Early American publishers and printers
- Francis Fauquier
- Global spread of the printing press
- History of American newspapers
- John Camm
- Papermaking
- Richard Bland
- Robert Dinwiddie
- Sir William Gooch
- Williamsburg Paper Mill

== Franklin Papers Archives regarding Joseph Royle in British America ==
- Franklin, Benjamin (July 9, 1764). "Post Office Accounts, [9 July 1764]". Founders Online. U.S. National Archives and Records Administration.
- Parker, James (August 8, 1765). "To Benjamin Franklin from James Parker, 8 August 1765". Founders Online. U.S. National Archives and Records Administration.
- Franklin, Benjamin (February 3, 1766). "To Benjamin Franklin from James Parker, 3 February 1766". Founders Online. U.S. National Archives and Records Administration.
- Franklin, Benjamin (March 27, 1766). "To Benjamin Franklin from James Parker, 27 March 1766". Founders Online. U.S. National Archives and Records Administration.
- Franklin, Benjamin (June 6, 1766). "From Benjamin Franklin to Benjamin Waller, 6 June 1766". Founders Online. U.S. National Archives and Records Administration.

== Bibliography ==
- Munsell, Joel (1870). "A Chronology of Paper and Paper-making". HathiTrust Digital Library. Albany, New York: J. Munsell. LCCN 10000968. OCLC 1158638.
- Munsell, Joel (1876). "Chronology of the Origin and Progress of Paper and Paper-making". HathiTrust Digital Library. Albany, New York: J. Munsell. LCCN 09018808. OCLC 2637748.
- Weeks, Lyman Horace (1916). "A History of Paper-Manufacturing in the United States, 1690-1916". HathiTrust Digital Library. New York, New York: The Lockwood Trade Journal Company. LCCN 17012277. OCLC 566946.
- Brigham, Clarence S (April 9, 1924). Bibliography of American Newspapers, 1690-1820. Worcester, Massachusetts: American Antiquarian Society. pp. 144–145. OCLC 37007754 – via HathiTrust Digital Library.
- Hunter, Dard (1930). "Papermaking through Eighteen Centuries". HathiTrust Digital Library. New York, New York: House of William Edwin Rudge. LCCN 30014991. OCLC 1466921.
- McMurtrie, Douglas C (1935). The First Printing in Virginia: The Abortive Attempt at Jamestown, the First Permanent Press at Williamsburg, the Early Gazettes, and the Work of Other Virginia Typographic Pioneers. Vienna, Austria: H. Reichner Verlag. OCLC 2315340.
- McMurtrie, Douglas C (July 1936). A History of Printing in the United States; The Story of the Introduction of the Press and of Its History and Influences During the Pioneer Period in Each State of the Union [Typographia An Ode, On Printing]. R.R. Bowker Company. p. 288. OCLC 3648334 – via HathiTrust Digital Library.
- Klapper, August (1958). The Printer in Eighteenth-Century Williamsburg : An Account of his Life and Times, His Office and His Craft. Williamsburg, Virginia: Colonial Williamsburg. pp. 4, 13–14, 31. OCLC 3519363 – via HathiTrust Digital Library.
- Documentaries, Timeline - World History. "How The Printing Press Revolutionized The World ~ The Machine That Made Us - Timeline". World History Encyclopedia. World History Foundation ~ World History Publishing.

== Video media archive ==
- 18th-Century Printing at Colonial Williamsburg on YouTube
- International Printing Museum Tour playlist on YouTube
