= Elizabeth Holt =

Elizabeth Holt may refer to:

- Elizabeth Gilmore Holt (1905–1987), American art historian
- Elizabeth Hunter Holt (c. 1726–1788), American newspaper publisher
