= Reading Mercury =

English former newspaper

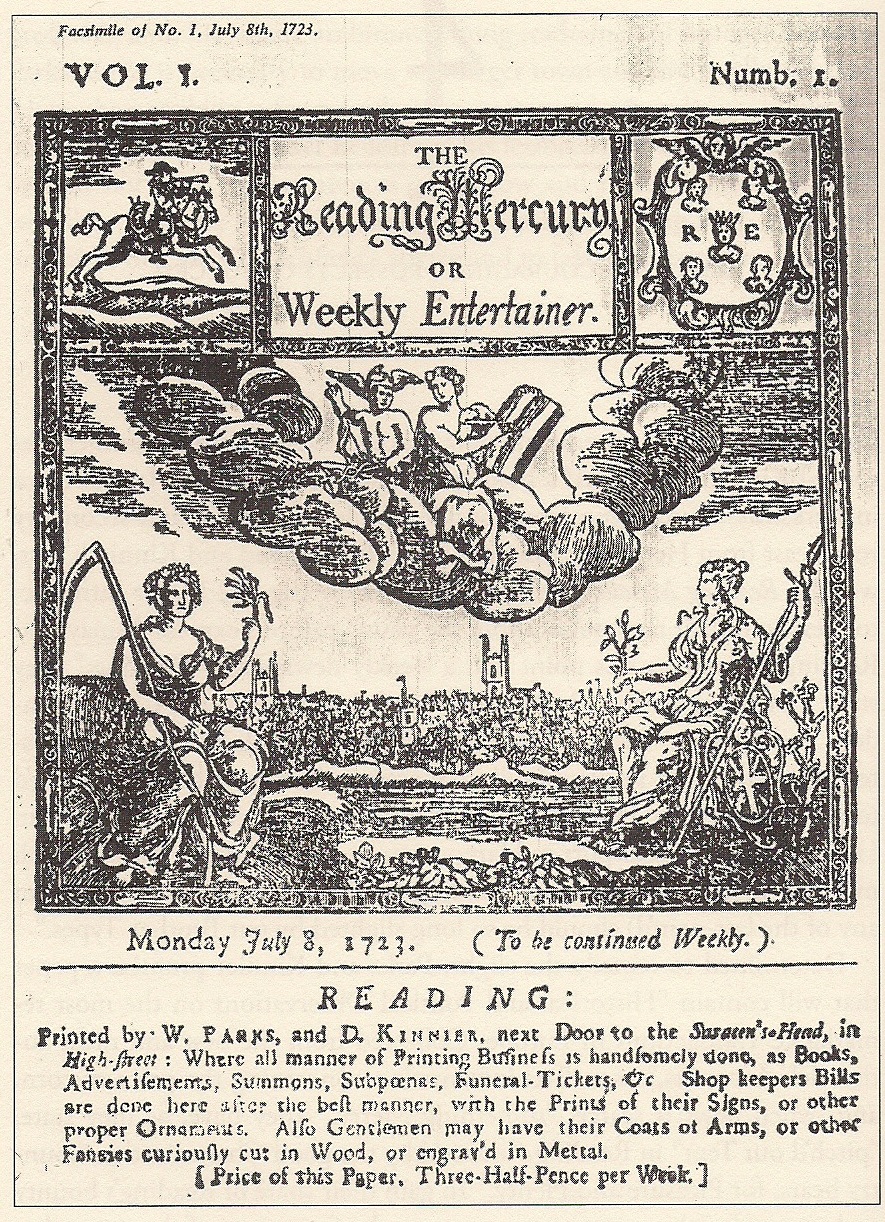
- First issue, 8 July 1723
- Type: Weekly
- Format: Broadsheet
- Founded: 8 July 1723
- Language: English
- Ceased publication: 28 May 1987
- Headquarters: Reading, Berkshire, England

The Reading Mercury was a weekly newspaper covering the county of Berkshire and neighbouring Oxfordshire, founded and based in the town of Reading. Published between 8 July 1723 and 28 May 1987, the Reading Mercury was regarded throughout much of its existence as one of the principal news publications in Reading. Throughout its history, it was known as the Reading Mercury or Weekly Entertainer, Oxford Gazette, Newbury Herald and Berkshire County Paper among other names.

== History ==
The Reading Mercury was founded as the Reading Mercury or Weekly Entertainer on 8 July 1723, first printed by William Parks and D. Kinnier, as the first newspaper in Reading. By July 1727, the ownership of the paper had been transferred to William Ayres. By 1737, William Carnan appeared on the in-print of the paper. Carnan died late that same year, after which he was succeeded by his brother and widow; she later married John Newbery, who then partly held ownership over the Ready Mercury. Newbery, who was more interested in writing children's books, employed Charles Micklewright as a printer in 1740. After Micklewright's death in 1755, the ownership of the Reading Mercury would change hands several times, including by John Carnan in 1761 and Newbery's stepdaughter, Anna Maria Smart, by January 1762, who then ran the publication together. After Carnan's death in 1784, Smart ran it alongside T. Cowslade.

By the 19th century, the Reading Mercury had become the principal newspaper in Reading. It later saw competition from the rival Berkshire Chronicle, founded in January 1825. Between 1837 and 1855, the circulation of the Reading Mercury had risen from 2,432 to 4,217. In an 1861 advertisement, the Reading Mercury claimed a weekly circulation of 4,700; in 1873, that number had risen to 4,800. In 1870, the Reading Mercury had an annual circulation of 55,000, making it the 33rd largest English provincial newspaper. In 1912, its weekly circulation was about 10,000.

During its last two decades the Reading Mercury changed its name several times—Berkshire Mercury (11 July 1970 – 24 December 1980), The Mercury (13 December 1980 – 30 June 1983) and finally the Reading and Berkshire Mercury (6 July 1983 – 28 May 1987). (Note: The dates are when the name was first used in an issue of the Reading Mercury; as it was a weekly newspaper, this means there are pauses in between some of the dates.) The paper ceased publication on 28 May 1987, following a rapid decline in circulation. Since 9 February 2013, issues of the Reading Mercury are being digitised and added to the British Newspaper Archive.
