= James Maury =

American minister

James Maury (1718–1769) was a prominent Virginia educator and Anglican cleric during the American Colonial period and the progenitor of the prominent Maury political family. The Reverend James Maury was a participant with the notable lawsuit that became known as "The Parson's Cause" in 1763, in which the young attorney Patrick Henry argued that the colony had the right to establish its own method of payment to clergy (which had been vetoed by the Crown).

Born in Dublin of French Protestant Huguenot ancestry, James Maury came to the Virginia colony as an infant with his parents. He attended The College of William and Mary and then established his own classical school for boys, where he taught the young Thomas Jefferson among others. In February 1742, Maury went to England and was ordained as an Anglican cleric of the established Church of England. Returning to Virginia, The Reverend James Maury was in charge for one year of a parish in King William County and then served for 18 years in Louisa County at Fredericksville Parish. He was highly regarded for his piety and learning. Maury was in charge of this parish until his death on June 9, 1769.

== Early life and education ==
He was the son of Matthew Maury, a French Huguenot, who was born in Castel Mauron, in Gascony, and his wife, Mary Anne Fontaine, daughter of Rev. James Fontaine and Anne Elizabeth Boursiquot. James Maury was born per his tombstone, April 8, 1717, in Dublin. Soon after his birth, the family emigrated to the Virginia colony, where hundreds of Huguenot refugees had settled above the falls of the James River during the early 1700s.

Maury was tutored and attended The College of William and Mary. After ordination to the Anglican ministry on July 31, 1742, he was appointed usher of its grammar school.

== Career ==
=== Educator ===
Maury had a private school where he taught the classics, manners and morals, mathematics, literature, history and geography. Most of Reverend Maury's pupils boarded at his school. Thomas Jefferson became one of his pupils for two years after the death of his father Peter Jefferson in 1757 and is said to have learned more about the classics from Maury than from any other instructor.

Reverend Maury's school is memorialized in a historical marker located near Gordonsville in Albemarle County, Virginia.

=== Ordained ministry ===
Ordained in 1742, The Reverend Maury first served for a year in King William County, then served in Louisa County and Fredericksville Parish.

=== Loyal Land Company ===
In 1749 Maury became enthusiastic about expeditions to the west and, together with Peter Jefferson, Dr. Thomas Walker, Joshua Fry, and others founded the Loyal Company of Virginia. They planned an expedition up the Missouri River to be commanded by Walker, but it was forestalled by the beginning of hostilities between England and France in the Seven Years' War in 1753 (termed the French and Indian War in the colonies). In a 1756 letter Maury described the proposed expedition, which foreshadowed the Lewis and Clark Expedition:

"Some persons were to be sent in search of that river Missouri, if that be the right name of it, in order to discover whether it had any communication with the Pacific Ocean; they were to follow the river if they found it, and exact reports of the country they passed through, the distances they traveled, what worth of navigation those rivers and lakes afforded, etc."

== Family ==
Rev. James Maury married Mary Walker (born November 22, 1724, in King and Queen County, Virginia), on November 11, 1743, in Louisa County, Virginia. Mary was the daughter of Captain James and Anne Walker.

Their children were:

- Matthew Maury, b. September 10, 1744, d. May 6, 1801
- "Consul" James Maury, b. February 3, 1746, d. February 23, 1840
- Leonard Maury, b. June 3, 1747, d. 1747
- Anne Maury, b. November 16, 1748, d. January 8, 1822
- Mary Maury, b. September 17, 1750
- Walker Maury, b. July 21, 1752, d. October 11, 1788
- Catherine Maury, b. July 15, 1754, d. July 26, 1786
- Elizabeth Maury, b. April 1, 1756
- Abram Maury, b. April 28, 1758
- Fontaine Maury, b. February 3, 1761, d. February 1824
- Benjamin Maury, b. January 17, 1763
- Richard Maury, b. May 19, 1766, d. January 31, 1843 father of Matthew Fontaine Maury
- Matilda Hite Maury, b. October 28, 1769, d. November 7, 1821

== The Parson's Cause ==
Maury opposed the colony's passage of the Two Penny Act of 1757, which proposed to pay clergy a set amount in cash rather than in tobacco, as had been the rule. The Crown had vetoed the colony's act and asserted that clergy must be paid in tobacco. Maury sued the parish collectors, who gathered the payment required for the clergy, for the full amount of his salary in tobacco. This suit, known in American history as the Parson's Cause, was an important legal and political dispute in the Colony of Virginia as it involved the question of taxation, and whether it was controlled by the colony or the Crown. It is considered an important event contributing to the American Revolution.

The case was defended by Peter Lyons, afterward president of the Virginia Supreme Court, and opposed by Patrick Henry. He denounced the interference of the King in setting aside the colony's law as treason to the people of Virginia. Maury won the lawsuit but the jury awarded him only one penny in damages. He continued to have the esteem of the people of Virginia. Afterward Maury wrote a letter discussing the case, which became known as "The Parson's Opinion of 'The Parson's Cause'".

Rev. James Maury and Patrick Henry had no animosity as a result of the case. Later Martha Henry, the attorney's eldest daughter, married John Fontaine, a near relation of Rev. James Maury, and whose ancestor was Rev. Peter Fontaine. They had the common ancestor of John de la Fontaine. (John Fontaine (6 Aug 1750, Hanover Co., Va; d. 14 Apr 1792, Henry Co., Va.) married Martha Henry 1774, Hanover Co., Va. (b. Jun 1755, Hanover Co., Va; d. 1818, Charlotte Co., Va.) They managed the Henry plantation of Leatherwood after her father was elected a second time as governor of Virginia.

issue:

1. Martha Henry Fontaine b. 4 Jul 1781; d. 12 Sep 1845, Ponotoc, MS.
2. William Winston Fontaine b. 25 Nov 1786, Henry Co., VA; d. Nov 1816.
3. Patrick Henry Fontaine
4. Charles B. Fontaine
5. John J. Fontaine b. 1788; d. 3 Jan 1852.

== Descendants ==
Maury's eldest son, James Maury (1746–1840), was appointed as the United States' first overseas consul. Thomas Jefferson petitioned then US President George Washington for his appointment. Maury became America's first consul to Liverpool, England, a position which he held from 1790 to 1829. He resigned due to Jacksonian politics.

During this overseas appointment, both he and his nephew Matthew Fontaine Maury (born in 1806) had opportunities to discuss and study the natural philosophy lectures (mainly physics) of Thomas Young, published in 1807. "Consul" James Maury's portrait still hangs in Liverpool Town Hall.
