= John Holt (publisher) =

American newspaper publisher (1721–1784)

- Born: 1721; Williamsburg, Virginia, British America
- Died: January 30, 1784 (aged 62–63)
- Resting place: St. Paul's Chapel, New York
- Occupations: Printer; postmaster
- Known for: Journalism
- Spouse: Elizabeth Hunter (before 1784)

John Holt (1721—1784) was a colonial American newspaper publisher, printer, postmaster, and mayor of Williamsburg, Virginia, United States. He was involved with publishing the Connecticut Gazette, the New York Gazette, and the New-York Journal newspapers. He worked with Benjamin Franklin, the prominent publisher James Parker, and Founding Father Samuel Adams. He had a store that sold miscellaneous supplies, ink, paper, and books on a variety of subjects including religion, freemasonry, economics, history, archaeology, poetry, and biographies.

The publications Holt printed reflected his readers' struggle between the colonies and England. He openly challenged the Stamp Act of 1765, which was a direct British tax on the colonies in America for many types of papers used that included legal documents, magazines, playing cards, and newspapers. Holt was the favorite printer of the Sons of Liberty, a political organization active in the Thirteen American Colonies founded to advance the rights of the colonists and to fight taxation by the British government.

== Early life ==
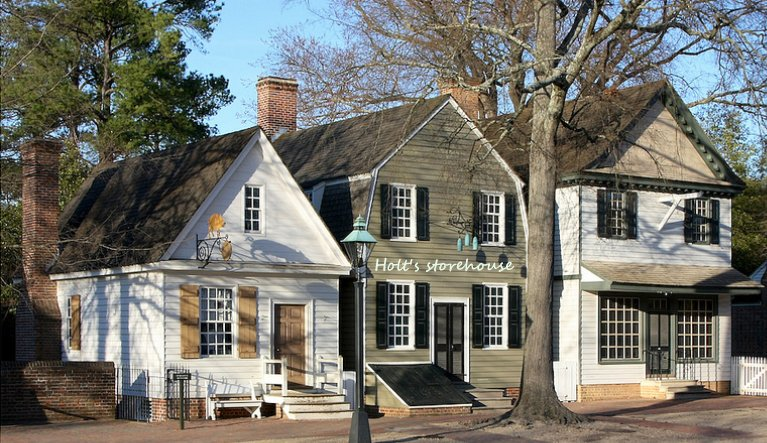
Holt's storehouse (center) Colonial Williamsburg reconstruction

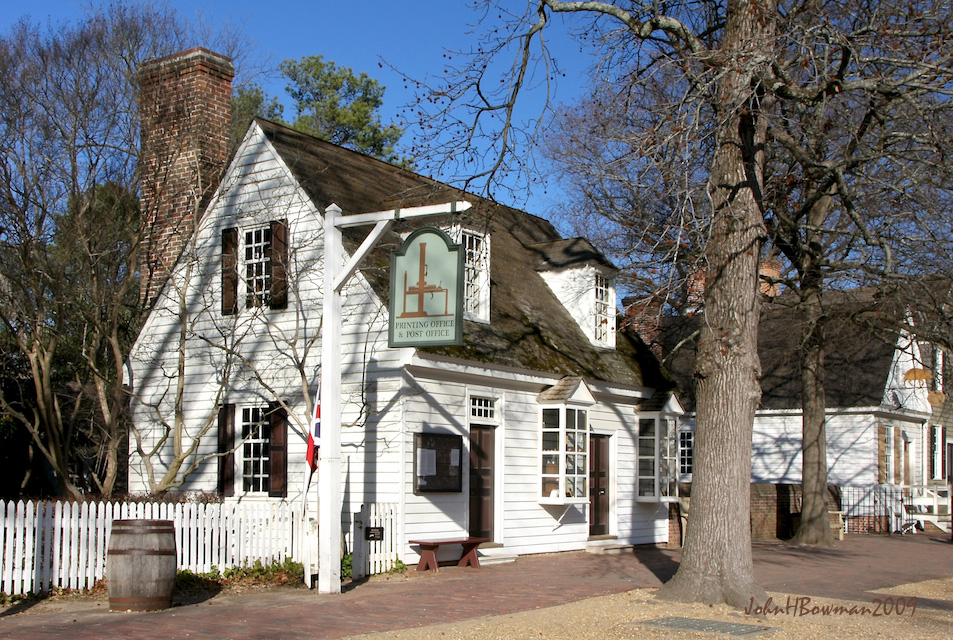
Colonial Williamsburg printing office (reconstructed), where Holt learned the trade.

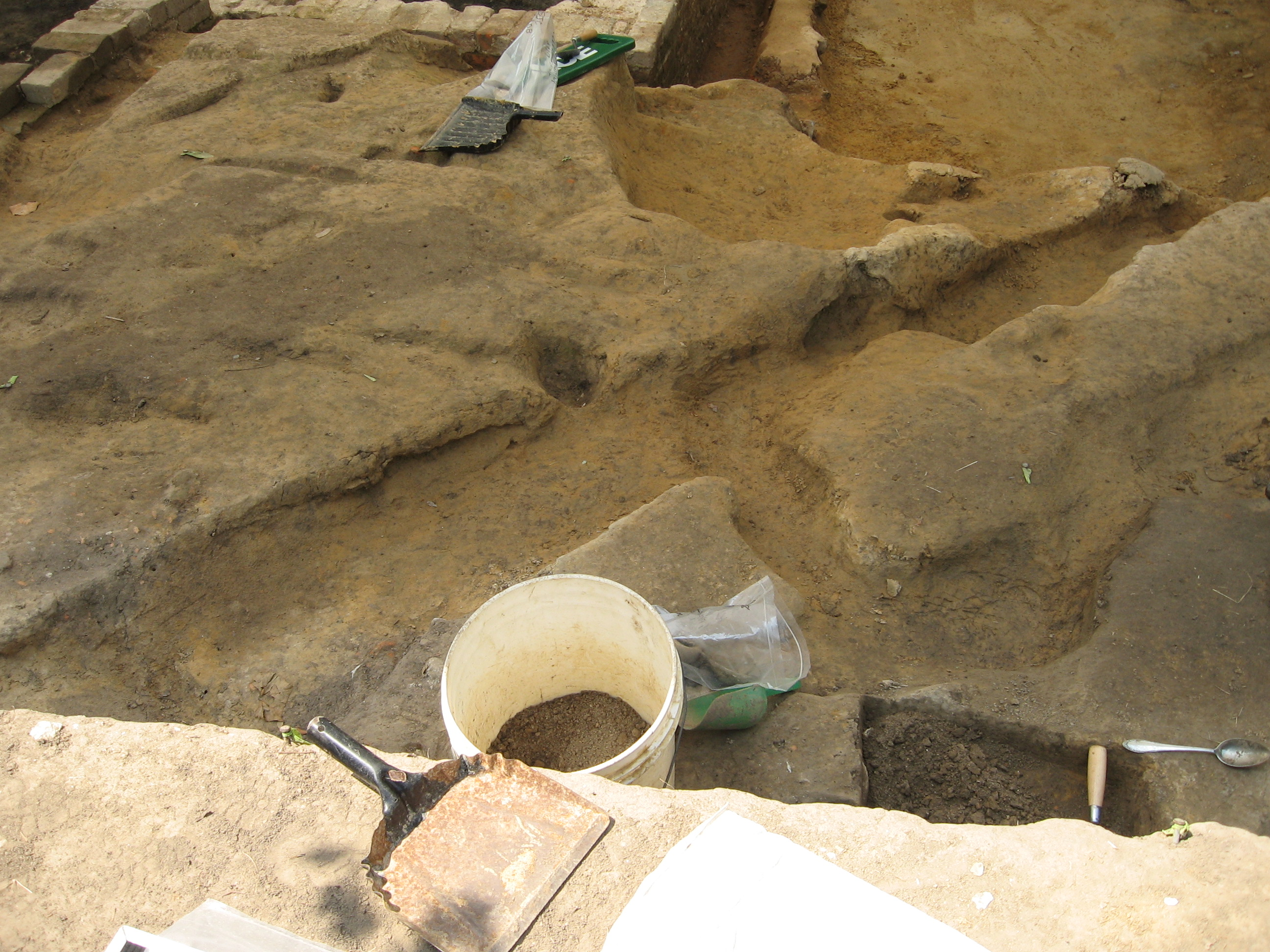
"Ravenscroft site" ruins in colonial Williamsburg, home of young Holt.

Holt was born in 1721 (exact date unknown), at colonial Williamsburg in the colony of Virginia. He received his formal schooling and training as a merchant in the colonial town. His brother-in-law, William Hunter, the "public printer", likely taught him the printing business there.

Holt first became a store shop merchant at Duke of Gloucester street in colonial Williamsburg on lots numbers 49 and 50 in a "new store" he built about 1745, now known as "Holt's storehouse" on the northeast side of the street. William Nelson obtained a loan from Holt in 1745 and gave a mortgage to his town lots numbers 266, 267, 268 as collateral. After several loans, Nelson, eventually sold the lots to the printer publisher Joseph Royle in 1763 for the amount of 500 pounds of the then current money. Royle had a house on lots 267 and 268 at the corner of Nicholson and Botetourt Streets, known today as the "Ravenscroft Site".

== Mid life ==
Holt became the mayor of colonial Williamsburg in November 1752 and served one term from 1752 to 1753. He was Justice of the Peace for York County, Virginia and also held other public positions from 1748 to 1754. In 1754 Holt had a negative cash flow problem at his Williamsburg storehouse, where he stocked general merchandise (i.e. groceries, dry goods, sewing items, china), so he gave that business up.

Holt played a role in the early history of the Connecticut Gazette. In 1755 Thomas Clap, President of Yale College, invited Benjamin Franklin to set up a printing press in New Haven, Connecticut. Benjamin Mecom, Clap's nephew, was to operate the press to publish the paper. Circumstances changed and Mecom declined to run the publication. Franklin then sold the materials to James Parker, a well-known printer who began the Connecticut Gazette on April 12, 1755; it was the first newspaper printed in the colony of Connecticut.

Holt went to Parker in the summer of 1755 with a recommendation letter from others about his skills. Parker gave him a job in the printing business helping publish the Connecticut Gazette. The front page appeared with the co-partnership name of "James Parker and Company" on December 13, 1755. Holt became the junior partner and resident editor conducting the printing business of the newspaper publication at New Haven. He also ran the New Haven post office at the same time. Parker spent most of his time at his printing-house in New York City, so was often away from his New Haven businesses, that Holt totally managed. While in New York, Holt took on William Goddard, printer and publisher, as a silent partner. Goddard, along with Benjamin Franklin would later establish the U.S. Post Office.

Holt then became one of the two deputy postmasters-general for the British American colonies. He worked with the Parker as a junior deputy based in New Haven, Connecticut. Holt moved to New York City in the early summer of 1760 to manage Parker's publishing of the newspaper the New-York Gazette and Weekly Post-Boy that then appeared with the imprint James Parker & Company, with Holt again being a junior partner and the Company referred to. The two also controlled the postriders from New York City to Hartford, who met the riders that carried the mail from the city of Boston.

Holt was quite concerned about the postal system and gave extensive improvement suggestions in a letter to Samuel Adams on January 29, 1776. The suggestions were based from the practical experience he gained as a deputy postmaster. Part of the letter suggested that the Continental Congress should adequately supply whatever was necessary to provide reliable postal service. Another suggestion Holt recommended was good delivery of all letters to and from soldiers on duty and that they might go free of postage. Holt in the New York Journal or General Advertiser newspaper was the first person in New York to recommend a newsdealers' system for the delivery of newspapers instead of using post riders, which was dangerous.

The partnership broke up on May 6, 1762. Holt then became the sole publisher and general manager of the newspaper and changed the name to New-York Journal or General Advertiser. He rented the publishing facilities from Parker on a four-year lease. He then moved to the lower end of Broad Street and Water Street, opposite the Exchange in May 1766. Holt additionally then published books and other materials (i.e. pamphlets, handbills, broadsides) that were generally political.

The publications Holt printed reflected his readers' struggle between the colonies and England. He also printed laws and other court actions for the Provincial Congress of New York. He also had a store that sold miscellaneous books on a variety of subjects including religion, freemasonry, economics, history, archaeology, poetry, and biographies. It also sold ink, paper, and other stationery supplies.

Holt openly challenged the Stamp Act of 1765 while being the publisher of the New-York Gazette and Weekly Post-Boy. He was the favorite printer of the Sons of Liberty. Holt almost stopped the publication of this newspaper because of the heavy tax he would have to pay the English for stamped paper. The Sons of Liberty, with a threat of bodily harm, persuaded Holt to continue the newspaper in defiance of the tax. Holt then continued the newspaper on unstamped paper and even published for meetings of groups against the Stamp Act. He added to the heading of his newspaper the words,

The united voice of all his Majesty's free and loyal subjects in America – Liberty and property and no stamps.

Holt had a close relationship with the Sons of Liberty, which helped him get printing equipment. Once, they bailed him out of debtor's jail with a fee of over £400. The Sons of Liberty even subsidized him to publish the New-York Gazette and Weekly Post-Boy as a Whig newspaper. He changed the name of the paper to New-York Gazette or General Advertiser in May 1766, where he printed his relationship with Parker. Holt learned that Parker would not resume the New-York Gazette and Weekly Post-Boy, so he continued the newspaper using the title until October 9, 1766 (no. 1240). On October 16 of the same year Holt changed the title to New-York Gazette or General Advertiser (no. 1241) and Parker then followed suit with the same number and printed his version of the New-York Gazette or General Advertiser. Parker resumed his original newspaper that he had owned before leasing it to Holt. Holt's newspaper (issue number 1756) discontinued in New York City on August 29, 1776. This was when the British troops were about to occupy New York City. Holt made a fast exit from the city to New Haven, Connecticut, just as the British occupied New York City, leaving behind all his printing equipment and materials, which the British destroyed.

Holt went into the printing business in Norfolk, Virginia, in 1770, in a shop supervised by his son John Hunter. Holt ran the printing business under his son's name "John H. Holt and Company." There he printed the Virginia Gazette (aka the Norfolk Intelligencer). Holt printed some unfavorable remarks about certain ancestors of Lord Dunmore and started a quarrel with him, the royal governor of the colony of Virginia. Dunmore sent fifteen of King George's soldiers to Holt's printing shop and took all of the types and parts of the printing press. In the presence of two to three hundred spectators the soldiers took these printing accessories and carried them back onto Dunmore's ship offshore. It was rumored that Dunmore wanted to print newspapers himself in vindication. However, he had no ink and only parts of a press, so was unable to print. The soldiers were looking for Holt's son to capture but could not find him as he was hiding and eventually escaped the territory.

Holt then moved from Connecticut with his family in 1777 and went to Kingston, New York. There he became "public printer" for the colony of New York. Holt revived his newspaper in Kingston on July 7, 1777, starting with issue number 1757. He printed it until October 13, 1777, ending with issue number 1771. This was three days before the British burned down Kingston. He was only able to save of his personal property and about a sixth of his printing materials, which included his account books, paper stock and two excellent font type sets.

Holt again continued his newspaper on May 11, 1778, in Poughkeepsie, New York. In this town his newspaper was printed until November 6, 1780. It then restarted on July 30, 1781, and stopped on January 6, 1782. This time the reason it stopped was for the need of printing laws of the Colony of New York. It then resumed again on November 22, 1783, being titled The Independent New-York Gazette. Holt's newspaper was printed then for the rest of his life under this title and variations of that. He criticized British "tyrannical designs" and taught the colonists how to resist British control. Modern-day historian Edwin Emery labeled Holt "the most important Radical printer outside Boston" during the American Revolution. Isaiah Thomas, founder of the American Antiquarian Society, described Holt as a "man of ardent feelings, and a high churchman, but a firm Whig, a good writer, and a warm advocate of the cause of his country."

Holt had a problem collecting newspaper fees for some fifty years. An example was his attempt to collect subscription fees and advertisement fees from Jonathan Trumbull. Trumbull not only ordered the newspaper subscription on a yearly basis for himself, but ordered it for eleven others, and didn't pay for any of them.

== Personal life and death ==
Holt died in New York City after a lingering illness on January 30, 1784. He is buried in the churchyard of St. Paul's Chapel in New York. After Holt's death in 1784 his widow continued the Independent New-York Gazette newspaper until her death in 1788, when it passed to others and was published until March 8, 1800. Holt's widow also had a lawsuit against the State of New York for unpaid public printing done by Holt during the Revolutionary War. Holt was a member of Sons of Liberty of New York, and Burton Parish Church of colonial Williamsburg.

=== Family ===
Holt married Elizabeth Hunter, sister to the colonial Williamsburg publisher William Hunter, in 1744. According to biographer Layton Barnes Murphy they had two children:

- Elizabeth Holt (b. April 19, 1746), married Eleazer Oswald (editor of Philadelphia Independent Gazette).
- John Hunter Holt (b. July 1748), became publisher of the Virginia Gazette or the Norfolk Intelligencer.

== Works ==
Major publications:

- Connecticut Gazette, James Parker & Company (1755-1760)
- New York Gazette and Weekly Post-Boy (1762–1766)
- New York Journal or General Advertiser (1766–1782)
- Independent New-York Gazette or the New York Journal Revived (1783–1784)

Printed examples of works contributed to Holt:

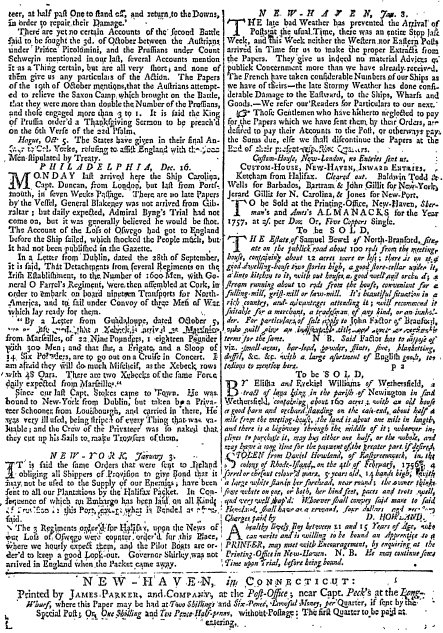
Connecticut Gazette
James Parker & Company
Jan 6, 1756

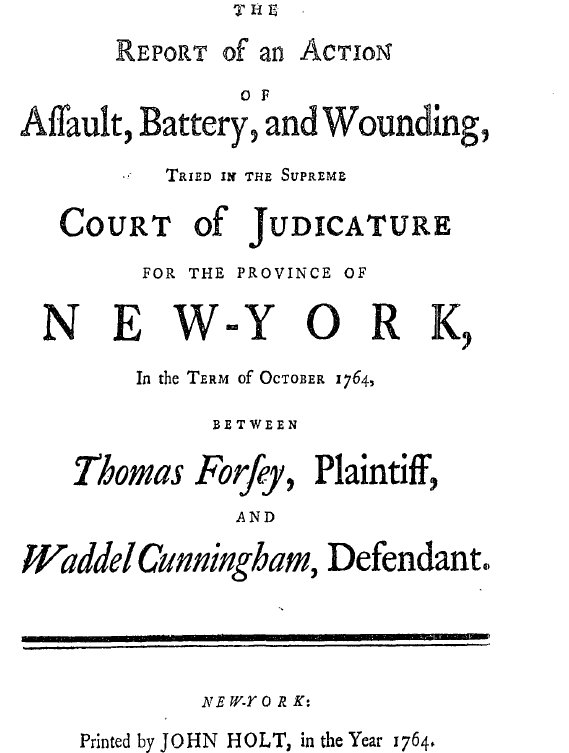
The Report of Action of
Assault, Battery, Wounding
Oct 1764

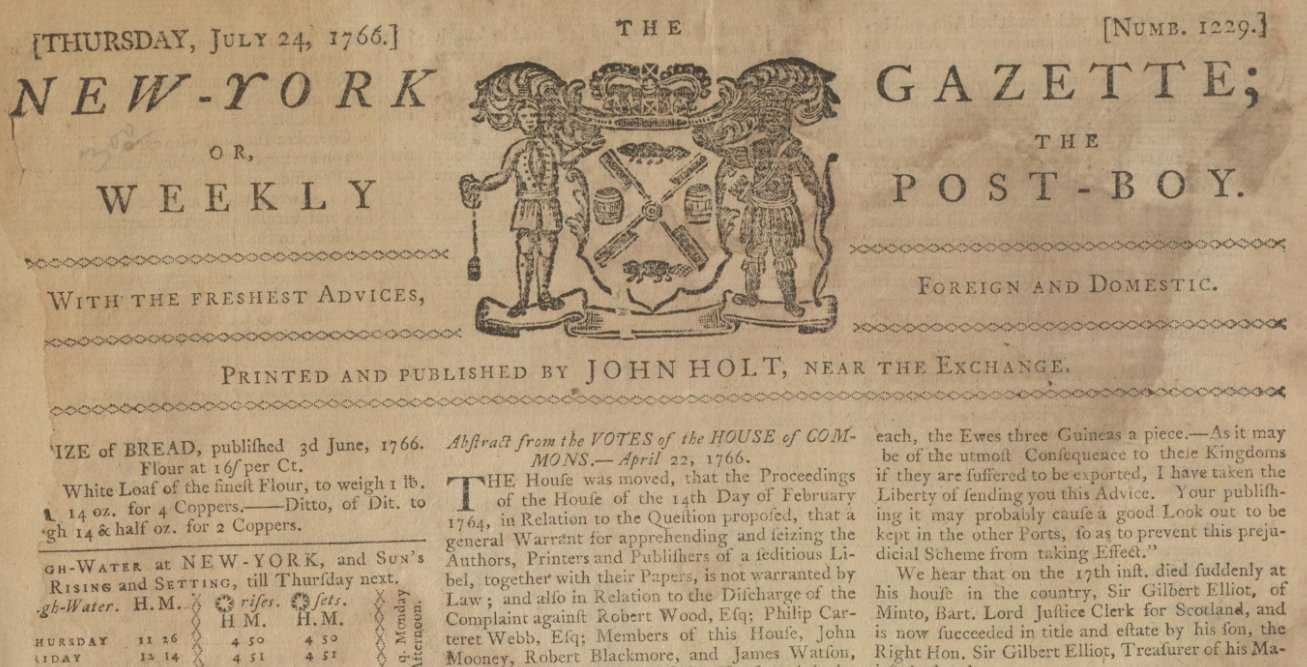
New York Gazette or The Weekly Post-Boy
Jul 24 1766

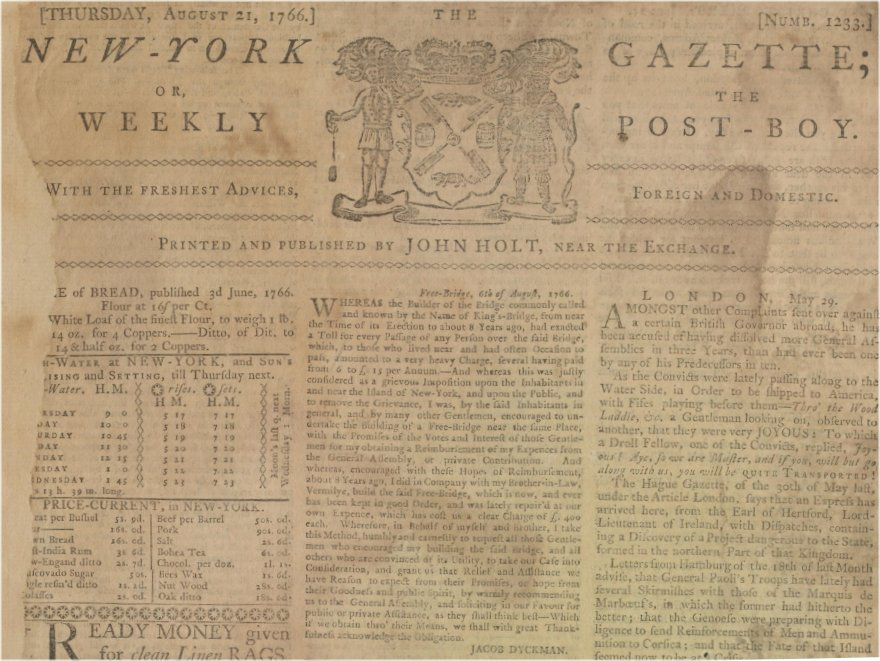
New York Gazette or The Weekly Post-Boy
Aug 21 1766
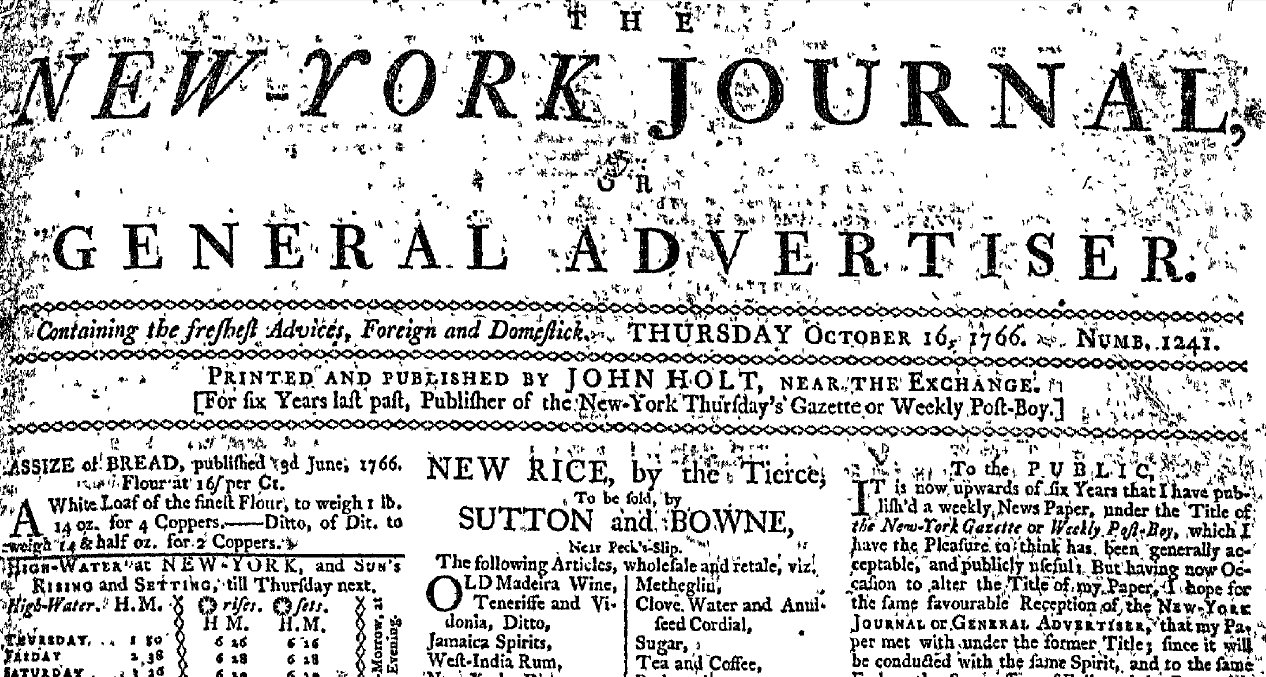
New York Journal or General Advertiser
Oct 16 1766

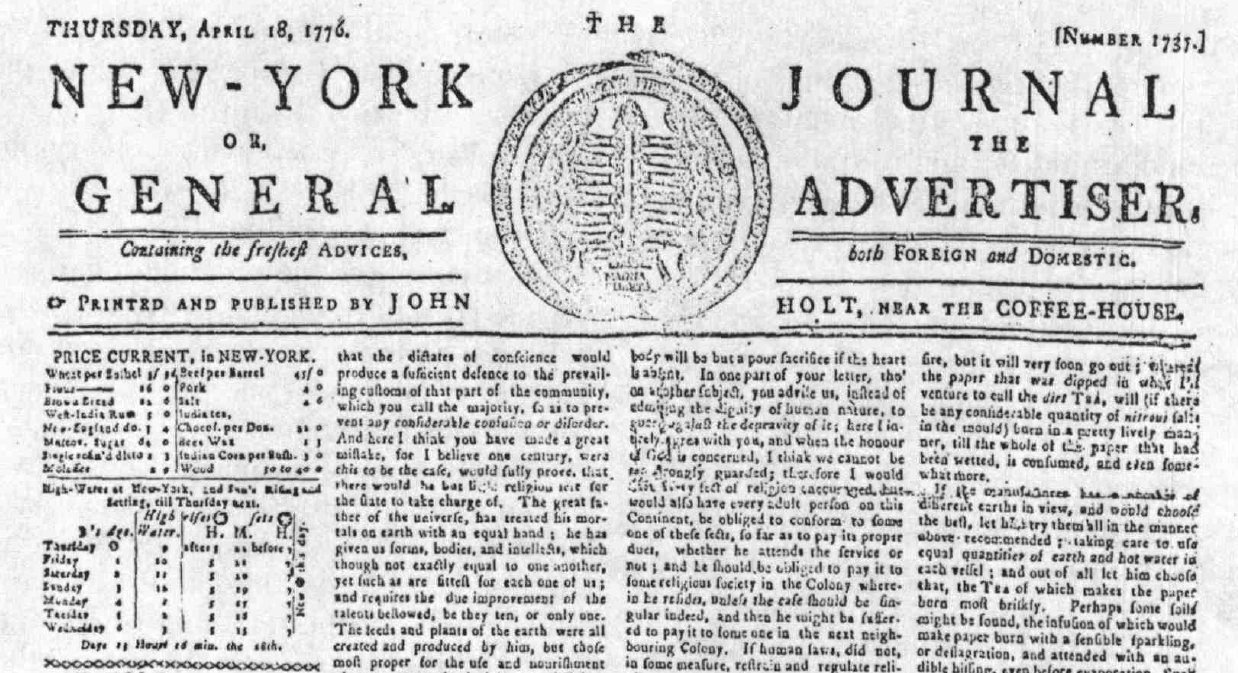
New York Journal or the General Advertiser
Apr 18 1776

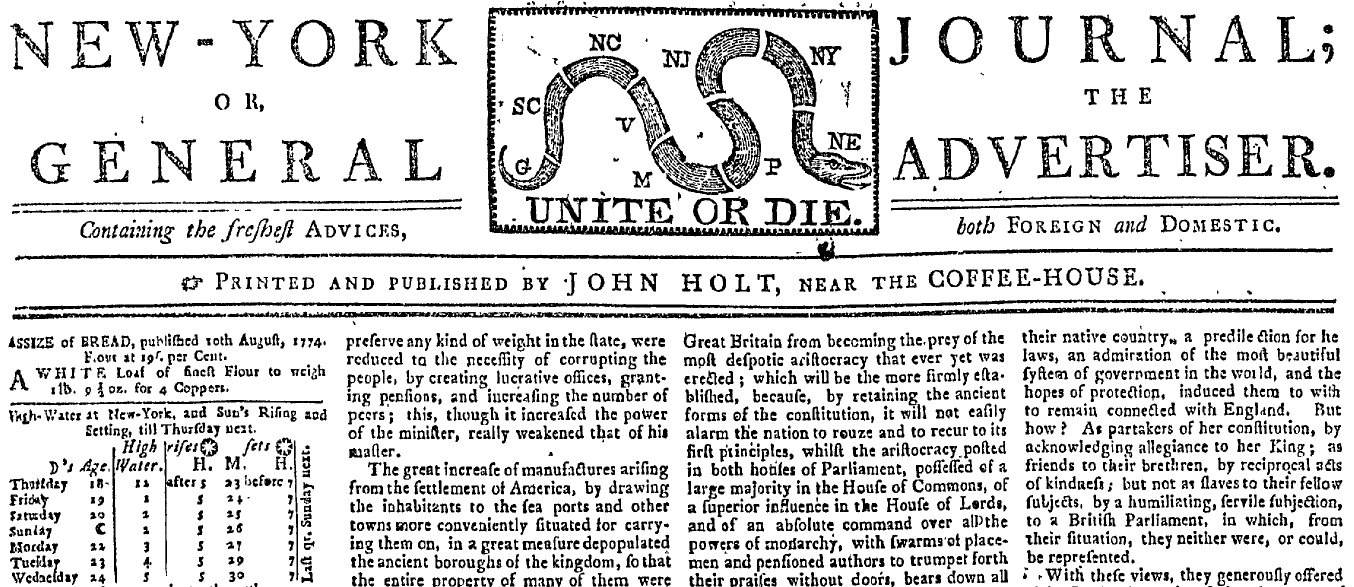
New York Journal or General Advertiser
Aug 25 1774

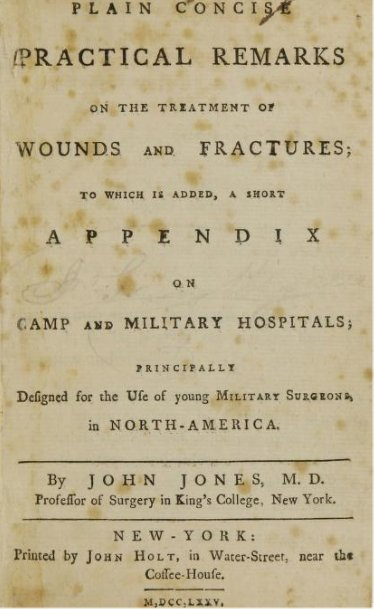
Practical Remarks on the treatment of wounds ...
1775

== See also ==
- Early American publishers and printers
- List of early American publishers and printers

== Bibliography ==
- Ashley, Perry J. (1985). American Newspaper Journalists, 1690–1872 / Dictionary of Literary Biography Vol. 43. Detroit, MI: Gale Research.
- Colonial Williamsburg, inc (1972). Official Guidebook: Containing a Brief History of the City and Descriptions of More Than One Hundred Dwelling-houses, Shops & Publick Buildings. Williamsburg, Virginia: Colonial Williamsburg, Incorporated.
- Eisenstadt, Peter R. (2005). The Encyclopedia of New York State. Syracuse, New York: Syracuse University Press. ISBN 081560808X.
- Emery, Edwin (1978). The press and America. Prentice-Hall. ISBN 0136979793.
- Faragher, John Mack (1996). Encyclopedia Of Colonial & Revolutionary America. Da Capo Press. ISBN 9780306806872.
- Featherston, James S. (1985). American Newspaper Journalists, 1690–1872 / Dictionary of Literary Biography Vol. 43. Detroit, MI: Gale Research.
- Frasca, Ralph (2006). Benjamin Franklin's Printing Network: Disseminating Virtue in Early America. University of Missouri Press. ISBN 0826264921.
- Malone, Dumas (1932). Dictionary of American Biography, volume IX (Hibben-Jarvis). New York: Charles Scribner's Sons.
- McKerns, Joseph P. (1989). Biographical Dictionary of American Journalism. Greenwood. ISBN 978-0-313-23819-2.
- Morgan, Edmund Sears (1953). The Stamp Act Crisis: Prologue to Revolution. Institute of Early American History and Culture (Williamsburg, Va.): UNC Press Books. ISBN 0807899798.
- New York Public Library (1899). The New York Genealogical and Biographical Record, Volumes 29–30. New York Genealogical and Biographical Society.
- Oswald, John Clyde (1965). Printing in the Americas, Volume 1. Kennikat Press.
- Paltsits, Victor Hugo (1898). The New York Genealogical and Biographical Record, Volumes 29–30. New York Genealogical and Biographical Society.
- Paltsits, Victor Hugo (1920). John Holt, printer & postmaster. New York, Public library.
- Williams, Julie Hedgepeth (1999). Printed Word in Early America. Greenwood Publishing Group.
