= Parson's Cause =

1760s political dispute in British Virginia

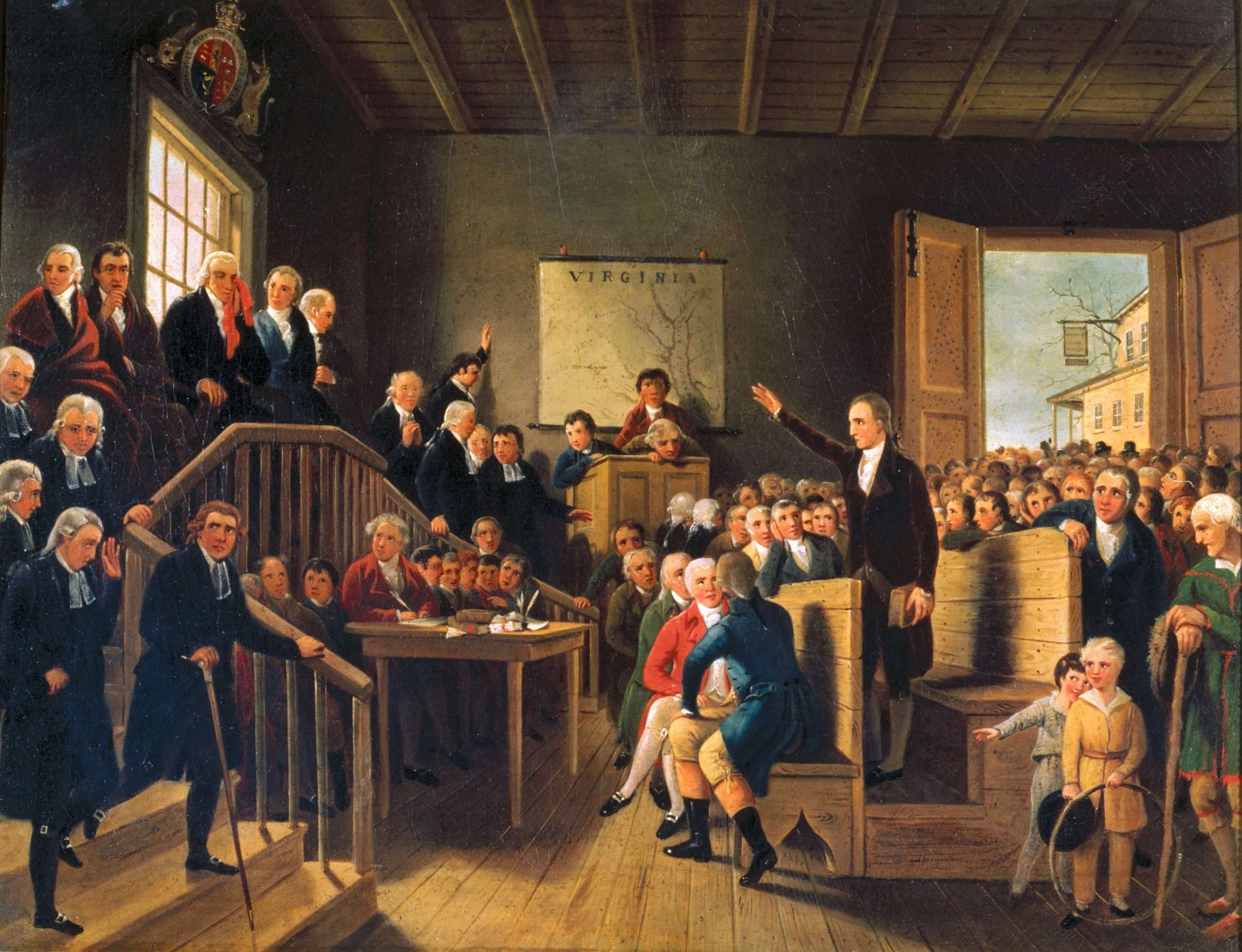
George Cooke's 1834 depiction of Patrick Henry arguing the "Parson's Cause" case at the Hanover County Courthouse.

The Parson's Cause was a legal and political dispute in the British colony of Virginia often viewed as an important event leading up to the American Revolution. Colonel John Henry, father of Patrick Henry, was the judge who presided over the court case and jury that decided the issue. The relatively unknown Patrick Henry advocated in favor of colonial rights in the case.

In 1758, the House of Burgesses passed the Two Penny Act. According to legislation passed in 1748, Virginia's Anglican clergy were to be paid 16,000 pounds (7,300 kg) of tobacco per year, the colony's primary cash crop. Following a poor harvest in 1758, the price of tobacco rose from two to six pennies per pound, effectively inflating clerical salaries. The House of Burgesses responded by passing legislation allowing debts in tobacco to be paid in currency at a rate of two pennies per pound. King George III vetoed the law on the Board of Trade's recommendation, causing an uproar in the colony. Several Virginian politicians saw the king's veto as a breach of their legislative authority.

Anglican minister James Maury had sued in Hanover County Court on April 1, 1762, for back wages on behalf of all the ministers involved, and he effectively became a representative of the Crown's cause. The court ruled on November 5, 1763, that Maury's claim was valid, but that the amount of damages had to be determined by a jury, which was called for in December 1763. Patrick Henry, then relatively unknown, rose to prominence by defending Hanover County against Maury's claims. Henry argued in favor of the Two Penny Act. As Maury wrote on December 12, 1763, in a letter to fellow Anglican minister John Camm shortly after the trial, Henry argued "that a King, by disallowing Acts of this salutary nature, from being the father of his people, degenerated into a Tyrant and forfeits all right to his subjects' obedience."

The jury awarded Maury one penny in damages. The award essentially nullified the king's veto, and no other clergy sued. The Hanover County Courthouse is still operating; historic U.S. Route 301 passes by it. The courthouse is adjacent to the Hanover Tavern, where Patrick Henry lodged while arguing the Parson's Cause, and is the third oldest courthouse still in use in the United States. The state historic office dates the building's construction between 1737 and 1742.

== See also ==
- History of Virginia
