= Elizabeth Hunter Holt =

- Born: Elizabeth Hunter; 1726; Yorktown, Virginia
- Died: March 6, 1788 (aged 61–62); Philadelphia, Pennsylvania
- Resting place: Christ church burial ground, Pennsylvania

Elizabeth Hunter Holt (née Hunter; 1726–1788) was a colonial American newspaper publisher from the U.S. state of Virginia.

== Biography ==
Elizabeth Hunter Holt was the sister of William Hunter of Yorktown, Virginia. She married John Holt (1726–1784) of Williamsburg, Virginia, whom she succeeded at the New York Journal, which for a short time was renamed the Independent New York Gazette. They had a son, John Hunter Holt (d. 1787) and a daughter, Elizabeth Oswald, who was also a publisher. In 1784, she was named New York state printer.
