= William Parks (publisher) =

British printer and publisher (1699–1750)

- Born: May 23, 1699; Shropshire, England
- Died: April 1, 1750 (aged 50)
- Resting place: Gosport, England
- Occupation: printer
- Known for: publisher in colonial America
- Spouse: Eleanor
- Children: William Parks Jr. (christened March 20, 1720); Eleanor (christened July 1721)
- Parent(s): William Parks (Sr.); Susanna (Lowe) Parks

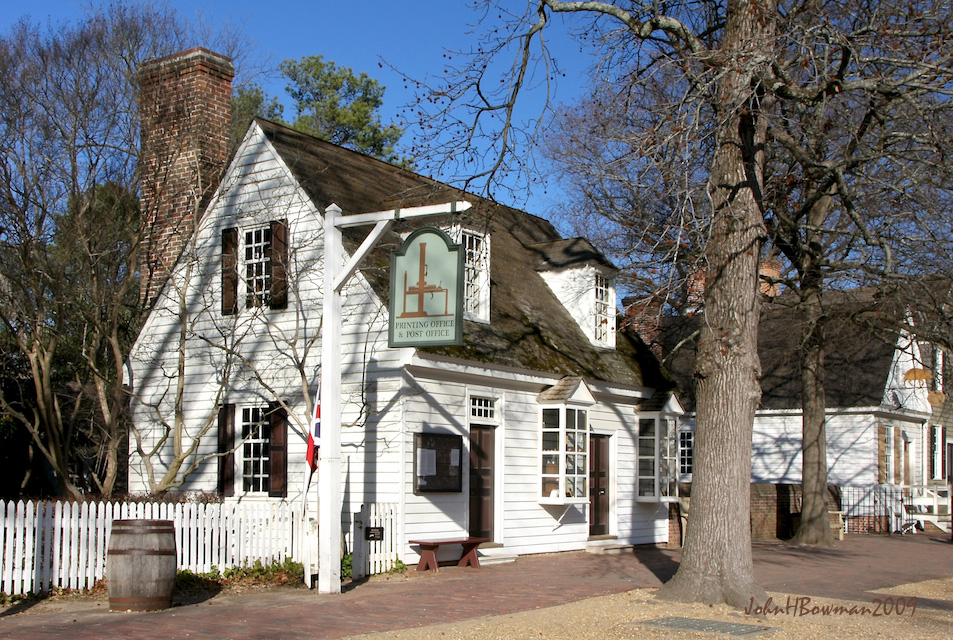
Reconstruction of Parks' print shop and post office at Colonial Williamsburg

William Parks (May 23, 1699 – April 1, 1750) was an 18th-century printer and journalist in England and Colonial America. He was the first printer in Maryland authorized as the official printer for the colonial government. He published the first newspaper in the Southern American colonies, the Maryland Gazette. He later became authorized as the official printer for the colonial government of Virginia. Parks was also the publisher and printer of the first official collection of the authentic 1733 set of Virginia's laws, and the first colonial publisher and proprietor of The Virginia Gazette newspaper. During his lifetime Parks established four new newspapers in the colonies. He also worked with Benjamin Franklin on several projects related to printing, most notably, the establishment of a paper mill in Virginia, the first such mill south of Pennsylvania.

== Early life ==
Parks was born in Ludlow, Shropshire, England on May 23, 1699. He learned printing as a trade and maintained printing houses at Ludlow, Hereford and Reading. It is uncertain whether Parks learned the printing trade in London or as an apprentice in one of the many provincial printing establishments in England. Update: In research conducted in September 1990 in the Internal Revenue Registers of the Public Records Office, Kew London, Harold Bledsoe Gill, Jr. found that William Parks was apprenticed in 1710 to Stephen Bryan of Worcester City for a period of seven years. In this record, William is identified as the son of William Parks of Stoak, Milbrough, Salop, a yeoman. In Ludlow, Parks was doing general printing prior to 1719 and started publishing the Ludlow Post-Man on October 9, 1719. This was five days after Daniel Defoe starting publishing the London newspaper Daily Post of which Parks copied directly several paragraphs of it without acknowledgement. In 1719 Parks printed the first edition and 1720 the second edition of a small collection of sermons entitled The most important question, What is Truth by the preacher Samuel Jones of St Chad's Church in the county town of Shropshire in Shrewsbury, England. The 24 page book was the first book published at Ludlow. In 1720 he issued the announcement of a Prospect of the Demi Collediate Church of Ludlow and sold for one shilling each.

Parks and his wife Eleanor were married December 25, 1719. There is a March 20, 1720, baptismal record at the Ludlow Parish Register of William, son of William Parks and Elianor. The name of Park's wife given in the baptismal record indicates that he is the same printer later connected to Annapolis and Williamsburg in the Thirteen Colonies, as Parks gave his wife's name in his will as Eleanor. In 1721 he moved to Hereford where he published two books. In July 1723 Parks operated a printing business in Reading, where he published the Reading Mercury with one D. Kinnier.

== Immigration to America ==
Parks eventually immigrated to colonial America in 1726, starting a print shop in Annapolis, Maryland. He began publishing Maryland government documents then and published the Acts of the Assembly for the colony soon thereafter. In October, 1727 he became the first "public printer" (aka: "printer to the public") for the government of the colonial of Maryland, and was commissioned to print all government documents. He did this until 1733 and was paid £200 yearly. In 1727, he began publishing the first newspaper in the Southern colonies, The Maryland Gazette, which carried news from the other colonies and England. Also then Parks published the first political pamphlet in the region. It was composed by an anonymous writer and argued in favor of controversial tobacco regulation. It laid the groundwork for a move away from private debate by only the political elite rulers toward public discussion of political matters, while encouraging others to get involved in such public discourse. The publicizing of the political decision introduced the medium of print as a vehicle for civil discourse and broadening political decision-making more toward a government by the people for the people.

Parks soon became postmaster in Annapolis. His print shop also served as the stage coach stop in Annapolis. The Philadelphia American Weekly Mercury newspaper featured an advertisement on April 4, 1728, which mentions the stagecoach stopping in Annapolis at Parks's post office for the sending and receiving of individual letters and packets of letters. Neighboring Virginia had been the first state settled in the American colonies, but there was no government consent to having a printing-office at the time. The British government, along with colonial governor, Sir William Berkeley, were opposed initially to the introduction of printing in that colony. In 1729 however, the Virginia government invited Parks to come to Virginia, a colony of 114,000 people, to print all the laws and public periodicals, paying the same as he received in Maryland, which was increased later.

Parks established a print shop in Colonial Williamsburg near the Capitol building on the main street known as the Duke of Gloucester. It was the first permanent printing establishment in the colonies and kept the surrounding colonies informed on the latest news. In addition to the Gazette, Parks printed books, pamphlets and tracts. Surviving examples of his work show that his first publications were printed with Dutch type, but were eventually replaced with a better type forged in England by William Caslon. While in Williamsburg Parks printed The Laws of Virginia in 1729 for the government of the Virginia colony, along with a work about the history of Virginia. During this time he was printing for both the Virginia and Maryland colonial governments, but later ended his service for Maryland in 1733. Later he moved to the print shop familiar today as the tourist attraction on lot 48. It is a two-story building and served as Virginia's post office and Williamsburg's bookshop, stationery store, and book bindery. The Parks family lived above the shop for their home.

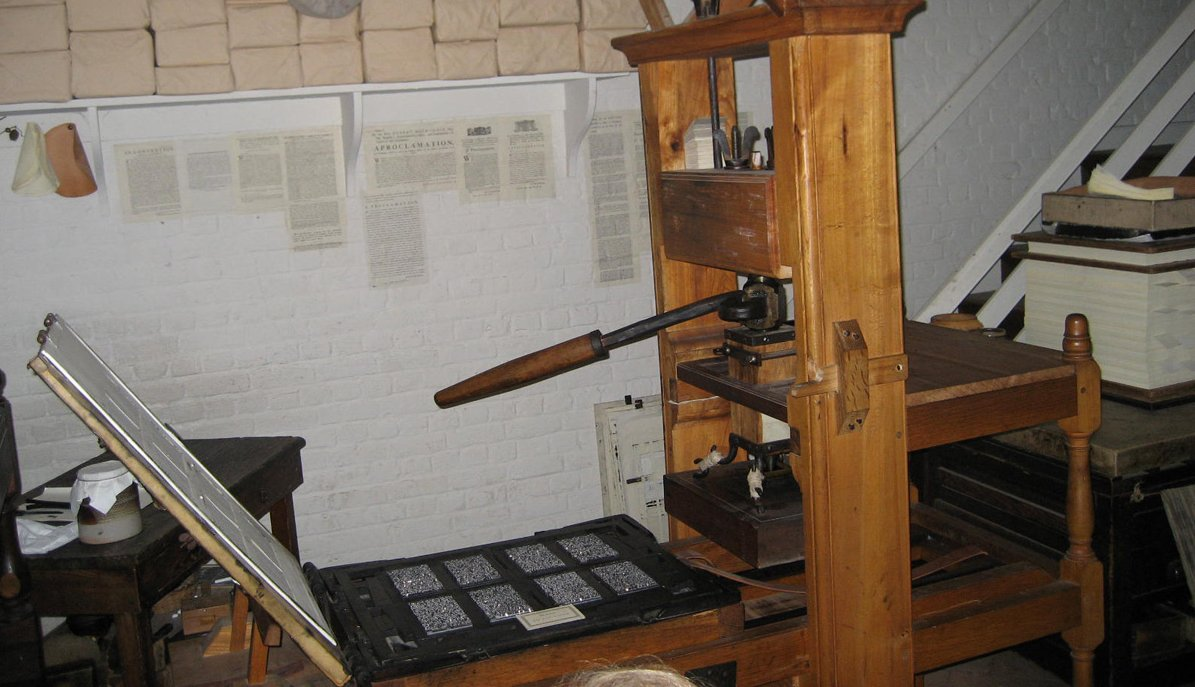
Colonial Williamsburg printing press

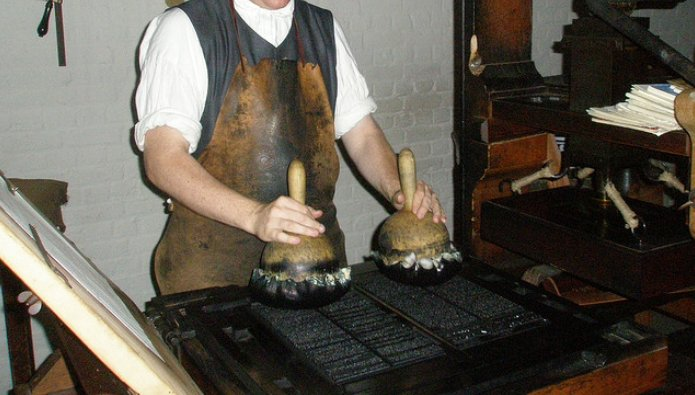
Inking the press types

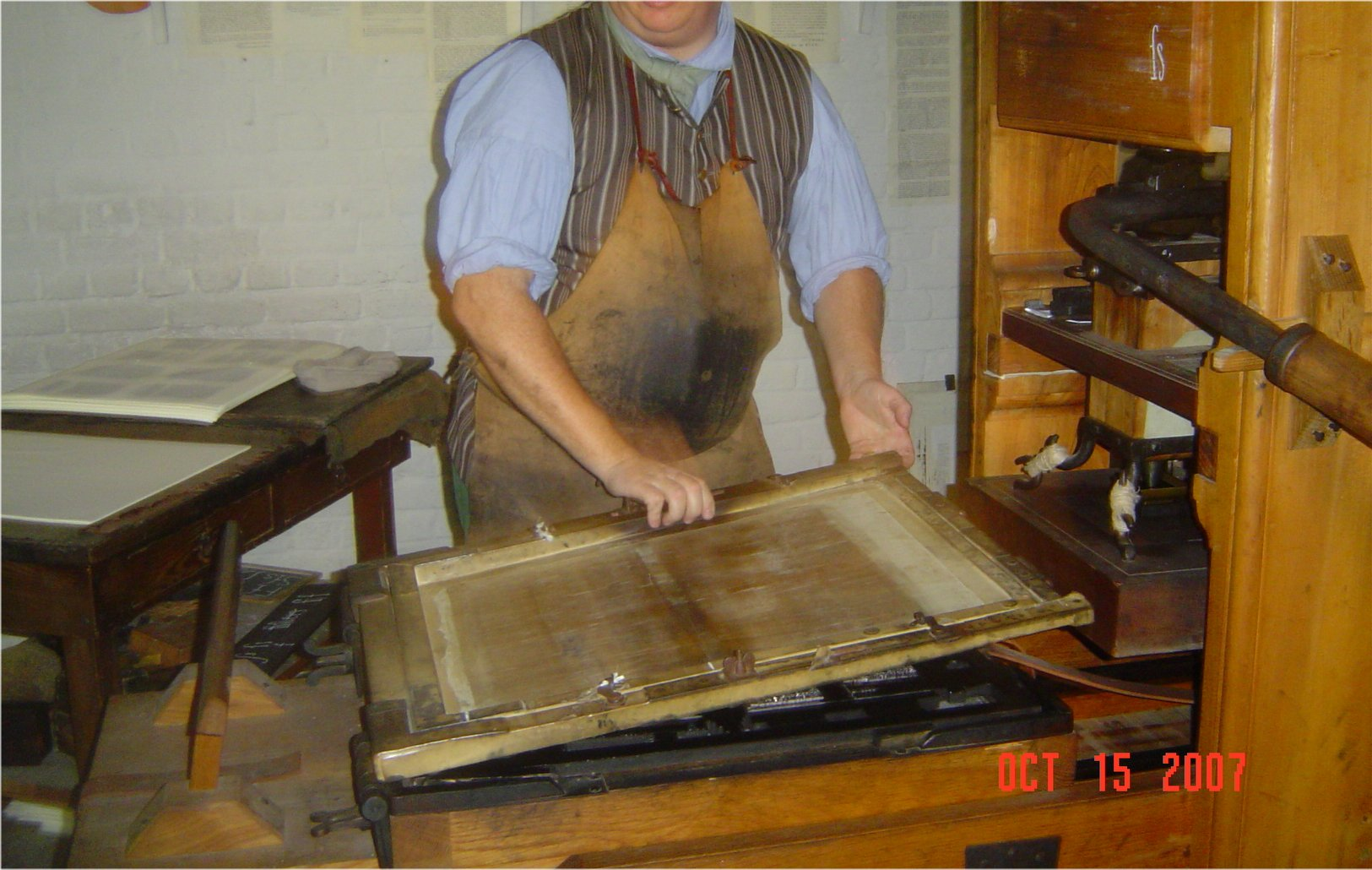
Printing work replicated

== Williamsburg paper mill ==
The history of Parks's Williamsburg paper mill began with his journey to Philadelphia in the fall of 1742 to seek opinions from Benjamin Franklin and discuss how to go about such a project. Franklin then advertised in the Pennsylvania Gazette for a contractor who knew about building a paper mill, and for associated craftsmen. Together, Parks and Franklin interviewed various people who responded to the ad. When Parks had to return to Williamsburg, he left Franklin in charge as his agent. Franklin hired a German contractor (Johan Conrad Shutz or "Scheetz") who knew how to build a paper mill, and hired skilled craftsmen. Franklin also obtained paper making equipment and furnished Parks with rags for making paper. Construction of Virginia's first paper mill was on Archer's Hope Creek, and completed sometime in 1743. At times Parks employed as many as nine assistants for his paper mill and nearby Williamsburg print shop. Historian Lawrence Wroth maintains that Parks' paper mill was not fully established until 1744.

Parks advertised in the Gazette for additional rags for his paper making on July 26, 1744, and appealed to its readers to collect rags for paper-making with a poem he published therein:

Nice Delia's Smock, which neat and whole,
No man durst finger for his soul;
Turn'd to Gazette, now all the town,
May take it up, or smooth it down.
Whilst Delia may with it dispense,
And no Affront to Innocence.

The Williamsburg paper mill established by Parks was the first paper mill in colonial America south of Pennsylvania. Historian J. A. Leo Lemay has speculated that the reason Franklin was so interested in seeing Parks getting started in the paper making business is that he wanted to promote American industry. According to this theory, Franklin saw that Parks had already opened a print shop in England, Annapolis, and Williamsburg and wished him to get involved in making paper, since he was a good businessman and his endeavors would benefit commerce in the long run.

It is not clear as to what capacity the mill continued to operate in the years immediately following the death of Parks in 1750. Williamsburg historian Rutherfoord Goodwin speculated that it may have been taken over by William Hunter, the deputy postmaster-general under Benjamin Franklin who had served as Parks's main assistant. Hunter also revived The Virginia Gazette in February, 1751 as the new proprietor who had bought the paper from Franklin, but generally did not employ its use much. Thus it is also possible that Parks's paper mill was shut down and the equipment sold from the estate to Johan Conrad Shutz, the German contractor, for his new Pennsylvania mill.

== Works ==
Parks's major printing production as an official government printer consisted of the 1733 Virginia Code, fourteen volumes of Acts of Assembly, and ten volumes of the Journal of the Burgesses House. He also printed John Mercer's extensive Exact Abridgement of All Public Acts of Virginia (1737, 1739) and New Kent County justice George Webb's sizable edition of The Office Authority of Justice of the Peace (1736). Parks printed The Charter of William & Mary College published in 1736. A copy of the statutes are housed at the Library of Congress. He was commissioned to print a second copy of the statutes in 1744. Parks also did the book binding for this work. He advertised himself as one "Who binds old Books very well, and cheap." He also printed a Virginia Almanack with was used by the colonists for accounting journals. He published in 1742 one of the first cookbooks, which was titled The Compleat Housewife authored by one E. Smith. Parks also published playbills announcing theatricals at the first Williamsburg theater. Parks established four new newspapers in his lifetime. Two were in England: the Ludlow Post-Man and the Reading Mercury. Two were in Colonial America: the Maryland Gazette and the Virginia Gazette.

Parks has been given credit for these "firsts" -

Newspaper in Virginia.
Postmaster of Virginia.
Newspaper in Maryland.
Literary works in Virginia.
Paper factory south of Pennsylvania.

Despite Parks's extensive practice of printing legal documents and records for the colonial governments in Maryland and Virginia, there remain few personal manuscripts or letters in his own handwriting that have survived over the years. One of the few examples are housed in the library of the Maryland Historical Society; a letter addressed to Dr. Charles Carroll, Annapolis, a member of the Maryland Assembly, and a close relative of the Charles Carroll who was one of the signers of the Declaration of Independence. The letter concerns itself with the Maryland Assembly and its involvement in the establishment of an ironworks in that colony. Parks was the printer who was asked by Carroll to record and print the legal proceedings involved and, feeling duty bound, traveled from Williamsburg to Annapolis in 1732 to do so.

=== Connection between American and English historical evidence ===
There is circumstantial evidence that Parks of Colonial America is the same William Parks of Ludlow in England. Besides both having the same wife'e name, both had the same trade with consecutive periods of activity which were similar in nature related to being a printer and newspaper publisher. In the inventory of the American Parks' estate is a negro slave named Ludlow. Parks' estate of 1,550 acres in Prince George's County, Maryland, surveyed in 1731 for him was named "Park Hill" at the time. At the towns of Oswestry and Bitterley in the county of Shropshire in England are well known famed estates with the same name. The list of subscribers to the Collection of the Acts of Virginia, published by American Parks in 1733, has a set of names of thirty-seven residents of England of which seven were past residents of Shropshire and one from Bitterley.

== Final years ==
On March 23, 1750, Parks traveled on the passenger ship Nelson going to England to collect additional supplies for his printing press in Virginia. On April 1, while still on board, he died of pleurisy. He is buried in Gosport, England. Before embarking on his voyage Parks placed his junior partner, William Hunter, in charge of printing operations.

Parks had made out a last will and testament on March 13, 1750 (about two weeks before his death) which was witnessed and signed by four persons not related. The will was read at a Court held in York County on June 18, 1750. The executor of his estate was John Shelton. Parks left his sister Jane Spitsburg "fifty pounds current money of Virginia". To her children he bequeathed £100 to be divided equally. He bequeathed £50 to his sister Elizabeth. The will also provided the necessary funds to satisfy all of Parks' debts. There were several other lesser details involving agreements and settlements outlined in the will.

== Examples of Parks' publications ==
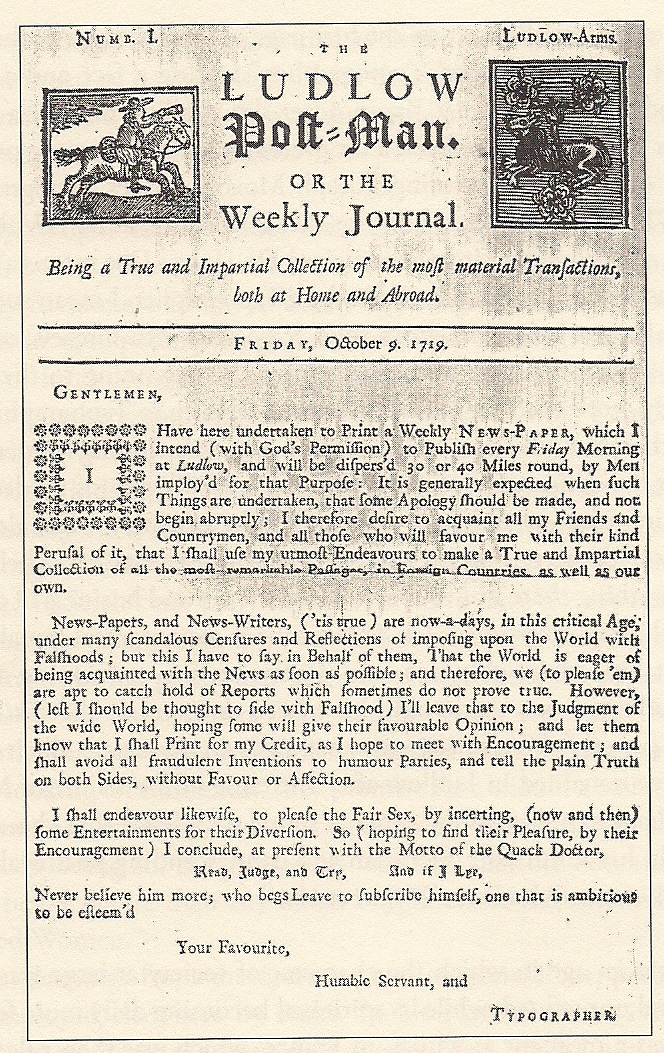
1719 British newspaper "The Ludlow Post-Man"

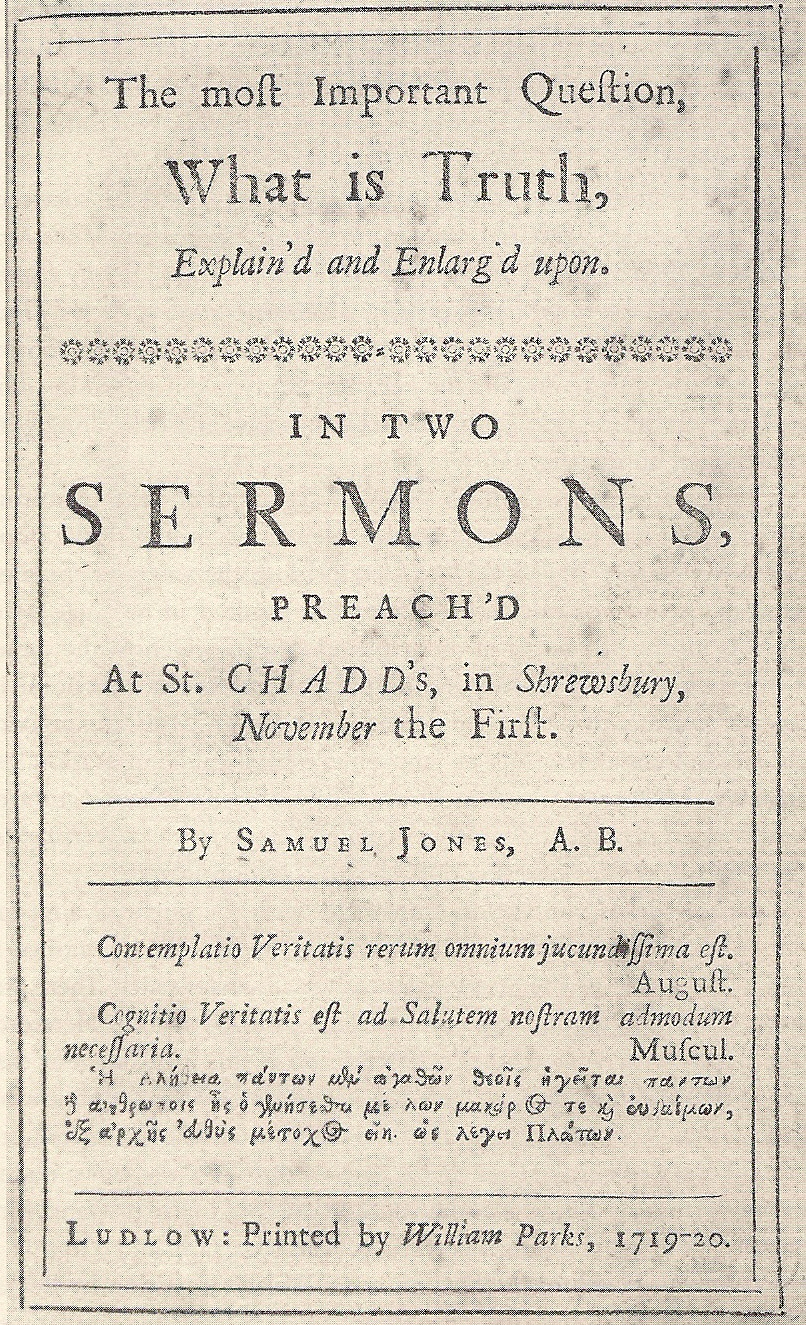
1720 The most Important Question What is Truth Explained and Enlarged

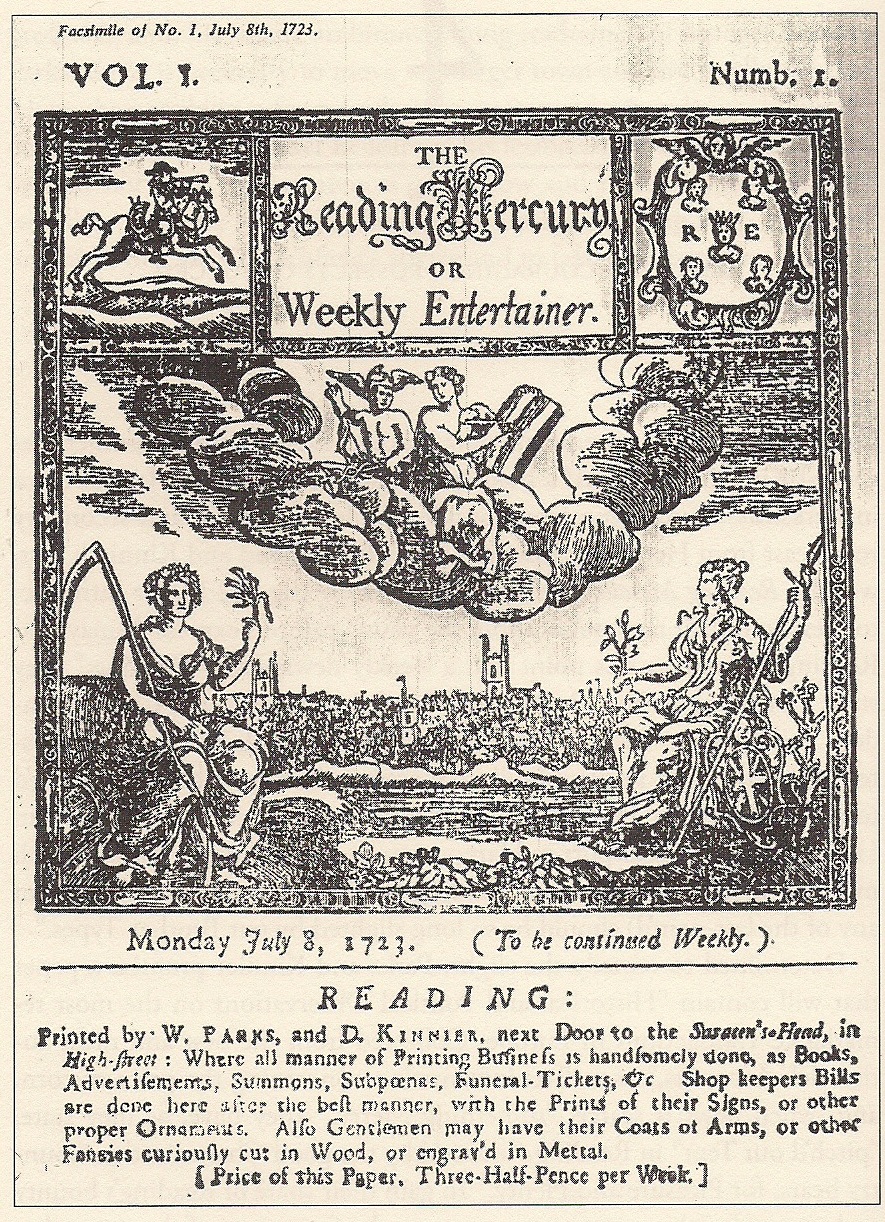
1723 British newspaper
"Reading Mercury"

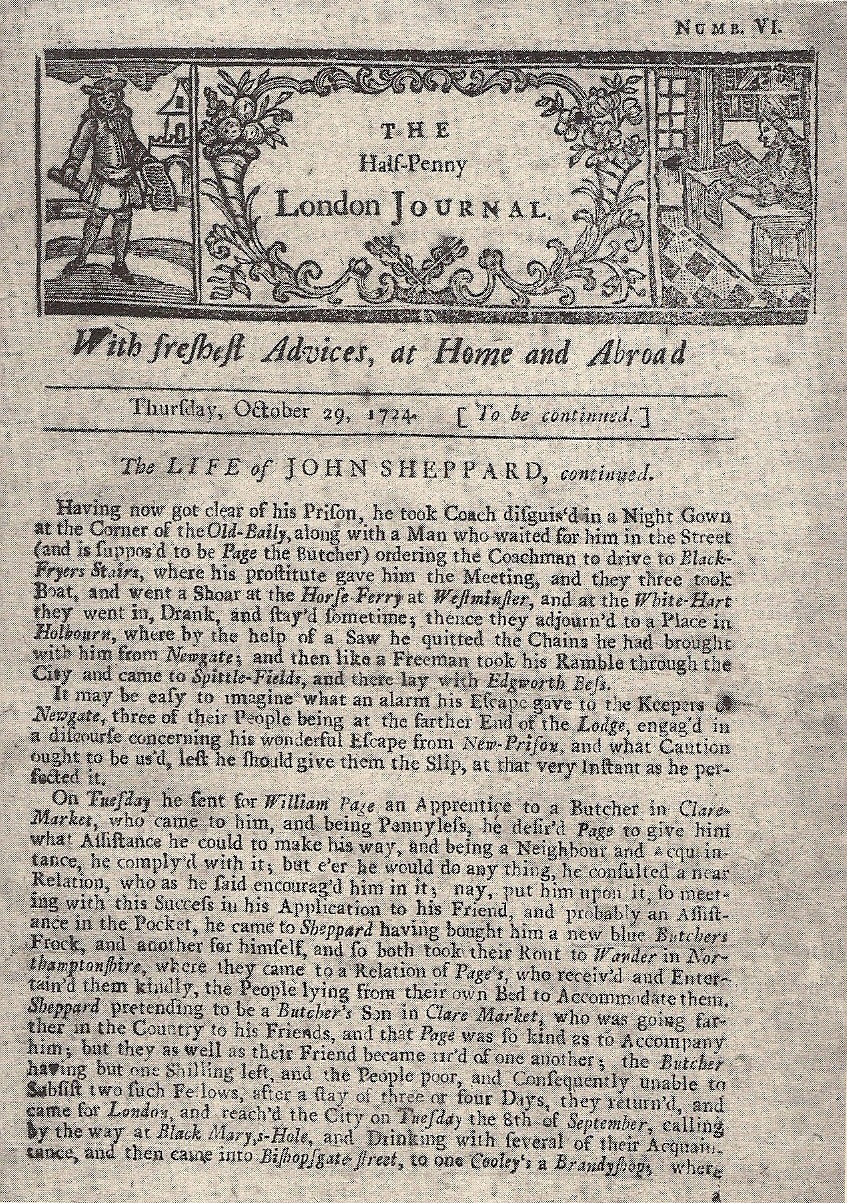
1724 Parks' British newspaper "Half-Penny London Journal"

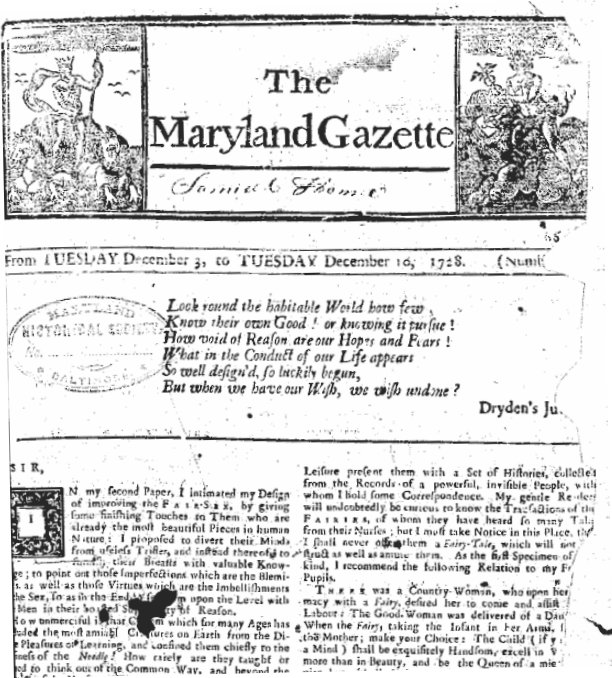
Maryland Gazette
Dec 3 – 10, 1728

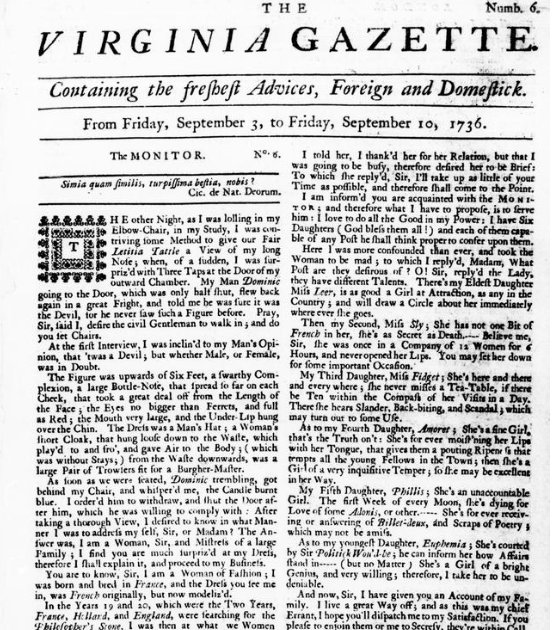
Virginia Gazette
Sept 3–10, 1736

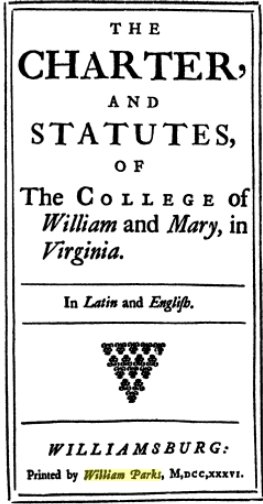
College of William & Mary charter and statutes 1736

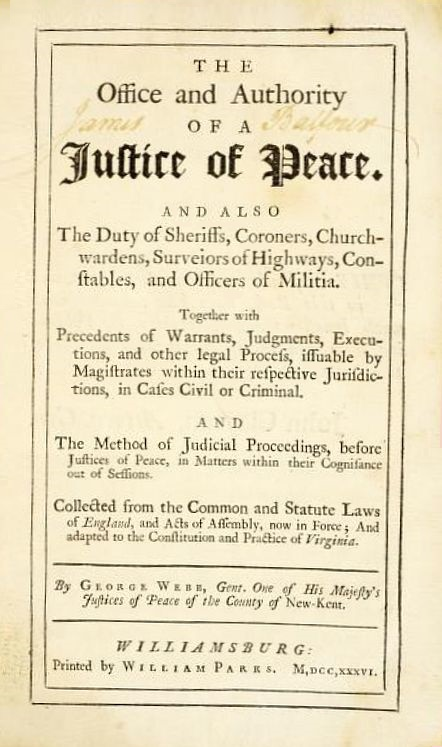
George Webb's 1736
office of "Justice of Peace"

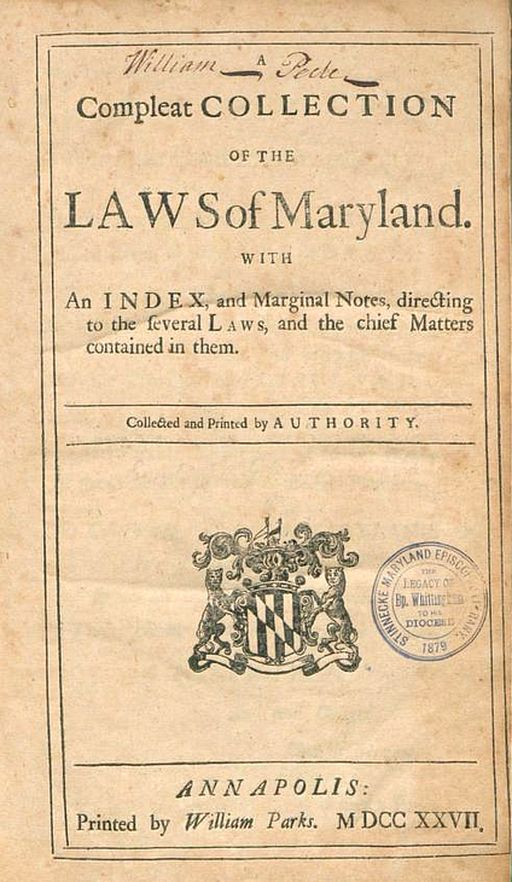
Complete collection of the 1727 Laws of Maryland

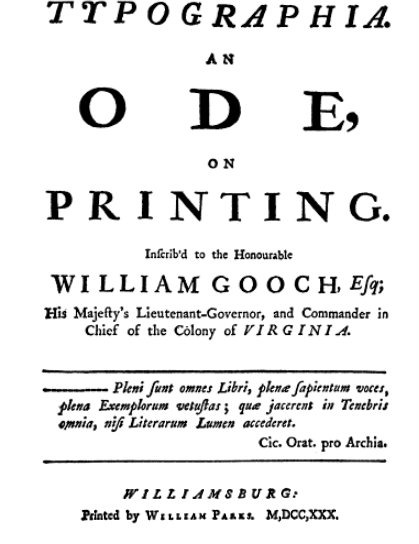
1730 Typographia
An Ode on Printing

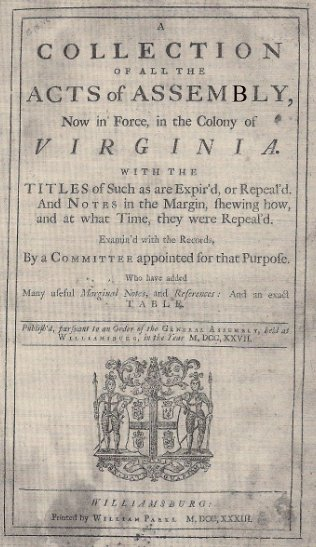
1733 Acts of Assembly for the Colony of Virginia

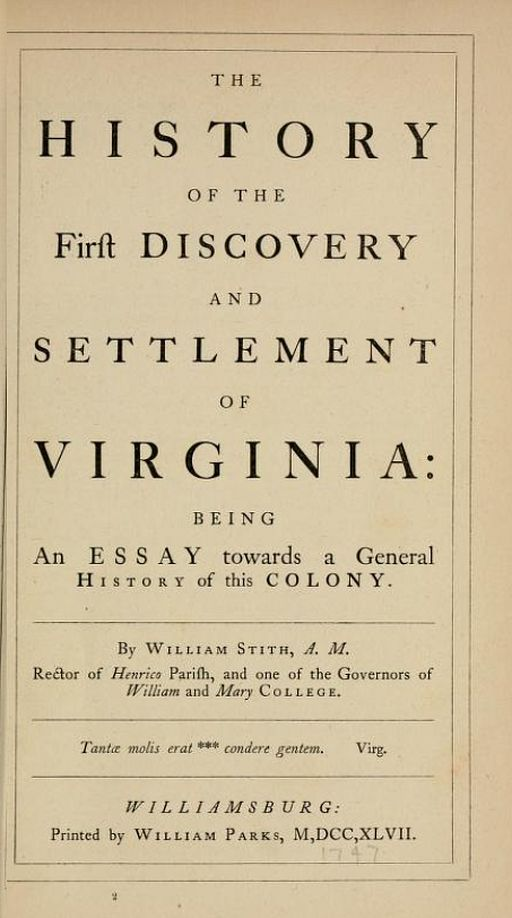
1747 History of Discovery and Settlement of Virginia

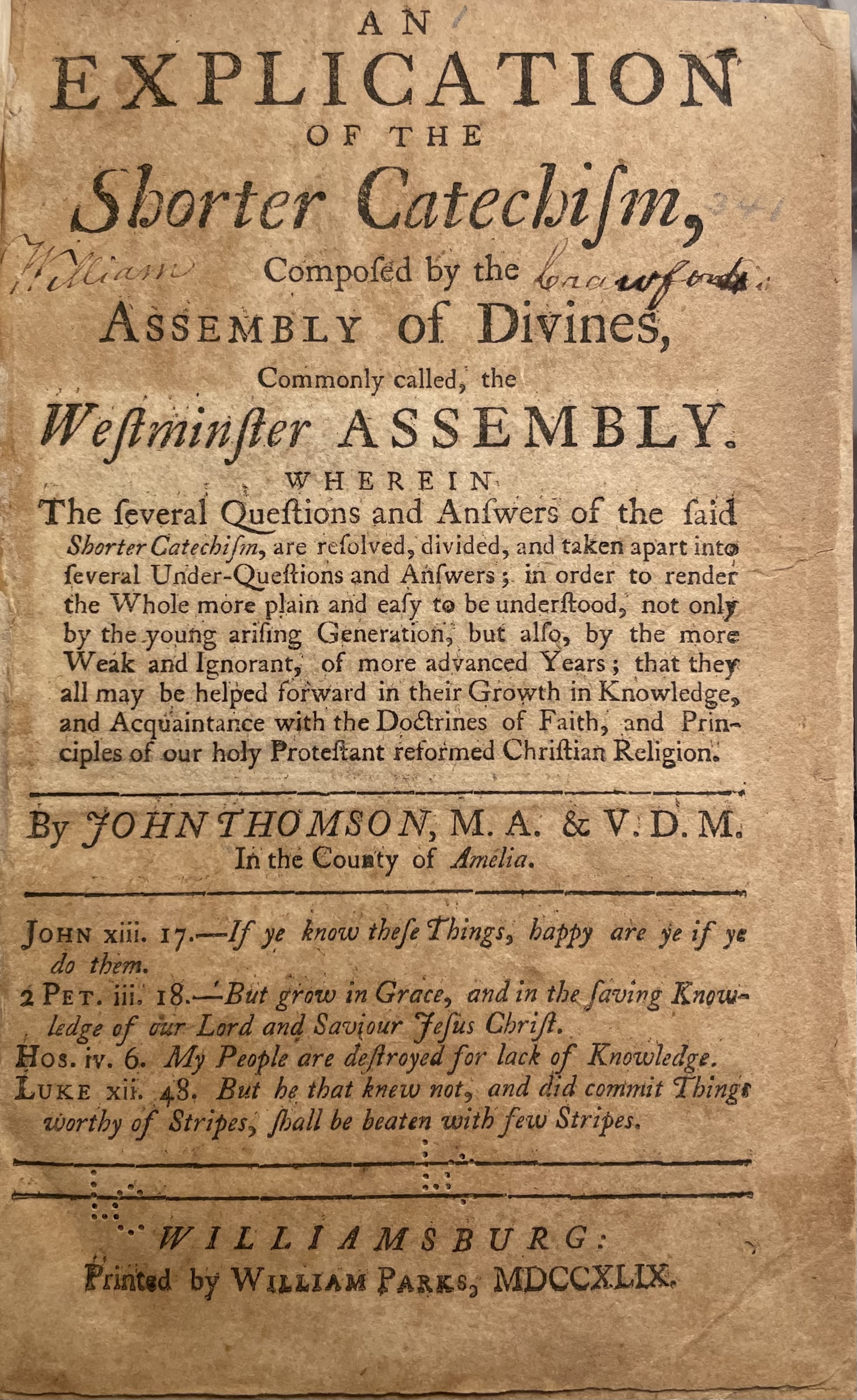
1749 John Thomson's Explication of the Shorter Catechism

== See also ==
- Jane Aitken
- Elizabeth Timothy
- John Holt (publisher)
- David Hall (publisher)
- Early American publishers and printers
- List of early American publishers and printers

== Bibliography ==
- Bidwell, John (2013). American Paper Mills, 1690–1832: A Directory of the Paper Trade with Notes on Products, Watermarks, Distribution Methods, and Manufacturing Techniques. UPNE. ISBN 978-1-58465-964-8.
- Bryson, William Hamilton (2000). Virginia Law Books: Essays and Bibliographies, Volume 239 (Google eBook). American Philosophical Society. ISBN 0-87169-239-2.
- Carlson, Patricia Ann (October 1978). "William Parks, Colonial Printer, to Dr. Charles Carroll". The Virginia Magazine of History and Biography. 88 (4). Virginia Historical Society: 408–412. JSTOR 4248253.
- Copeland, David A. (2000). Debating the issues in colonial newspapers : primary documents on events of the period. Westport, Conn. : Greenwood Press. ISBN 978-0-313-30982-3.
- Dargan, Marion (1910). "Crime and the Virginia Gazette 1736–1775". Bulletin: Sociological Series. 1–2 (6). University of New Mexico Press: 4.
- Evans, Charles (1903). American Bibliography: 1730–1750. Blakely Press. OCLC 317114866.
- Flora, Joseph M. (2002). Companion to Southern Literature. LSU Press. ISBN 9780807126929.
- Ford, Thomas K. (1958). Printer in Eighteenth Century Williamsburg: An Account of His Life and Times and of His Craft. Colonial Williamsburg, Virginia: Colonial Williamsburg Foundation. ISBN 978-0-910412-20-9. Google book
- Gooch, William h (1926). William Parks. William Parks Club.
- Kent, Allen (1978). Encyclopedia of Library and Information Science, Volume 24. CRC Press. ISBN 0-8247-2024-5.
- Krope, Carl R. (1983). "Some New Light on William Parks". The Virginia Magazine of History and Biography. Vol. VII. pp. 92–97.
- Lemay, J. A. Leo (2006). The Life of Benjamin Franklin, Volume 2: Printer and Publisher, 1730–1747. University of Pennsylvania Press. ISBN 978-0-8122-3855-6.
- Mellen, Roger P. (2009). The Origins of a Free Press in Prerevolutionary Virginia: Creating a Culture of Political Dissent. Edwin Mellen Press. ISBN 978-0-7734-3877-4.
- McKerns, Joseph P. (1989). Biographical Dictionary of American Journalism. Greenwood Press. ISBN 978-0-313-23819-2.
- Moore, John Weeks (1886). Moore's Historical, Biographical, and Miscellaneous Gatherings, in the form of disconnected notes relative to printers, printing, publishing, and editing of books, newspapers, magazines. Concord, N.H., Printed by the Republican press association.
- Parks, William (April 1922). Wroth, Lawrence C. (ed.). "Will of William Parks, The First Printer in Virginia". The William and Mary Quarterly. 2 (2). Omohundro Institute of Early American History and Culture: 92–96. doi:10.2307/1921438. JSTOR 1921438.
- Parks, A. Franklin (2012). William Parks: Colonial Printer. Penn State Press. ISBN 978-0-271-05212-0.
- Thomas, Isaiah (1874). History of Printing in America. Vol. I. New York, Burt Franklin.
- Tyler, Lyon Gardiner (1907). Williamsburg, the old colonial capital. Richmond, Va. : Whittet & Shepperson.
- Weeks, Lyman Horace (1916). A history of paper-manufacturing in the United States, 1690–1916. New York, The Lockwood trade journal company.
- Wroth, Lawrence C. (1922). A History of Printing in Colonial Maryland, 1686–1776. Baltimore : Typothetae of Baltimore.
- Wroth, Lawrence C. (1926a). The Colonial Printer. Courier Dover Publications. ISBN 0-486-28294-5.
- Wroth, Lawrence C. (1926b). William Parks, printer and journalist of England and colonial Williamsburg. William Parks club. Publications, ed. By e. G. Swem; no. 3. The William Parks Club; Appeals Press, Inc. Richmond.
- "Printer and Binder". Colonial Williamsburg Foundation. 2013.
- "A History of The Virginia Gazette". Daily Press. The Virginia Gazette. 2013.

=== Newspaper sources ===
- "Advertisements". The American Weekly Mercury. Philadelphia, Pennsylvania. April 4, 1728. p. 4. "The said Post-Office will be kept at the house of Andrew Bradford in Philadelphia, and William Parks in Annapolis; and Notice shall be hereafter given of all other Places on the Road, that shall be fix'd on for the Reception and Delivery of Letters."
- "Colonial Printing Press will open in Williamsburg Tuesday". Daily Press. Newport News, Virginia. July 23, 1950. p. 43 – via Newspapers.com.
- "Williamsburg had its own freedom of press battle". Daily Press. Newport News, Virginia. February 27, 1983. p. C# – via Newspapers.com.
- "Biography of William Parks, Early Printer". Daily Press. Newport News, Virginia. July 19, 1957. p. 37 – via Newspapers.com.
- "Virginia's first Public Printer began Williamsburg Gazette in 1730". Daily Press. Newport News, Virginia. September 16, 1984. p. 121 – via Newspapers.com.
