= Two Penny Act =

1758 law enacted in the Colony of Virginia

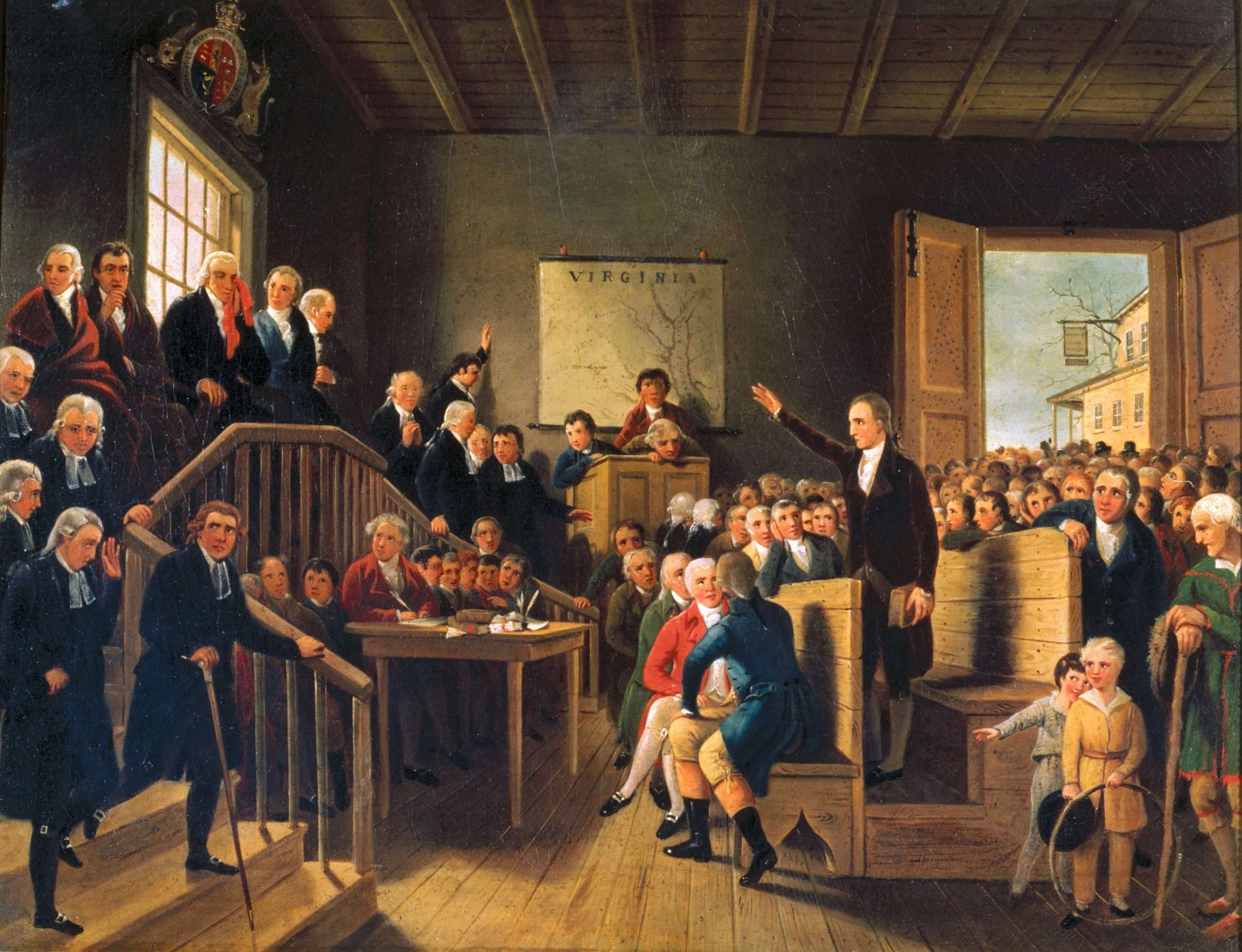
George Cooke's 1834 depiction of Patrick Henry arguing the Parson's Cause case at the Hanover County Courthouse

The Two Penny Act was a law enacted in 1758 by the House of Burgesses which impacted the compensation of Anglican ministers in the British colony of Virginia. The controversy surrounding it led to the Parson's Cause trial, which is regarded as an important event in the history of the American Revolution.

The act was issued after three years of drought which produced a low-yielding tobacco crop. The one-year measure allowed Anglican ministers' salaries to be paid at a fixed rate of two pence per pound of tobacco, as tobacco was often used as currency. The market rate at the time was set at four to six pence per pound of tobacco. Once the loss of value was factored in, a clergyman was receiving about one-third of his normal, stipulated salary. The colony's councilors had approved and, with the House of Burgesses, convinced Governor Francis Fauquier to allow the act to go into effect.

In doing so, Fauquier deviated from his royally mandated instructions. He defended his royal malfeasance by arguing that, in reality, he had no choice. "As the Bill," he wrote, "was a temporary Law to ease the people from a Burthen [sic] which the Country thought too great for them to bear... The country were intent upon it, and both the Council and the House of Burgesses were almost unanimous in their pressing it. And I conceived it would be a very wrong Step for me to take who was an entire Stranger to the Distresses of the Country, to set my Face against the whole colony by refusing the Bill which I had a Precedent for Passing. Whatever may be the Case now, I am persuaded that if I had refused it, I must have despaired ever gaining any Influence either in the Council or House of Burgesses."

In May 1759, petitions were presented to the Board of Trade on behalf of Virginian clergymen, asking for its repeal. Lord Halifax recommended that the act be disallowed and instructed that Fauquier "for the future strictly observe and obey" his instructions. It was disallowed by the end of August 1759 by the Board of Trade.

== Anglican objection ==
The Anglican clergy generally objected to the act, arguing that they should benefit from the high tobacco prices on account of their agreement to accept whatever their tobacco would sell for when the price was low. But the Privy Council back in England would have allowed the act to continue, had it not been for the persistent objections of the Reverend John Camm of York County. A slew of pamphlets and lawsuits had availed nothing for Camm and his counterparts, so he sailed for England to present his arguments.

In England, Camm contracted the help of the Archbishop of Canterbury and the Bishop of London. He argued that the Two Penny Act was a result of the fading of royal and Anglican authority in Virginia and the American colonies. However, the focus on his own list of grievances ignored the act's purpose as a financial relief measure. The King and his council dismissed the measure and its predecessors on the recommendation of the Board of Trade.

The Two Penny Act had expired, and repealing the law would have been open for discussion had not several clergymen sued for back pay. Two cases were rejected because the act was valid until it was disallowed by the Privy Council. One court awarded a minister double his salary in damages, but it was the case filed by Reverend James Maury of Louisa County that turned out to be the most well known. This was the case most commonly referred to as the Parson's Cause.

== Possible conspiracy ==
Some historians have questioned the actual need for the Two Penny Act. There were some in Virginia who were happy to see the ministers take a financial blow, though there is very little evidence that the House of Burgesses deliberately set out to punish the clergy.

== See also ==
- American Revolution
- History of Virginia
- Parson's Cause
