= The Virginia Gazette =

Newspaper in Williamsburg, Virginia

- The December 13, 2025, front page of The Virginia Gazette
- Type: Twice weekly newspaper
- Format: Small format broadsheet
- Owner: Daily Press (Tribune Publishing)
- Publisher: Par Ridder (Interim General Manager)
- Editor: Kim Root
- Founded: 1930; 96 years ago
- Headquarters: Williamsburg, Virginia, U.S.
- Circulation: 7,739 (as of 2021)
- Website: vagazette.com

The Virginia Gazette is the local newspaper of Williamsburg, Virginia. Established in 1930, it is named for the historical Virginia Gazette published between 1736 and 1780. It is published twice a week in the broadsheet format.

== Historical papers ==
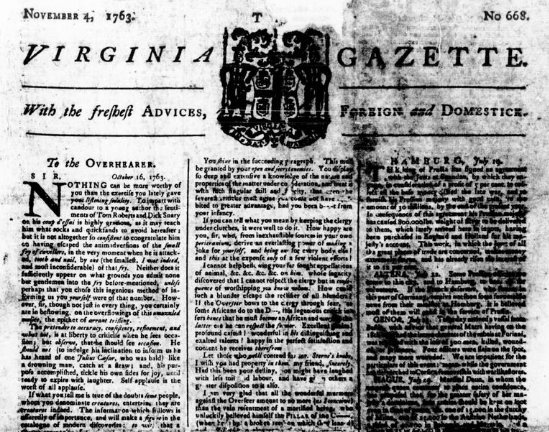
Virginia Gazette, November 4, 1763

There were actually three papers published in Williamsburg under the name The Virginia Gazette between 1736 and 1780. Together, these papers serve as an important record for Virginia's colonial history. The original Virginia Gazette, the first newspaper ever published in Virginia, was established by William Parks, who printed the first four-page edition on August 6, 1736. Its motto was "Containing the freshest Advices, Foreign and Domestick." Three years earlier, Parks had founded The Maryland Gazette in Annapolis, Maryland. In 1743, Parks built a paper mill in Williamsburg; he purchased the raw material to create newsprint from Benjamin Franklin. The paper was published, successively, by William Parks (1736–1750), William Hunter (1751–1761), Joseph Royle (1761–1765), Alexander Purdie and John Dixon (1766-1775), Dixon and Hunter (1775-1778), and Dixon and Thomas Nicolson (1779–1780). The last issue was published on April 8, 1780, after which point the paper relocated to Richmond, Virginia's new capital.

In 1766 William Rind founded a competing newspaper also called The Virginia Gazette. This paper was published by Rind (1766–1773), then by his widow Clementina Rind (1773–1774), and finally John Pinkney (1774–1776). Its last issue was printed on February 3, 1776. On February 3, 1775, Alexander Purdie, previously a publisher of the original Gazette, started a third paper of the same name. It was published by Purdie until his death in 1779; it was then published by John Clarkson and Augustine Davis until December 9, 1780. Afterward, various papers were published periodically around Virginia using the Virginia Gazette banner.

== Modern paper ==
In 1893 W. C. Johnston brought the name Virginia Gazette back to Williamsburg in newspaper form, but unrelated to its colonial predecessors. An Ohio native and an alumnus of the College of William and Mary, Johnston served as clerk of the Williamsburg city council, member of the board of registrars and the Williamsburg Business Association, and postmaster. As editor of the Virginia Gazette, a Democratic weekly, Johnston campaigned vigorously to attract industry to the region. The Gazette, for example, described a new mill that opened in 1895 as "the morning star of the future that heralds a glorious dawn of prosperity upon this little city." Typical content included local and national news, general interest stories, advertisements, business directories, college notes, and social happenings.

L. S. Cottrell, Johnston's original printer, became owner and publisher in 1894 but sold the paper back to Johnston in March 1896. Circulation by 1900 was approximately 500, and there was no competing paper published in town during the paper's life.

Robert P. Scott became owner and publisher of the Gazette in 1917, with Johnston still serving as editor. Local news still predominated, but national issues were becoming increasingly important. In 1920, Johnston editorialized against women's suffrage as a violation of states' rights: "No one questions the ability of women. . . . No one questions that they are as capable as men to cast their ballots. But thousands question the manner in which women are to be enfranchised and honestly believe that the surrender to the general government of the powers of the state is too big a price to pay for a privilege which is chimerical and visionary in the extreme."

By 1922, the paper ceased publication. Another Virginia Gazette appeared in 1925, associated with the William Parks School of Journalism at the College of William and Mary, but it lasted only through 1927. Havilock Babcock, of the journalism faculty was editor and students served as reporters and handled all the other newspaper jobs, except printing.

In 1930, W. A. R. Goodwin, pastor of the local Bruton Parish Church and a co-founder of Colonial Williamsburg, made a push for a paper to return to Williamsburg under the banner of The Virginia Gazette. At Goodwin's urging publisher J. A. Osborne moved to town from Florida and established the modern paper. In 1961 the Osborne family sold the paper to John O. W. Gravely III. Gravely died in 1975 and his widow Martha became president and publisher. The Gravely family sold the paper in 1986 to the Chesapeake Publishing Corp. of Easton, MD., a subsidiary of Whitney Communications. Later in 2001 Chesapeake sold the paper to the Daily Press, a Tribune Co. daily in Newport News, Virginia.

Through the years, the paper won Virginia Press Association's award for community excellent in publishing three times, in 1969, 1980 and 1994. Long a weekly newspaper, the Gazette expanded to twice-weekly in 1984. The current publisher is W. C. "Bill" O'Donovan who has served in that capacity since 1986. beginning as an editor under Gravely.

== See also ==
- Early American publishers and printers
- William Hunter (publisher)
- William Parks (publisher)
- Joseph Royle (publisher)
