= John Camm (Anglican priest) =

Anglican Priest

The Reverend John Camm

7th President of the College of William & Mary
- In office 1771–1776
- Preceded by: James Horrocks
- Succeeded by: James Madison

Personal details
- Born: 1718 Hornsea, Yorkshire
- Died: 1778 (aged 59–60)
- Education: Trinity College, Cambridge

John Camm (1718–1778) was an Anglican priest who served as the seventh president of the College of William and Mary—the last before the American Revolution. He was a fierce Tory advocate of the prerogative of the Crown and the established Church.

== Early life and education ==
Camm was born in 1718, in Hornsea, Yorkshire, England to Thomas Camm and an unknown mother. He was educated in the school at nearby Beverley, and was admitted to Trinity College, Cambridge at the age of 20. Elected to a scholarship, he completed a Bachelor of Arts in April 1742, and then a Master of Arts and a Doctor of Divinity. Subsequently, he emigrated to British America, settling in the Colony of Virginia where in 1745, he was made minister of Newport Parish, Isle of Wight County.

== Career ==
=== Young Professor ===
From 1749 to 1771, he served on the faculty of the College of William and Mary as professor of divinity and was the minister of York-Hampton Parish, York County.

=== The Parson's Cause ===
As a leader of the Church-and-College party in Virginia, Camm defied the authority of his local vestry, the Board of Visitors of the College of William & Mary, and the colonial legislature in the Two-Penny Acts controversies and the American episcopate debates. He wrote three lengthy pamphlets, a number of addresses to the King, several dozen essays to the gazettes, and some scattered poetry. Camm's peers elected him to positions of responsibility throughout his career in Virginia. Governor Francis Fauquier, who disliked Camm and alluded in a letter to the Bishop of London to Camm's delight "to raise a Flame and live in it," admitted that Camm had ability. He was a leader in organizing clerical opposition to the Virginia legislature's Two-Penny Acts of 1755 and 1758: most of the significant arguments about Crown prerogatives and colonial autonomy expressed during the Stamp Act crisis and the Revolutionary War were formed during these earlier Two-Penny Acts controversies. Camm was elected to carry the clergy's case to the Privy Council in England in 1758, where he successfully petitioned the King to disallow the Virginia acts.

On returning to Virginia, Camm was drawn into a pamphlet war with two members of the Virginia legislature, Landon Carter and Richard Bland. He defied the Board of Visitors of the college in their attempts to curb the authority of the president and faculty, was dismissed from his faculty position in 1757, appealed to England, and was reinstated in 1763.Arthur Lee held that Camm was at "the centre of all the disaffection in the Colony."

=== College President ===
During the summer and fall of 1771, Camm became president of the College of William & Mary, rector of Bruton Parish Church in Williamsburg, commissary of the Bishop of London in Virginia, and a member of the Royal Council of Virginia. His small vocal group of Anglican clergy continued resistance to secular authority. A literary battle to which Camm lent his pen was waged in the Virginia Gazette in 1771–1774, and this dispute on the episcopate was lost, from the point of view of the established church in America.

Camm's outspoken Tory views did not require him to preach with pistols on his pulpit, as did his friend Jonathan Boucher. He died quietly in late 1778.

== Personal life ==
For most of the 18th century, faculty at William & Mary were required to be unmarried, and Camm observed this rule, remaining a bachelor into his 50s. The story of his marriage to Betsy Hansford, a relation of the Hansford family associated with Bacon's Rebellion, became something of a legend in Tidewater Virginia.

According to a version published by John Fiske's Old Virginia and Her Neighbors, the young Betsy Hansford, who Camm had baptized as an infant, was being courted by a suiter without success. The young man asked Camm for help, and the old parson obliged by meeting with Hansford and highlighting passages in the Bible that framed marriage as holy obligation. Unmoved, Hansford told Camm that if he wished to understand her resistance, he should return home and study 2 Samuel 12. There, Camm found the passage that made everything clear: "Though art the man." The couple married on July 8, 1769 and subsequently had five children.

== Legacy ==
During his career Camm wrote three lengthy pamphlets, a number of addresses to the King, several dozen essays to the gazettes, and some scattered poetry. He was an indefatigable letter writer, and his correspondence reflects the major debates of more than thirty years in Virginia. His contribution to American Revolutionary debates was to state cogently the minority viewpoint of Virginia Loyalists.

Camm Hall at the college's campus adjacent to Colonial Williamsburg is named in his honor. The gold Botetourt Medal that Camm awarded to his nephew, John Camm White, in 1775 survives in the collection of the Virginia Historical Society.

== Bibliography ==
- "Sketch of John Camm". The William and Mary College Quarterly Historical Magazine. 19 (1). Omohundro Institute of Early American History and Culture: 28–30. July 1910. doi:10.2307/1921416. JSTOR 1921416.
- Scott, Arthur P. (December 1916). "The Constitutional Aspects of the "Parson's Cause"". Political Science Quarterly. 31 (4). Oxford University Press: 558–577. doi:10.2307/2141628. hdl:2027/loc.ark:/13960/t4fn1g052. JSTOR 2141628.
- Ericson, John. "Rev. John Camm and the Two Penny Acts". StLukesMuseum.org. St. Luke’s Historic Church & Museum.
