= List of Russian historians =

This list of Russian historians includes historians, as well as archaeologists, paleographers, genealogists and other representatives of auxiliary historical disciplines from the Russian Federation, the Soviet Union, the Russian Empire and other predecessor states of Russia.

== Alphabetical list ==
=== A ===
- Valery Alekseyev (1929–1991), anthropologist, proposed Homo rudolfensis
- Mikhail Artamonov (1898–1972), historian and archaeologist, founder of modern Khazar studies, excavated a great number of Scythian and Khazar kurgans and settlements, including the fortress of Sarkel
- Artemiy Artsikhovsky (1902–1978), archaeologist, discoverer of birch bark documents in Novgorod

=== B ===
- Vasily Bartold (1869–1930), turkologist, the "Gibbon of Turkestan", an archaeologist of Samarcand
- Konstantin Bestuzhev-Ryumin (1829–1897), 19th-century historian and paleographer, founder of the Bestuzhev Courses for women
- Nikita Bichurin (1777–1853), a founder of Sinology, published many documents on Chinese and Mongolian history, opened the first Chinese-language school in Russia
- Nikolai N. Bolkhovitinov (1930-2008), Russian/Soviet historian
- Boris Hessen (1893–1936), physicist who brought externalism into modern historiography of science

=== D ===
- Dmitry Ilovaysky (1832–1920), 19th-century anti-Normanist
- Igor Diakonov (1915–1999), historian and linguist, researcher of Sumer and Assyria
- Dimitri Obolensky (1918–2001), historian and Byzantinist

=== F ===
- Boris Farmakovsky (1870–1928), archaeologist of Ancient Greek colony Olbia
- Friedrich von Adelung (1768–1843), historian and museologist, researched the European accounts of the Time of Troubles

=== G ===
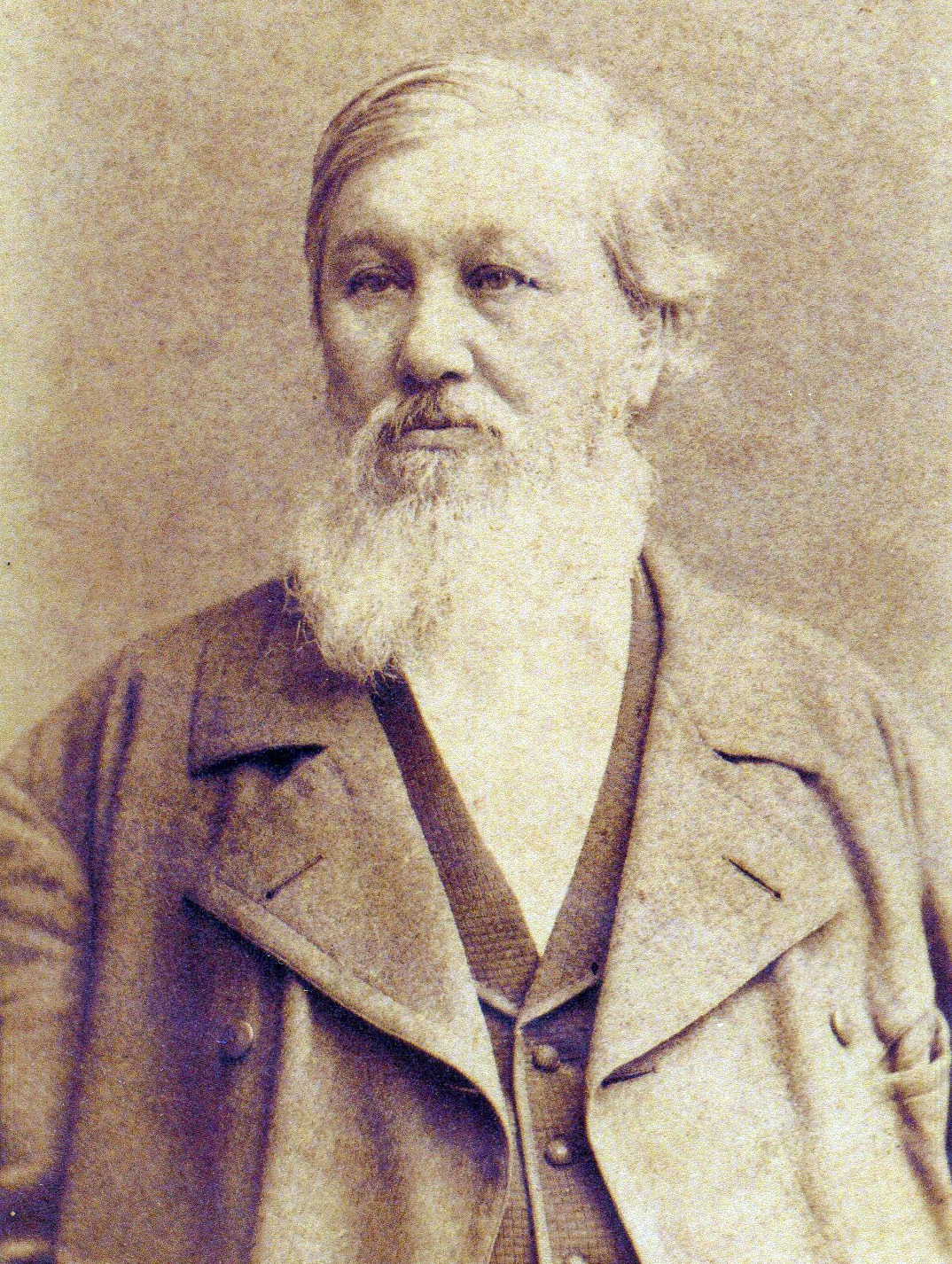
Danilevsky

- Vladimir Golenishchev (1856–1947), egyptologist, excavated Wadi Hammamat, discovered over 6,000 antiquities, including the Moscow Mathematical Papyrus, the Story of Wenamun, and various Fayum portraits
- Timofey Granovsky (1813–1855), a founder of mediaeval studies in Russia, disproved the historicity of Vineta
- Boris Grekov (1882–1953), researcher of Kievan Rus' and Golden Horde
- Alexander V. Gordon (born 1937), researcher of the French Revolution, Third world and Peasantry
- Vladimir Guerrier (1837–1919), historian of the French Revolution, founder of the Courses Guerrier for women
- Lev Gumilev (1912–1992), historian and ethnologist, researcher of ancient Central Asian peoples, related ethnogenesis and biosphere, influenced the rise of Neo-Eurasianism

=== I ===
- Igor Diakonov (1915–1999), historian and linguist, researcher of Sumer and Assyria
- Igor Kurukin (born 1953), specialist in the history of Russia of the 16th–18th centuries

=== K ===
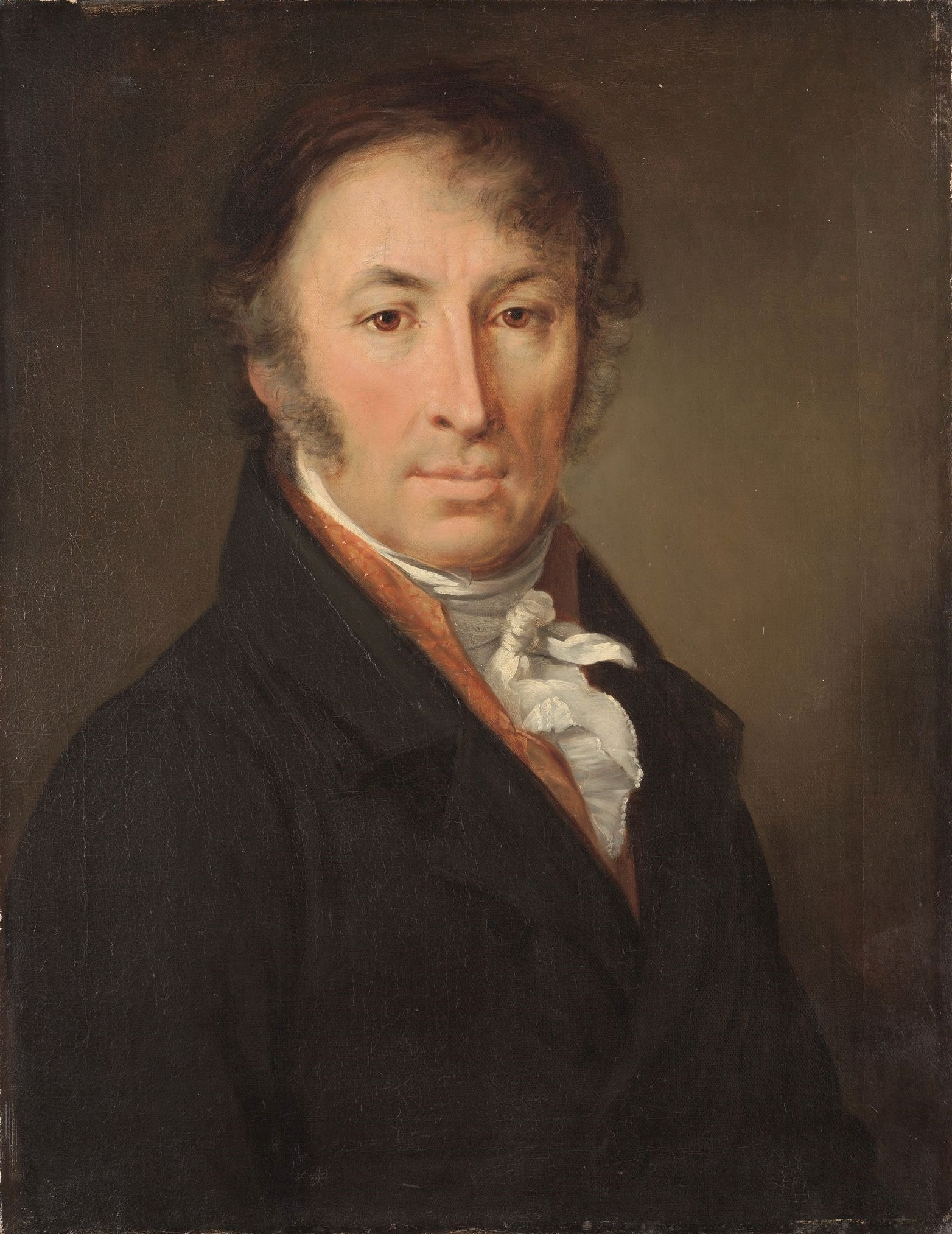
Karamzin

- Alexander Kamensky (born 1954), a historian specializing in the history of 18th-century Russia.
- Konstantin Kapkov (born 1969), a historian of the reign of Nicholas II and the history of the Russian Orthodox church.
- Pyotr Kafarov (1817–1878), sinologist, discovered many invaluable manuscripts, including The Secret History of the Mongols
- Nikolai Karamzin (1766–1826), sentimentalist writer, historian and manuscript collector, author of the 12-volume History of the Russian State
- Vasily Klyuchevsky (1841–1911), played influential role in Russian historiography around 1900, shifted focus from politics and society to geography and economy
- Alexander Kazhdan (1922–1997), Byzantinist, editor of the Oxford Dictionary of Byzantium
- Nikodim Kondakov (1844–1925), researcher of Byzantine art
- Andrey Korotayev (born 1961), historian and anthropologist, a founder of cliodynamics, developer of social cycle theory
- Stanislaw Kuczera, (1928–2020), sinologist and archaeologist
- Sergey Kovalev (1886–1960), scholar of classical antiquity
- Nikolay Kun (1877–1940), historian, writer and educator
- Yelena Yefimovna Kuzmina (1931–2013), researcher of prehistory of Indo-Aryan peoples

=== L ===
- Platon Levshin (1737–1812), president of the Most Holy Synod during the Age of Enlightenment, author of the first systematic course of the history of Russian Orthodox Church
- Nikolay Likhachyov (1862–1936), first and foremost Russian sigillographer, also in a number of other auxiliary historical disciplines
- Aleksey Lobanov-Rostovsky (1824–1896), statesman, published the major Russian Genealogical Book
- Mikhail Lomonosov (1711–1765), polymath scientist and artist, the first opponent of the Normanist theory, published an early account of Russian history
- Matvei Lyubavsky (1860–1936) historian of ancient Russian history

=== M ===
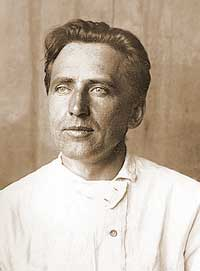
Artamonov

- Mikhail Artamonov (1898–1972), historian and archaeologist, founder of modern Khazar studies, excavated a great number of Scythian and Khazar kurgans and settlements, including the fortress of Sarkel
- Mykola Kostomarov (1817–1885), Russian–Ukrainian historian, folklorist and romantic writer, researched the differences between Great Russia and Little Russia and the history of Ukraine
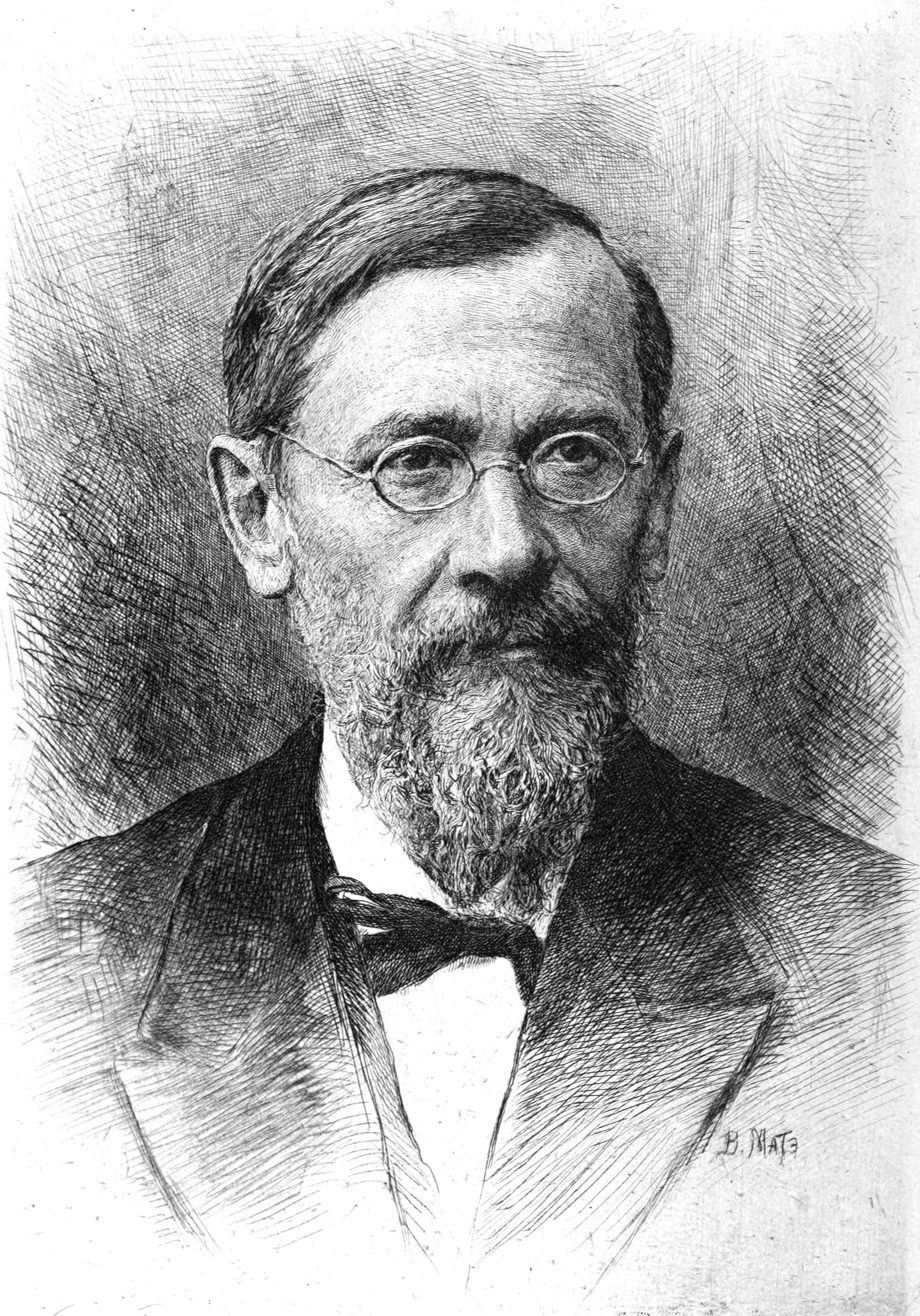
  Klyuchevsky
- Pyotr Kozlov (1863–1935), explorer of Central Asia, discoverer of the ancient Tangut city of Khara-Khoto and Xiongnu royal burials at Noin-Ula

=== N ===
- Nikolay Danilevsky (1822–1885), ethnologist, philosopher and historian, a founder of Eurasianism, the first to present an account of history as a series of distinct civilisations

=== M ===
- Madhavan K. Palat (born 1947), since 1989 Professor of Russian and European History, Jawaharlal Nehru University, Delhi, India. Visiting Professor of Imperial Russian History at the University of Chicago (2006).
- Boris Marshak (1933–2006), excavated the Sogdian ruins at Panjakent
- Friedrich Martens (1845–1909), legal historian, drafted the Martens Clause of the Hague Peace Conference
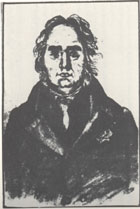
  Müller
- Vladimir Minorsky (1877–1966), historian of Persia
- Yagutil Mishiev (1927–2024), writer, author of books about the history of Derbent, Dagestan, Russia.
- Anatoly Moskvin (born 1966), linguist and historian, arrested in 2011 after the bodies of 26 mummified young women were discovered in his home.
- Gerhardt Friedrich Müller (1705–1783), co-founder of the Russian Academy of Sciences, explorer and the first academic historian of Siberia and Russia, pioneer of ethnography, put forth the Normanist theory
- Aleksei Musin-Pushkin (1744–1817), collector of Kievan Rus' manuscripts, discovered The Tale of Igor's Campaign

=== O ===
- Dimitri Obolensky (1918–2001), Byzantine commonwealth researcher
- Alexey Okladnikov (1908–1981), historian and archaeologist of Siberia and Mongolia
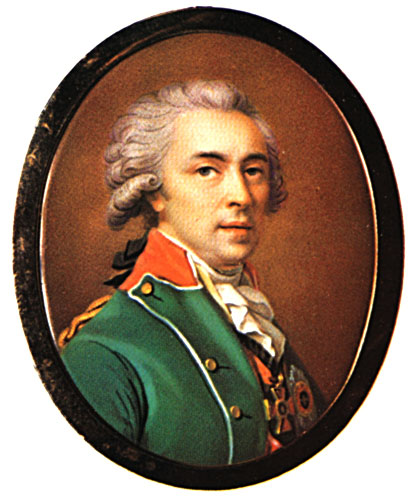
  Musin-Pushkin
- Sergey Oldenburg (1863–1934), a founder of Russian Indology and the Academic Institute of Oriental Studies
- George Ostrogorsky (1902–1976), 20th-century Byzantinist

=== P ===
- Avraamy Palitsyn (died 1626), 17th-century historian of the Time of Troubles
- Anna Pankratova (1897–1957), leading Soviet historian, educator and writer
- Evgeny Pashukanis (1891–1937), legal historian, wrote The General Theory of Law and Marxism
- Boris Piotrovsky (1908–1990), researcher of Urartu, Scythia, and Nubia, long-term director of the Hermitage Museum
- Mikhail Piotrovsky (born 1944), orientalist, current director of the Hermitage Museum
- Mikhail Pogodin (1800–1875), mid-19th-century Russian historian and textologist, proponent of the Normanist theory
- Boris Polevoy (1918–2002), major historian of the Russian Far East
- Mikhail Pokrovsky (1868-1932), Marxist historian, most prominent Soviet historian of the 1920s
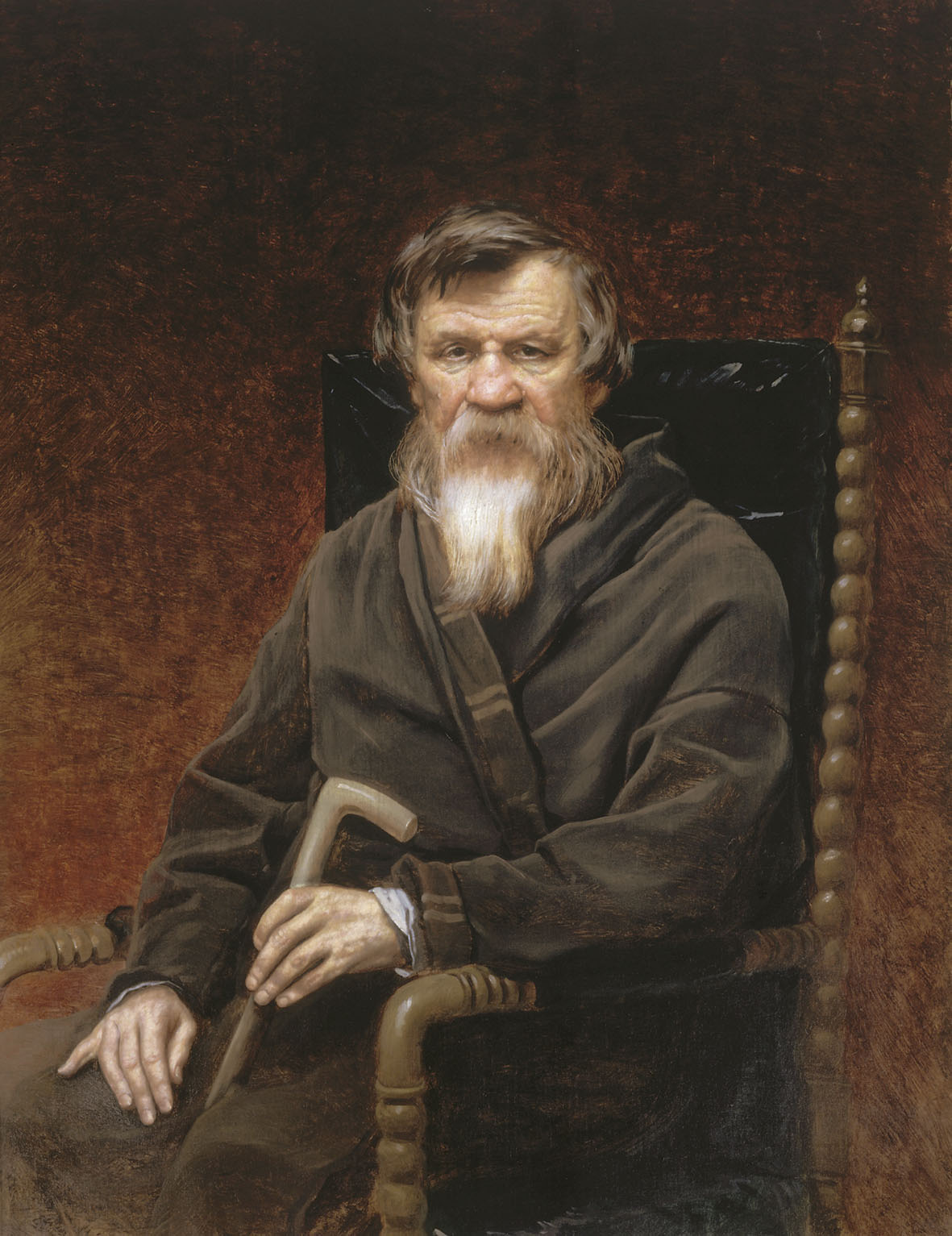
  Pogodin
- Natalia Polosmak (born 1956), archaeologist of Pazyryk burials, discoverer of Ice Maiden mummy
- Alexander Polovtsov (1832–1909), statesman, historian and Maecenas, founder of the Russian Historian Society
- Tatyana Proskuryakova (1909–1985), Mayanist scholar and archaeologist, deciphered the ancient Maya script

=== R ===
- Semyon Remezov (ca. 1642- after 1720), cartographer and the first historian of Siberia, author of the Remezov Chronicle
- Mikhail Rostovtsev (1870–1952), archeologist and economist, the first to thoroughly examine the social and economic systems of the Ancient World, excavated Dura-Europos
- Nicholas Roerich (1874–1947), painter, archeologist, and public figure, explorer of Central Asia, initiator of the international Roerich’s Pact on protection of historical monuments
- Sergei Rudenko (1885–1969), discoverer of Scythian Pazyryk burials
- Boris Rybakov (1908–2001), historian and chief Soviet archaeologist for 40 years, primary opponent of the Normanist theory
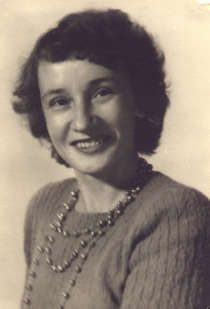
  Proskuryakova

=== S ===
- Dmitry Samokvasov (1843–1911), discoverer of Black Grave in Chernigov
- Viktor Sarianidi (1929–2013), discoverer of the Bactria-Margiana Archaeological Complex and the Bactrian Gold in Central Asia
- Aleksey Shakhmatov (1864–1920), historian and philologist, pioneer in textology, particularly textual criticism of the Primary Chronicle
- Mikhail Shcherbatov (1733–1790), a man of the Russian Enlightenment, conservative historian
- Anatoly Pavlovich Shikman (born 1948), author of Figures of Russian History and other works.
- Sergey Solovyov (1820–1879), author of the 29-volume History of Russia
- Vasily Struve (1889–1965), orientalist and historian of the Ancient World, put forth the Marxist theory of five socio-economic formations that dominated Soviet education

=== T ===
- Yevgeny Tarle (1874–1955), author of studies on Napoleon's invasion of Russia and on the Crimean War
- Vasily Tatishchev (1686–1750), statesman, geographer and historian, discovered and published Russkaya Pravda, Sudebnik of 1550 and the controversial Ioachim Chronicle; wrote the Istoriya Rossiisskaya; has been denounced for fabrications, carelessness and untraceable claims, known as Tatishchev information.
- Mikhail Tikhomirov (1893–1965), specialist in medieval Russian paleography, contributed to the Complete Collection of Russian Chronicles (PSRL)
- Vladimir Yakovlevich Tolmachev (ru, 1876–1942), Imperial Russian and Soviet archaeologist in Manchuria
- Kamilla Trever (1892–1974), specialist in the history and culture of Transcaucasia and Central Asia
- Boris Turayev (1868–1920), author of the first full-scale History of Ancient East
- Peter Turchin (born 1957), population biologist and historian, coined the term cliodynamics
- Alexander Tyumenev (1880–1959), historian of antiquity, author of one of the first Marxist works on the history of classical societies in the Soviet Union

=== U ===
- Fyodor Uspensky (1845–1928), Byzantinist, researcher of the Trapezuntine Empire
- Aleksey Uvarov (1825–1884), founder of the first Russian archaeological society, discovered over 750 ancient kurgans

=== V ===
- Vasily Vasilievsky (1838–1899), 19th century Byzantinist
- Alexander Vasiliev (1867–1953), author of a comprehensive History of the Byzantine Empire
- Nikolay Veselovsky (1848–1918), first to excavate Afrasiab (the oldest part of Samarkand), as well as the Solokha and Maikop kurgans in Southern Russia
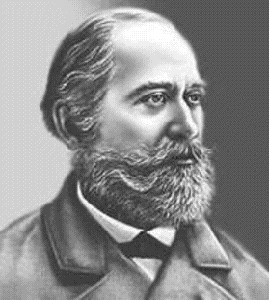
  Solovyov
- Viacheslav Petrovich Volgin (1879–1962), historian of early communist systems

=== Y ===
- Nikolai Yadrintsev (1842–1894), discoverer of Genghis Khan's capital Karakorum and the Orkhon script of ancient Türks
- Valentin Yanin (1929–2020), primary researcher of ancient birch bark documents

=== Z ===
- Gennady Zdanovich (born 1938), discoverer of Sintashta culture settlement Arkaim
- Viktor Zemskov (1946–2015), researcher of political repression in the Soviet Union between 1917 and 1954

== See also ==
- List of Russian scientists
- History of Russia
- Archaeology of Russia
- Science and technology in Russia
