= Fedor Karzhavin =

Russian traveller and writer (1745–1812)

- Федор Каржавин
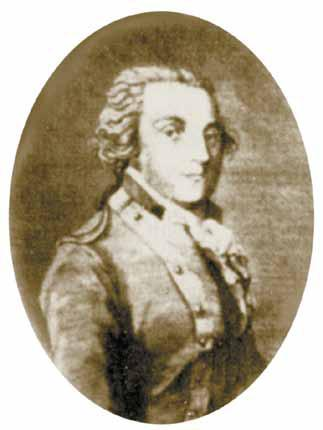
- Karzhavin
- Born: 20 January 1745; Saint Petersburg, Russia
- Died: 28 March 1812 (aged 67); Saint Petersburg, Russia
- Occupations: Traveller; translator
- Spouse: Charlotte Rembour

Fedor or Fyodor Vasilevich Karzhavin (Russian: Фёдор Васильевич Каржавин; 20 January 1745 – 28 March 1812) was a Russian traveller, writer, and translator. After spending some time in Paris, he worked in Martinique as a trader with the American colonial economy. He subsequently settled in colonial Virginia, where he became acquainted with several people at the College of William & Mary, including the professor and librarian Carlo Bellini. Through his connection with Bellini, he may have acquired the original copy of the charter of the College of William & Mary, which has since disappeared. After returning to Russia, he worked on several language-related works and translations, using it as a platform to oppose Tsarist rule and the repression of the Indigenous peoples of the Americas, and served the Admiralty Board as a translator.

== Biography ==
=== Early life and education ===
Karzhavin was born on 20 January 1745 in Saint Petersburg to Anna Isaevna and Vasilii Nikitich Karzhavin, the latter of whom was a merchant and a practicing Old Believer. Spending thirteen years in Paris, he attended the boarding school Jean-François Vauvilliers ran, and in August 1760, the Paris Foreign Missions Society admitted him to the Collegium of Foreign Affairs.

An uncle who lived in Paris, Erofey Karzhavin, provided Karzhavin with access to scientific libraries, he would later build his own personal library, which subsequently become known as "one of the best in Russia". He later became fluent in French during his time in Paris. S. R. Dolgova speculated that his knowledge of foreign languages may have originated from visiting the Sorbonne's lectures. While living in Paris, he witnessed the French Enlightenment.

Karzhavin returned home to Russia in 1765 and stepped down from the Collegium of Foreign Affairs as collegiate actuary in 1766. He worked briefly in architecture, including creating dictionaries in architecture, translating De architectura, and working as an assistant at the Expedition of Kremlin Buildings. He also worked as a French teacher at the Trinity Theological Seminary and passed the prerequisite exam for teaching French at Imperial Moscow University. One of his friends at the time was Semyon Desnitsky.

Although his father wanted him to work in commerce, Karzhavin decided to study natural science and medicine in Western Europe. Returning to Paris by 1774, he was married to lower-class orphan Charlotte Rembour; they had no children and the marriage later became a long-distance relationship. Although attempts to visit France during the French Revolution were unsuccessful, he still wrote letters to his wife there, showing an interest in French politics.

=== Life in Virginia ===
Karzhavin once visited Martinique in September 1776 as a trader with the American colonial economy. Karzhavin sailed from that same island in April 1777 and reached Virginia for the first time by June. He advertised his capacity as a Russian translator to the Continental Congress president John Hancock, but received no response; with little use for the Russian language in the colonies, he struggled to find financially-sustainable work. He then travelled between North Carolina and Boston on foot before returning to Virginia in 1779. Evading raids by British troops, Karzhavin arrived in Williamsburg and sought work. He later returned to Martinique in 1780.

During his first visit in America, Karzhavin witnessed the American Revolution and wrote in support of the independence cause, though he condemned their enslavement of Black people or their treatment of Native Americans. Nikolai N. Bolkhovitinov found it "fully justified that, as a representative of the Russian 'third estate,' Karzhavin found himself allied to the American-French side". In a letter he wrote around 1785, Karzhavin claimed to have spent six months working for Virginia's government before traveling back to Russia to represent the Continental Congress's interests before Catherine the Great, the Empress of Russia; these claims are unsubstantiated and may originate from Carlo Bellini (a close friend of his) having suggested such positions as possibilities for Karzhavin. Karzhavin would return to Williamsburg in April 1785, leaving in April 1787.

Karzhavin probably met Bellini in 1779 – either through a mutual acquaintance or Bellini's role as Virginia's secretary for foreign correspondence – and Bellini may have helped Karzhavin put a notice of job search into the local paper. Their friendship would last even after his return to Russia, where a book he wrote was dedicated to Bellini. Additionally, his other close associates at the College of William and Mary included James Madison and George Wythe.

Bolkhovitinov said that he was "the only person of Russian origin who spent a number of years in America during the Revolution," while Dolgova called him "one of the first Russians to undertake a voyage to America on his own initiative".

==== Charter of the College of William & Mary ====
Based on research he published in a 1978 Botetourt Bibliographical Society publication and a 1980 article in The Virginia Magazine of History and Biography, Frank B. Evans suspected that Karzhavin had stolen the Charter of the College of William & Mary. His findings had based on the naming of one "Karjavina" in a 19th-century extract of the 28 March 1791 minutes from the college faculty's proceedings: (Note: The original minutes are themselves lost, as they were likely destroyed in an 1862 fire at the Wren Building.)

The Society being informed by M. Bellini that the original charter of this College which is lost, was some years past seen by him in the possession of a certain Karjavina, a native of Muscovy, who declared that it was his intention to deposit the same among the archives of St. Petersburg in Russia. Resolved etc.

Evans suggesting that Karzhavin's 1787 departure from Virginia was the more likely instance when Karzhavin may have left with the charter. While Karzhavin may have taken the charter with hopes of selling it, it was not found among his papers. However, a search in Karzhavin's archives failed to turn up any trace of the Charter, hence the possibility it was lost on his way back to his own country or even sold off due to its interesting nature. Additionally, he speculated that that the charter may have been instead taken from the college sometime during the 1781–1782 occupation of Williamsburg and that Bellini – who was responsible for the charter's care as college librarian – was using Karzhavin as a "scapegoat for [Bellini's] own real or imagined delinquency in not properly safeguarding it".

=== Later life in Russia ===
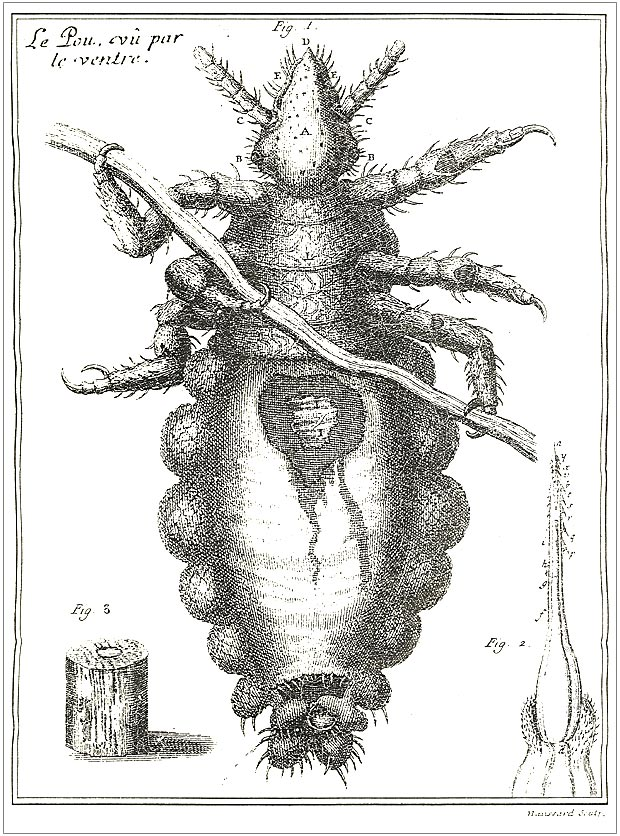
"The louse, ventral view"; sketch from Description of lice seen through a microscope, Karzhavin, 1789

Following his time in Virginia, Karzhavin finally reached Russia in 1788. He dealt in satire, opposing the Russian tsarist rule in his marginalia and signing Nabholz's satirical work. He also associated with the raznochintsy, including Vasily Bazhenov, Andrey Bukharsky, Johann Christian Nabholz, and Gerasim Zotov. Nabholz's papers were willed to Karzharin following his death.

Karzhavin wrote several books on linguistics and language education, including Notes on Word Derivations (Примечания словопроизводные) and The Leader Showing the Way to Better Pronunciation of French Letters and Sentences (1794, Вожак, показывающий путь к лучшему выговору букв и речений французских). He also translated works such as A Brief Account of the Memorable Adventures of Captain d'Civil (1791) and Description of the Course of Merchant and Other Caravans in the Arabian Steppes. As part of a revision of his uncle Erofey's 1791 book Remarques sur la langue russienne et sur son alphabet..., he published an autobiography of his experiences as part of his time in America. Dolgova noted that his personal interests and views often influenced what he translated or annotated, citing for example his condemnation of the treatment of the Indigenous peoples of the Americas in the Arabian Steppes translation.

Karzhavin applied to join the Collegium of Foreign Affairs but was declined, a decision Bolkhovitinov said was due to his visits to Western Europe and America, societies which contrasted with the feudal nature of Russia. He joined the Admiralty Board as a translator in 1797. Based at the Ruotsinsalmi sea fortress, he translated several maritime-related works, such as the Joseph Billings expedition and Édouard Thomas Burgues de Missiessy's On the Load of Warships. He was promoted to senior advisor in 1807.

=== Death and legacy ===
Bolkhovitinov remarked that, given the associations with visits to Europe and America, Karzhavin "never ceased to struggle with life's misfortunes" and during his later life "got by on casual earnings". Karzhavin died on 28 March 1812 in St. Petersburg.

Some of Karzhavin's papers are archived at the National Library of Russia and Pushkin House. According to Dolgova, he is "perhaps the only writer of the common ranks whose archive and library have been preserved, although not completely".

By 1980, when the article on Karzhavin's friendship with Bellini, Karzhavin had "until recently been known only to a few students of Russian history." Amidst a widespread Soviet trend of searching for 18th-century American perspectives in the Russian Enlightenment, Abel Startsev said that Karzhavin "[fit] the Marxian mold" than his contemporaries due to his non-aristocratic origins.

== Sources ==
- "Каржавин, Федор Васильевич" . Brockhaus and Efron Encyclopedic Dictionary (in Russian). 1906.
- Evans, Frank B. (1980). "Carlo Bellini and His Russian Friend Fedor Karzhavin". The Virginia Magazine of History and Biography. 88 (3): 338–354. ISSN 0042-6636.
