= Iosif Amusin =

Soviet historian, orientalist, and papyrologist (1910–1984)

Iosif Davidovich Amusin (Russian: Ио́сиф Дави́дович Аму́син; French: Joseph Amoussine, November 29, 1910, Vitebsk – June 12, 1984, Leningrad) was a Soviet historian, orientalist, hebraist and papyrologyst, and a specialist in the history of the Ancient Near East and Qumran studies.

== History ==
He studied at the history department of the Leningrad State University under professors such as Vasily Struve and Alexander Tyumenev.

Amusin was twice (in 1928 and 1938) arrested and sentenced for Zionist connections and "anti-Soviet" activity (acquitted posthumously in 1989). Graduated from the Historical Faculty of Leningrad University (1935–1941). Served as a medical officer during the Second World War.

After 1945, Amusin taught ancient history at the Leningrad Pedagogical Institute and Leningrad University until the anti-Semitic campaign against the so-called "cosmopolitanism," when he lost his job and, after a long period of unemployment, began lecturing at the Ulyanovsk Pedagogical Institute (1950–1954).

Upon returning in Leningrad in 1954, Amusin became a research fellow at the Institute of Archaeology and the Institute of Oriental Studies of the Soviet Academy of Sciences in Leningrad. From the late 1950s, he published about 100 works on the Qumran and Dead Sea Scrolls.
