= Carlo Bellini =

Italian-American academic (1735–1804)

Carlo Bellini (1735 – 1804), frequently anglicized as Charles Bellini, was an Italian–American secretary and educator who was the first professor of modern languages in North America. From Florence, Bellini worked as a secretary in the Grand Duke of Tuscany's tax office before traveling with his wife to the Colony of Virginia in 1774. There, he became acquainted with Thomas Jefferson, who secured Bellini a spot on the faculty of the College of William & Mary in Williamsburg in 1779. Bellini became the inaugural head of the college's modern languages department, teaching there until 1803.

Bellini maintained a correspondence with Jefferson, advising him regarding art purchases. While serving as a professor at the college, Bellini was selected to also serve as its librarian. He remained in Williamsburg during the Yorktown campaign of the American Revolutionary War. After the war, Bellini reported the loss of the college's 1693 charter, which had been in his care. Despite not having a mastery of many languages, Bellini continued teaching into old age and infirmity, and died in debt to the college.

Bellini's relationship with Jefferson has become the subject of folklore, with it erroneously suggested that Bellini had been brought from Italy by Philip Mazzei to assist in Jefferson's viniculture experiments and that the Bellini and Jefferson had become close friends. Bellini's status as the first modern languages professor on the continent is widely recognized. In 1924, a plaque commemorating Bellini was installed in the college's Wren Chapel and the Sons of Italy endowed a memorial room to him in Monroe Hall. A lecture series known as the Bellini Colloquium is held at the college.

== Early life and career ==
Relatively few specific details regarding Carlo Bellini's life prior to his arrival in Virginia are known. He was born in 1735 in Italy as the son of Leon Girolamo Bellini. A native of Florence, he was of noble descent. He had two younger sisters, Aurora and Luisa. Bellini married an older Italian widow, Gaspara, before being exiled from the Grand Duchy of Tuscany due to his liberalism. During his exile, Bellini taught in France. After returning from his exile, he worked as a clerk in the Grand Duke of Tuscany's tax office.

=== Arrival in Virginia ===
In the late summer of 1774, Bellini and his wife arrived in the Colony of Virginia aboard a ship also carrying goods and six Tuscan laborers. The folklore around Bellini has often erroneously claimed that Bellini came to Virginia in 1773 as part of Philip Mazzei's program to assist Thomas Jefferson in introducing viniculture to Virginia at an experimental vineyard in Albemarle County. Bellini had known Mazzei while the former was visiting London during his exile. After Mazzei arrived at Jamestown in 1773, he sent his brig back to Livorno to gather goods and laborers. It was aboard this ship that the Bellinis had sailed on to Virginia, but Mazzei may have been surprised by the couple's arrival. Mazzei described the couple as coming with the hopes that Carlo Bellini could secure a better job than his work in the Tuscan tax office and as Mazzei's friends. The Bellinis likely resided with Mazzei at the latter's home, Colle, for the next few years.

In June 1775, Bellini and the Tuscan vigneron Vincent Rossi volunteered at an Albemarle County militia muster to fight the British during the American Revolutionary War. Mazzei joined the two in arming themselves and joining Albemarle County militiamen as they marched to Warwick County and joined another militia led by Patrick Henry in maneuvering against a raiding British force. Jefferson began to seek Bellini's advice on foreign matters, and Bellini was probably the one who gave Jefferson the idea to dispatch Mazzei to seek funds for the American Revolution from the Grand Duke of Tuscany.

Jefferson also sought Bellini's advice for topics related to art. Bellini informed Jefferson regarding the art market prior to Jefferson's acquisitions in Paris for his home at Monticello. In 1778, Jefferson recommended that Henry – then the governor of Virginia – hire Bellini to help with Virginia's correspondence with the French government. Bellini was sworn in under the newly created title of Clerk of Foreign Correspondence on 30 June and he moved to Williamsburg, then Virginia's capital. He sent a letter to friends and family in Florence in November 1778 where he described himself as "Secretary of this State of Virginia for foreign affairs" – a title that he claimed exempted him from military service – and said that he had needed to purchase enslaved men and women; these claims reflected Bellini's tendency to exaggerate. This letter was soon published in two Florentine newspapers.

The only official translation Bellini is known to have produced as clerk was Henry Hamilton's statement threatening anti-British revolutionaries with attacks by Native Americans. Bellini successfully asked for the Virginia General Assembly to approve an increased annual salary of £600 for his clerkship in 1779. However, he did not accompany the government when Virginia's capital was moved to Richmond early the next year, ending his time in the role.

== Teaching at William & Mary ==
In August 1778, Bellini described himself as "Professor of modern languages in this University of Williamsburg", referring to the College of William & Mary. While he was not actually appointed as chair of modern languages at the college until late 1779, after Jefferson led the college's board of visitors in restructuring the college, Bellini may have begun teaching in 1778. With Jefferson as his benefactor, Bellini secured the position. While the college's statutes mandated students' fees would pay the wages of the faculty whose classes the students attended, Bellini was instead allotted a small salary. Bellini's courses replaced those for ancient languages, which the college professor George Wythe continued to offer privately.

As part of Jefferson's reforms, the Church of England (Anglicanism) was disestablished as Virginia's state church. While it was no longer formally part of the Anglican hierarchy, the college's faculty was largely made up of Anglican clergymen or laymen. Bellini's Catholicism was an exception that would have drawn the ire of his fellow faculty prior to disestablishment. Bellini was a Freemason alike fellow his faculty members James Madison – the college's president – Robert Andrews, John Dixon, and James McClurg. Bellini, who had been a member of a lodge in Florence, was in regular attendance at the Williamsburg lodge between October 1779 and July 1783.

Bellini was also exceptional in his demeanor, with the historian Thad Tate calling Bellini "one of the most colorful faculty members to serve the college during its first century" and that "he must have added a certain spark to life in provincial Williamsburg". The historian Ludwell B. Johnson described Bellini as having "the warmth and charm of his native Italy – women, he told his students, were the pabulum vitae ['food of life']". However, Bellini's classes did not draw many students and he would ultimately end his career suffering from multiple ailments.

Bellini's appointment made him the first professor of modern languages in North America. However, he was not a skilled linguist. Bellini preferred to communicate in Italian, as indicated by all but two of his surviving letters being in Italian. He had adequately translated French while he was working as a state secretary. According to Mazzei, "Bellini knew French very well and had a smattering of German and Spanish". Despite this, Bellini's fellow professor St. George Tucker said that students at the college could be expected to learn French, Italian, Spanish, and German – overstating Bellini's ability.

On 20 May 1780, the faculty voted to reclassify the contents of the college's library. They elected Bellini to succeed John Bracken as the college's librarian that same day. Resolutions passed by the faculty at the same time instructed all library books in circulation to return and for Bellini to permit lending of the library's books to only students and matriculated students.

=== Military occupation of Williamsburg ===
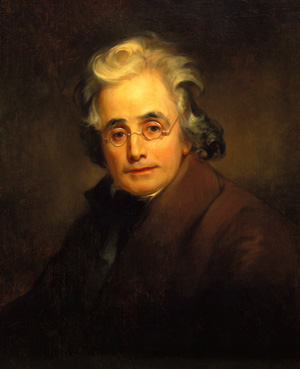
Peter Stephen Du Ponceau was among the Frenchmen who developed a positive opinion of Bellini during the 1781–1782 military occupation of Williamsburg.

In July 1781, the British began maneuvering their troops near the college, leading to faculty members – including President Madison – to flee. Beginning in late August, allied French and Continental Army troops occupied Williamsburg and its surroundings as part of the Yorktown campaign of the Revolutionary War. As fighting between them and the British occurred during the build up to the Siege of Yorktown, Bellini remained behind as the only professor in the city. During this time, the Bellinis resided within the Main Building (now called the Wren Building). There, he maintained watch on the college's property. The French officers found him affable, appreciating his understanding of both their language and society. Bellini enjoyed the attention he was receiving from French generals and nobles – which included François-Jean de Chastellux – and the substantial responsibility he had been entrusted with in protecting the university's property.

Taking pride that the French and Americans sought his company, Bellini gave into his tendency to exaggerate in order to impress them. When the French priest Claude Robin visited the library and spoke to Bellini in September 1781, he reported that the library contained approximately 3,000 volumes, a number also reported by the Continental Army physician James Thacher. Bellini was probably doubling the total size of the library's collection during his tours of the college's property; an American chaplain who was also present said that the library was sizable but lacked modern titles.

While the French linguist Peter Stephen Du Ponceau was secretary to the Continental Army's General Friedrich Wilhelm von Steuben in 1781, he met Bellini. Du Ponceau spoke Italian with Bellini while visiting Bellini's apartment. Du Ponceau later wrote that, upon hearing Italian being spoken by someone other than her husband, the undressed Gaspara Bellini rushed from another room, having forsaken clothing herself for fear that she would miss the opportunity to converse in her native language. The Bellinis related to Du Ponceau their dissatisfaction with the conditions in America and their own situation. Du Ponceau wrote that they told him that they wished to return to "la Bella Italia" but could not afford to do so. The reason Gaspara Bellini gave for coming to Virginia was "la Cieca passione" ("blind passion"), which Du Ponceau said "must have been very flattering to her husband". Du Ponceau found Carlo Bellini to be an educated man who was respected by his colleagues.

The college's rector, John Blair Jr., wrote to the Continental Army commander George Washington on 15 October 1781 to ask him to avoid unnecessarily occupying the college or damaging its property. According to Blair's letter, almost all the college campus's buildings – save for Bellini's apartment, apparatus room, and library – were being used to quarter French and Continental troops. According the Bellini, this occupation posed a threat to the college. Despite Blair's letter arriving the day before his victory at Yorktown, Washington received it and replied on 17 October, with Washington coldly saying that he believed that the need to house his many wounded soldiers would be sufficient to convince Bellini to permit the armies' use of the college's buildings. Bellini would the only professor to remain in Williamsburg for the two years that the college was closed because of the war.

George Wythe, a professor of the college and friend to Washington, wrote to Washington after the victory at Yorktown to also ask the general to avoid occupying and damaging the college. Washington wrote to Wythe, again saying that the occupation of the college was militarily necessary even though the fighting was over. The outcome of this occupation that had been feared by Bellini, Blair, and Wythe occurred on 23 November 1781: the college's President's House, which was being used as a hospital by the French, burned. The fire destroyed the college's library, its scientific instruments, and the college president's home. Despite initially assigning blame elsewhere, the French ultimately accepted responsibility for the damage.

=== Disappearance of the charter ===
As part of his duties as the college librarian, Bellini was particularly responsible for protecting the physical copy of the 1693 royal charter that had established the College of William & Mary. A 19th-century extract of the 28 March 1791 minutes from the college faculty's proceedings – the original minutes now being lost – serves as the only direct documentary evidence for what happened to the charter:

The Society being informed by M. Bellini that the original charter of this College which is lost, was some years past seen by him in the possession of a certain Karjavina, a native of Muscovy, who declared that it was his intention to deposit the same among the archives of St. Petersburg in Russia. Resolved etc.

The William & Mary professor Frank B. Evans, writing in a 1978 study of the charter and a 1980 article for The Virginia Magazine of History and Biography, identified the "Karjavina" from the minutes as the Russian trader Fedor Karzhavin, with whom Bellini had a friendship. Karzhavin, who had been educated in Paris, sailed from Martinique in April 1777 and reached Virginia for the first time by June. After advertising his capacity as a translator to the Continental Congress to no avail, he had travelled between North Carolina and Boston on foot before returning to Virginia in 1779. Evading raids by British troops, Karzhavin arrived in Williamsburg and sought work. He probably met Bellini that year – either through a mutual acquaintance or Bellini's role as Virginia's secretary for foreign correspondence – and Bellini may have helped Karzhavin put a notice of job search into the local paper.

Karzhavin wrote in a letter several years later that he spent six months working for Virginia's government before traveling back to Russia to represent the Continental Congress's interests before Catherine the Great, the Empress of Russia. These claims are unsubstantiated and may originate from Bellini having suggested such positions as possibilities for Karzhavin, who returned to Martinique in 1780. Karzhavin would return to Williamsburg in April 1785, leaving in April 1787. A 1788 letter from Bellini to Karzhavin indicates that Bellini, Madison, and Wythe were all fond of Karzhavin. It is more likely that Karzhavin would have taken the charter upon his second departure from Williamsburg than during his first trip. Evans wrote that its also possible that the charter was lost during the city's occupation during the winter of 1781–1782 and that Bellini was using Karzhavin as a "scapegoat for [Bellini's] own real or imagined delinquency in not properly safeguarding it".

=== Later career and death ===
Following the occupation, the Bellinis endured financial hardship. They were likely forced to find new lodgings in Williamsburg due to the Main Building undergoing renovations following its use as a hospital. By 1784, Bellini had taken extra work at the grammar school established by Walker Maury in the Capitol after Virginia's capital was moved to Richmond. According to Maury, Bellini could make time for this second job because few students enrolled in his courses.

Gaspara Bellini suffered what Mazzei called a "apoplectic stroke" in May 1784 that left her unable to use her limbs. Meanwhile, Carlo Bellini had suffered from gout since at least 1782 and his vision had degraded such he considered his eyes "useless" by 1788. While in France as United States Secretary of State, Jefferson sent Bellini a pair of glasses with a note that said "you are often the object of my thoughts, and always of my affection". Jefferson also forwarded a Spanish dictionary to Bellini in hopes that he would teach the language to Jefferson's nephew Peter Carr but it took over a year to reach Bellini.

Evans postulated that Bellini's irresponsible behavior with regards to the charter could be traced his career setbacks since 1779 and that Bellini's relationship with the college was particularly strained in 1790 and 1791, around the time he reported the charter's disappearance to the faculty. He repeatedly wrote to then-Secretary of State Jefferson in 1790 in hopes of getting a job in his office. Jefferson informed Bellini in June 1790 that no job was available. By January 1792, Jefferson informed Mazzei that he had not received correspondence from Bellini or his wife.

In May 1795, Jefferson wrote Mazzei to inform him that the Bellinis were both paralytic and deeply impoverished. Carlo Bellini also suffered a stroke and had trouble caring for his wife. Gaspara Bellini died in 1798, which her husband described to Jefferson as being "kindly delivered from a miserable existence". Bellini offered to give the portrait of his wife to Jefferson. By 1799, Bellini was unable to write his own letters and required a scribe. That same year, a college student described him as living poorly and alone near the former Governor's Palace in Williamsburg. After his wife's death and partially for want of companionship, Bellini purchased an enslaved woman named Lucy and her two children from the college. He also became interested in religion. He became a member of the Anglican Bruton Parish, possibly because there was no Catholic church in the city.

Johnson described Bellini as a "pitiable liability" by the end of his career. Louis H. Girardin replaced Bellini as the college's professor of modern languages in February 1803. Bellini died in 1804 and buried at an unknown site. Jefferson assisted in managing Bellini's estate, including the late professor's debt owed from purchasing the enslaved persons from the college, on behalf of Bellini's surviving sisters. Bellini's debts remained outstanding until 1816, after both his sisters had also died.

== Legacy ==
In October 1923, the Roma Lodge of the Sons of Italy announced that they would give a tablet honoring Bellini to the College of William & Mary. The tablet, which was sponsored by Luigi Carnovale of Chicago, was unveiled in the chapel of the Wren Building during a ceremony that was attended by hundreds of Italians on 27 January 1924. In November, the Sons of Italy also endowed a room in Bellini's honor in Monroe Hall, a newly-built dormitory at the college. As of 1929, no there were no commemorations of Bellini in his native Italy.

Several professors from the College of William & Mary have written studies of Bellini's life. The college president Lyon Gardiner Tyler produced a Carlos Castañeda, then a Spanish professor at the college, wrote a study on modern language education in the late 18th- and early 19th-century United States for the January–February 1925 edition of the Catholic Educational Review. Having worked with librarians and professors from several other universities, Castañeda was able to substantiate that Bellini was the first full faculty professor to teach modern languages in the United States. Italian-language biographies of Bellini by E. C. Branchi, then a professor of Italian and Spanish at the college, were published in the journals Il Carroccio and Italica in 1928 and 1929, respectively. The William & Mary professor Frank B. Evans covered Bellini in his 1978 study The Story of the Royal Charter of the College of William & Mary and in a 1980 article for The Virginia Magazine of History and Biography.

The current William & Mary Department of Modern Languages and Literatures, now comprising dozens of faculty members, traces its origins to Bellini. The department sponsors the annual Bellini Colloquium, a lecture series named for Bellini that allows the department's faculty members to publicly share their research.
