= Aleksandr Lyubishchev =

Soviet entomologist and philosopher

- Born: April 5, 1890; Saint Petersburg
- Died: August 31, 1972 (aged 82); Tolyatti
- Education: Doctor of Sciences in Agriculture
- Alma mater: Saint Petersburg State University
- Occupation: Entomologist, philosopher
- Employer: All-Russian Institute of Plant Protection (1930–1937); Bestuzhev Courses; V. I. Vernadsky Taurida National University

Aleksandr Lyubishchev (Russian: Александр Александрович Любищев; 1890, in Saint Petersburg – 1972) was a Soviet biologist (entomologist) and philosopher, Doctor of Sciences (1936), and professor. He retired in 1955. Lyubishchev called himself a nihilist. He was also a Platonist.

== Career ==
His ancestors were serfs of Count Aleksey Arakcheyev.

Lyubishchev graduated from the Saint Petersburg State University in 1911. He was a student of Alexander Gurwitsch. Then he taught on the Bestuzhev Courses, at the Tavrida National V.I. Vernadsky University, the Perm State University.

In 1921 he left Simferopol for Perm. In 1930, he moved to Leningrad. In 1938 he moved to Kyiv. Then he headed the laboratory in Bishkek for the Kyrgyz Academy of Sciences. From 1950 to 1955, Lyubishchev headed the Department of zoology at the Ulyanovsk State Pedagogical University.

In 1912, he published his first scientific article. Since the 1920s he worked in the field of agricultural entomology. He criticized the book The Genetical Theory of Natural Selection. Lyubishchev had a negative assessment of Cuban leader Fidel Castro.

Daniil Granin wrote the book about him called «Эта странная жизнь» (1974). This book made Lyubishchev popular. According to the book, Lyubishchev had a bit of a “mad scientist” image. His main work remained unpublished.

Nikolai Cholodny was his friend.
