= Charter of the College of William & Mary =

1693 English royal charter

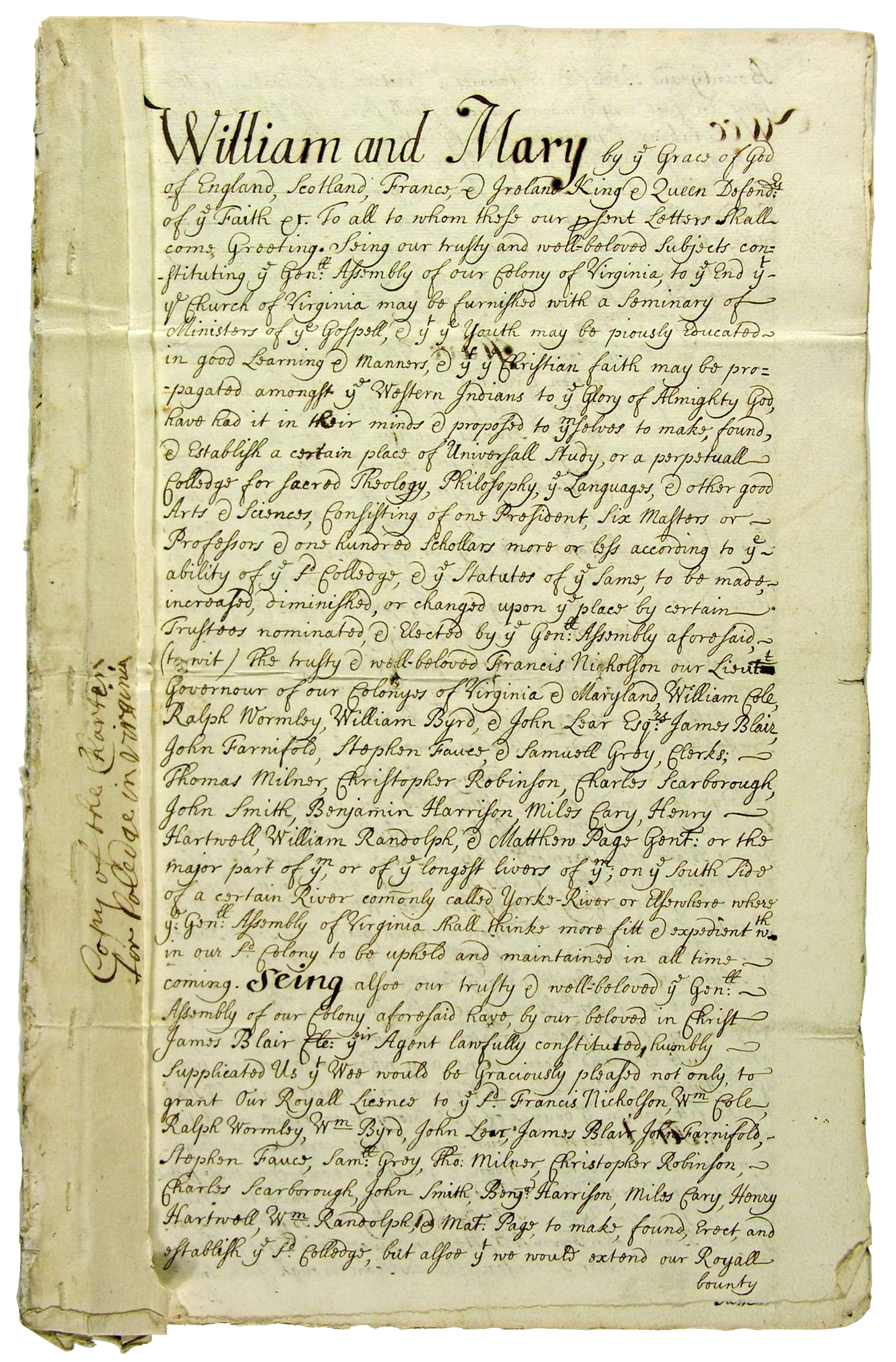
First page of the Andros copy of the charter of the College of William & Mary

On 8 February 1693, the royal charter establishing the College of William & Mary was issued by King William III and Queen Mary II of England. The charter established the first college in the Colony of Virginia and the second in what is now the United States, after Harvard in 1636. The document served as the college's constitution for nearly 90 years, establishing it as an extension of the British Imperial bureaucracy and Church of England hierarchy. The original document has been lost, but contemporary copies survive. The chartering is celebrated annually at the college on 8 February as Charter Day.

The charter was initially given to James Blair, the colony's commissary, who returned to Virginia and presented it to the Virginia General Assembly in September 1693. The college was constructed at Middle Plantation, where the city of Williamsburg was established in 1699. The charter intended for the college to operate a seminary for the colony and a mechanism for converting Native Americans, but it operated only as a grammar school for about two decades. One of the charter's provisions called for the eventual transfer of the college's governance to the faculty, which was ceremonially completed on 15 August 1729. During the 18th century, the college celebrated 15 August as Transfer Day.

The original charter was reported by Carlo Bellini to have been taken from the college in the 1780s, and reported as last being observed in the possession of the Russian trader Fedor Karzhavin. It is now considered lost, though contemporary and later copies survive. An 18th-century copy possibly made for Governor of Virginia Edmund Andros is occasionally displayed. Another 18th-century copy was previously held by Harvard. Both of these copies are now part of the William & Mary Libraries' special collections.

== Background ==
The Colony of Virginia, an English colony in North America, repeatedly had sought to establish a college during the 17th century. An initial plan to develop a college under the auspices of the Virginia Company at Henrico, a site near modern-day Richmond, was proposed in 1619. This college, which was intended to educate colonists and local Indians, was abandoned following the Powhatan attack of 1622. Social and political factors – including the collapse of the Virginia Company – served as barriers to a college's establishment in Virginia for several decades. The Stuart Restoration in 1660 reestablished the Church of England (Anglican church) in the colony and brought the royalist William Berkeley back as Virginia colonial governor. In the subsequent years, the Virginia General Assembly submitted petitions to the Crown asking for letters patent that would allow the colony to raise funds for the establishment of schools and colleges in Virginia, particularly for the education of Anglican ministers. An act passed in the General Assembly in 1661 which was meant to establish a college but did not have any effect. Instability in both England and Virginia – which reached a climax in the latter with the 1676 Bacon's Rebellion – still prevented the establishment of a college in the colony.

Over the 17th century, the population of Virginia grew to feature a substantial number of colonists educated at English and Scottish universities – particularly the University of Oxford – at a proportion greater than the New England Colonies. Many of those with university training were Anglican clergymen. Interest in a Virginian college continued to grow among Virginia's elite, and a new effort towards establishing a college began 1689 during Nathaniel Bacon's administration, shortly after the Glorious Revolution installed King William III and Queen Mary II as England's joint monarchs. This effort would be led by James Blair, a Scottish Anglican clergyman.

Blair, who had been educated at University of Aberdeen's Marischal College and University of Edinburgh, was appointed to represent the bishop of London's interests as the colony's commissary in 1689. His appointment was read before the General Assembly on 3 June 1690. For the two succeeding generations, Blair would exert substantial political and ecclesiastical influence in Virginia. At his first convocation of Virginia's clergy on 23 July 1690, Blair received support for his "Several Propositions" favoring the establishment of a college. Also on 3 June, Francis Nicholson had been sworn in to lead the colony as its lieutenant governor. Nicholson was a supporter of education and, alongside the General Assembly, backed Blair's efforts. John Page was credited in the 1699 May Day orations for initiating a February 1691 meeting that brought support for the college movement from the elite in Jamestown, then the colonial capital. In April 1691, the General Assembly established a committee to secure funds for a college and selected Blair to travel to England to secure a royal charter for this college. On 21 May, the General Assembly approved its instructions to Blair on securing a charter, a grant of arms, private donations, and a teacher for the college's grammar school.

== Chartering ==
=== Blair's arrival in London ===
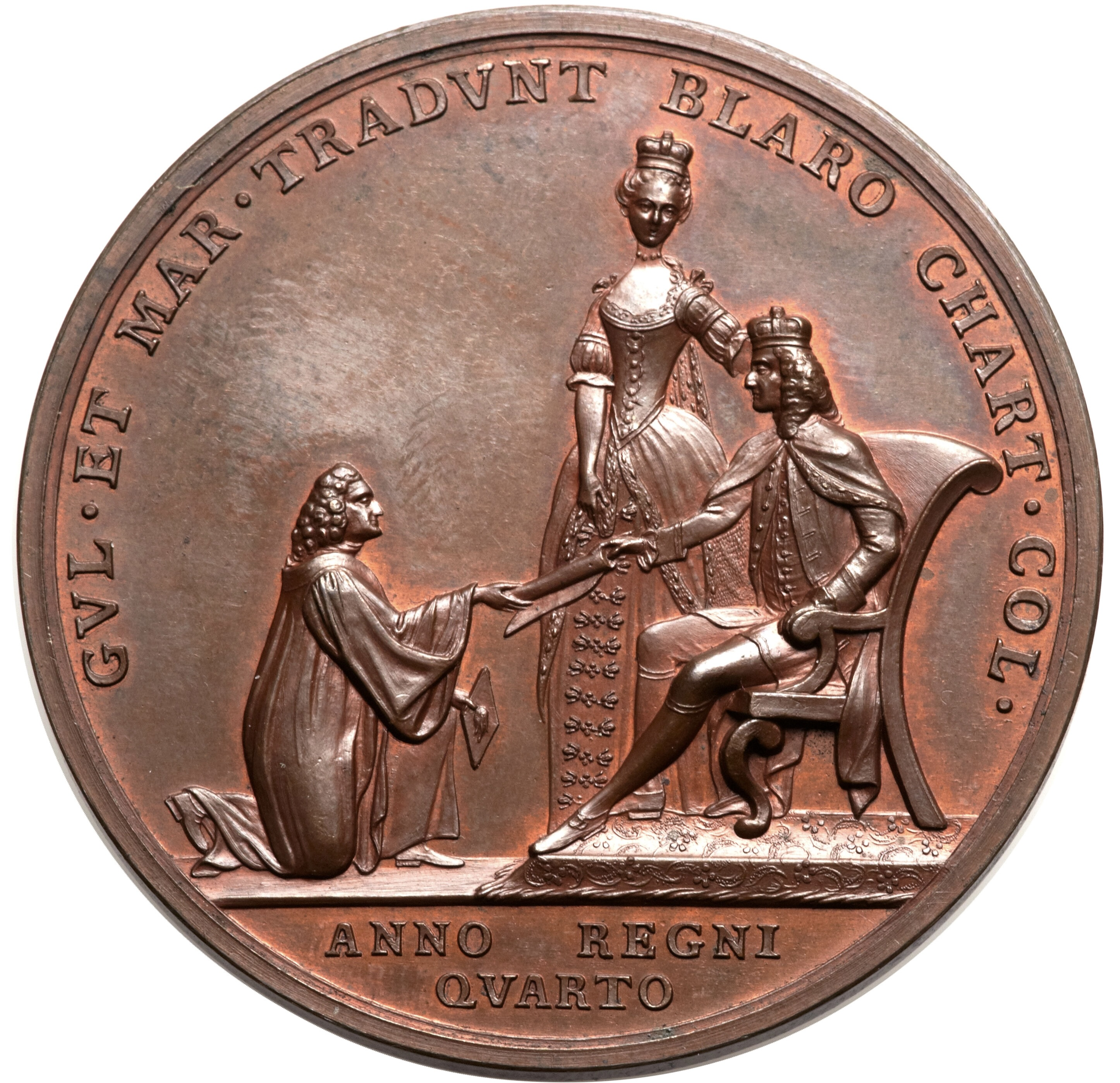
The reverse of the Botetourt Medal (18th-century copper striking shown) depicts Blair receiving the charter from King William III and Queen Mary II

In June 1691, Blair sailed from Lynnhaven Bay to Bristol. Blair arrived in London in early September 1691. His time in the city went unrecorded in contemporary accounts besides in public records and Blair's letters to Nicholson with the exception of long-unpublished details in Gilbert Burnet's History of His Own Time. A possibly apocryphal anecdote from Blair's efforts in London were detailed by Benjamin Franklin in a 1774 letter. Blair's 1691 instructions from the General Assembly regarding drafting the charter detailed that he was to consult the charters of other English colleges. According to these instructions, the new college's charter was to establish both the college and its grammar school as a place for boys and young men to learn "Lattin, Greek, & Hebrew Tongues, together wth Philosophy Mathematicks & Divinity". He was also instructed that the college's governmental structure should include 18 trustees, which were named in the instructions and included Nicholson.

Upon his arrival in London, Blair discovered that all the people he needed to discuss the proposed college with were not in the city or otherwise not in a position to assist him: Virginia's colonial agent was in Wales, King William was in Continental Europe, several bishops Blair knew were in their dioceses, and Bishop of London Henry Compton was ill and out of favor with William. Blair had previously lived in London and was acquainted with Bishop of Worcester Edward Stillingfleet. From Stillingfeet, Blair learned that Queen Mary favored the bishop and that she was a supporter of charitable ventures. Burnet, the bishop of Salisbury, also lent his influence in support of the college. Through Archbishop of Canterbury John Tillotson, Blair was able to get an audience with William. Blair, Tillotson, and former Virginia governor Lord Howard of Effingham went to the King on 12 November. William positively received Blair's description of the planned college, though it proved a limited success for Blair, as the college remained unchartered and William was soon distracted with military planning against the French.

=== Securing funding ===
Two days after the audience with the King, Blair was asked to send a financial request for the college to Compton and Tilloston, who met with Blair and backed the proposal. The proposal was then submitted to the Lords of Trade and Plantations, at which point it wound through the imperial bureaucracy for eight months, drawing some opposition over the perpetual allocation of Crown funds for the college. Blair spent that time seeking private financial support for the college. Burnet preached the sermon at the scientist Robert Boyle funeral, which saw the executors of Boyle's estate offer profits from the Brafferton Manor in Yorkshire in support of an Indian school at Virginia's college. This plan was likely not related to the similar objectives of the earlier Henrico plan, but instead reflected similar efforts then ongoing at Harvard College. The lords of trade, the merchant Micajah Perry, and Blair also negotiated an arrangement where the proposed college would receive £300 from three accused pirates.

Benjamin Franklin's 1774 letter reported that, as Blair sought to secure royal funds for the college from the Lords of the Treasury, he tried to convince the naval treasurer Edward Seymour to back the funding in Christian consideration for the souls of Virginia's residents. According to Franklin, Seymour said in reply, "Souls! Damn your souls. Make tobacco!" Regardless of the veracity of the account, the treasury did oppose the funding, but Blair had prevailed against them by 1 September 1692. On that date, Queen Mary approved Blair's request for money from quit-rents and tobacco taxes putting £1985:18:10 towards a Virginian college and "free school" (the term used in Blair's instructions regarding the college's grammar school) and provided two land grants totaling 20,000 acres in Virginia's Blackwater Swamp and Pamunkey Neck for the college to draw revenue from. In exchange, the college would pay a symbolic quit-rent of two Latin verses each Guy Fawkes Night, 5 November.

=== Drafting and approval ===
Blair prepared the text for the college's charter with the assistance of two London lawyers. These lawyers were possibly Robert Sawyer – who had served as Attorney General for England and Wales – and Heneage Finch – who had served as Solicitor General for England and Wales. Nicholson recommended a "Robert Sawyer & Mr. Finch" for the task, and Blair wrote to Nicholson to thank him for his "advice about the lawyers". The two lawyers had experience with royal charters from having previously forced boroughs and proprietary colonies like the Massachusetts Bay Colony to surrender their charters in order to increase the Crown's authority over them. Though Sawyer died seven months before the college's charter was granted, both were likely involved in its drafting.

The college charter underwent the four steps of copying required for such a document. First, a warrant copy was written in English by the treasury. The second copy was the King's bill, which was created by the attorney general in Latin with italicized script on five large sheets, each of which was signed by the King. The third copy was the writ of the privy seal, also in italicized Latin, where the King and Queen directed the Lords Commissioners of the Great Seal to make the record patent. The fourth copy was the enrollment, which was in Latin written in chancery hand and the copy entered into the government's patent rolls. Blair had the charter name the new college as the College of William and Mary in Virginia, making it the namesake of the King and Queen in the hope that this would help overcome opposition to its establishment.

On 8 February 1693 of the Julian calendar as then used by England (18 February on the Gregorian calendar), King William and Queen Mary granted the college's charter with a privy seal to Blair at their court in Kensington Palace. Blair gave a copy of the charter to the Commissioners of Customs in London, purchased boxes to store the charter and seal, and sailed to Virginia via Portsmouth with several copies of the charter in English and Latin. Blair presented the charter to the other members of the Virginia Governor's Council – the General Assembly's upper house – and Virginia's new governor, Edmund Andros, on 1 September 1693. He then read it before the next joint session of the General Assembly, where both the council and House of Burgesses – the General Assembly's lower house – passed memorials thanking the King and Queen for their actions and paid Blair a £250 honorarium and £600 for his expenses on the trip.

== Contents ==
The 1693 royal charter for the College of William & Mary is a twelve-page document originally produced in both English and Latin versions. It founded the college, explained its purposes, formulated its governmental structure, and detailed its revenue sources. In keeping with English custom of the period, the charter is dated to the previous year. Approved by King William III and Mary II of England with a privy seal, it makes the College of William & Mary as the only college or university in what is now the United States to have been founded by royal decree, as well as the second-oldest college in what is now the US, behind only Harvard. For nearly 90 years, the charter served as the college's constitution.

Blair was largely responsible for the charter's content, with the lawyers having served to ensure legal acceptability. He was probably influenced by the charters for English and Scottish universities, though the 1693 charter does not resemble any specific university's charter. Reflecting university constituencies of the Cambridge University and Oxford University in the English House of Commons, the charter allocated a seat in the House of Burgesses held by a candidate elected by the college's president and its masters.

The charter established two primary objectives for the college, described in the document's opening paragraph,. The secular and religious interests of Virginian elite were accommodated through the charter's prescription that the college would be "a certain Place of universal Study, a perpetual College of Divinity, Philosophy, Languages, and other good Arts and Sciences, consisting of one President, six Masters or Professors, and an hundred Scholars more or less". The first, secular, and provincial purpose was to educate young Virginian men in "letters and manners" in preparation for their participation in the colony's public sector through the college's grammar school and philosophy faculty. The second, religious, and imperial purpose was to Christianize local Native Americans through its Indian school and to function as a seminary training men as ministers for the Anglican church in Virginia through the college's divinity courses. The inclusion of the evangelization of Indians as part of the college's mission was a concession to the Boyle estate's desires.

Trustees of the College of William & Mary
Name	Position
Francis Nicholson	Former lieutenant governor
William Cole	Councilor
Ralph Wormeley Jr.	Councilor
William Byrd I	Councilor
John Lear	Councilor
James Blair	Commissary
John Farnifold	Cleric
Stephen Fouace	Cleric
Samuel Gray	Cleric
Thomas Milner	Burgess
Christopher Robinson	Burgess
Charles Scarborough	Burgess
John Smith	Burgess
Benjamin Harrison II	Burgess
Miles Cary	Burgess
Henry Hartwell	Burgess
William Randolph	Burgess
Matthew Page	Burgess

The charter established how the college's property, revenue, and faculty selection would be administered. Its first paragraph named 18 trustees which were to temporarily manage the college until a full faculty had been acquired, at which point the role of administering the property and revenue would pass to its president and its masters. The trustees included Nicholson – who had been moved to the Colony of Maryland in September 1692 – four members of the Governor's Council, Blair, three other clergymen, and nine members of the House of Burgesses. The charter was not to be transferred to the college's president and its masters until there were six masters and the college had advanced courses in philosophy and divinity. Out of practicality, Blair had included provisions in the charter allowing for the grammar school to be opened first. The trustees administered the college until the 1729 transfer—far longer than any had anticipated and by which point only two of the trustees were still alive.

The successors to the trustees, 18 to 20 men forming a body known as the Board of Visitors or Visitors and Governors, were detailed in the charter's articles IX and X. The original intention was for the trustees to become the visitors upon the transfer. The trustees and the visitors were to serve as the college's permanent governors and were to possess "full and absolute liberty, power and authority, of making, enacting, framing and establishing such and so many rules, laws, statutes, orders and injunctions" for the college. The Board of Visitors were given the authority to fill vacancies by a majority vote of visitors approving another Virginian to join their number. Through his involvement in the charter's drafting and successful lobbying of Nicholson, the Blair had the charter name him to the college's presidency for life, a trustee position, and the place as the college's first rector. His successors as rector were to be elected by the Board of Visitors annually.

The position of Chancellor of the College of William & Mary was also established in the charter. The document named Henry Compton to the first seven-year term. The Board of Visitors and rector were empowered to select "eminent and discreet person[s]" as subsequent chancellors. Compton's successors were typically other Bishops of London or Archbishops of Canterbury for the next 70 years, with many of these treating their chancellorship as more than just a ceremonial role.

Substantial portions of the document confirmed the land grants and other revenue sources given to the college in 1692. The specific location of the college's campus was not identified within the charter, but it did include the suggestion that it would be somewhere near the Port of York on the York River. This location had been the preferred site in 1691 when the General Assembly dispatched Blair, but debates after the charter's arrival in Virginia resulted the selection of a site approximately equidistant between the York and James Rivers. The charter specified that the college would also have a seal.

== Transfer and statutes ==
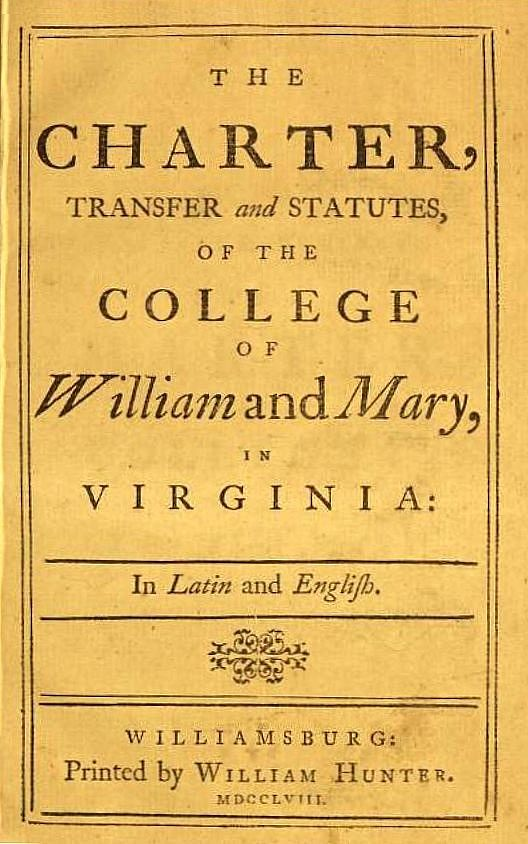
A printed version of the charter, transfer, and statues published in 1758

The provisions for the charter's transfer from the trustees required that the college have a president and six masters. However, since even before the charter had been granted, Blair found it difficult to convince professors to leave England's universities for Virginia. It took until 1728 for the college to have the requisite six masters, by which point only three of the 18 trustees were still alive: Blair, Nicholson, and Stephen Fouace. While Blair was friends with Fouace, Blair and Nicholson had become enemies. Nicholson, an opponent of alcohol consumption, objected to the transfer on the grounds that Blair intended to derive revenue for the college from a tax on liquor in Virginia. Nicholson published a pamphlet attacking Blair and opposing the charter's transfer, though Nicholson died on 5 March 1728 before Blair was able to have a response published.

In 1727, Blair was again in England and met with Fouace. That year, the two prepared the transfer documents, which included statutes largely aligned with the original intentions of the 1693 charter. As with the 1693 charter, the 1727 statues show influence from the constitutional documents of Scottish and English universities. These influences are particularly present in the academic specifications and confirmation that the transfer would enable the college to have a seat representing in the House of Burgesses. The statutes also gave the faculty the ability to later revise the statutes.

The statutes deviated from its English and Scottish precedents in how the college would be administered. It was divided into four schools: the grammar school, the Indian school, the philosophy college, and the divinity school. The role of the college's president was equivalent to that of the six masters – a concession by the autocratic but aging Blair towards democracy and a reflection of the charter's original intention to grant the faculty broad authority. It also made the president, the masters, and the Board of Visitors all involved in the daily affairs of the college. The results were disputes between the visitors and the faculty throughout the 18th century. The statutes also transferred ownership of those enslaved under the trustees to the faculty.

Blair left England soon after he and Fouace signed the transfer documents on 24 June 1727, with John Randolph – a former student at the college – going to England in the middle of 1728 to conclude matters related to the transfer. On 27 February 1729, the transfer of the college's charter was signed over from the trustees to Blair as president and the college's masters. The charter was officially transferred in a ceremony on 15 August 1729. That date would be formally celebrated at the college through the 18th century as Transfer Day and was treated as the anniversary of the college's founding.

== Disappearance and later history ==
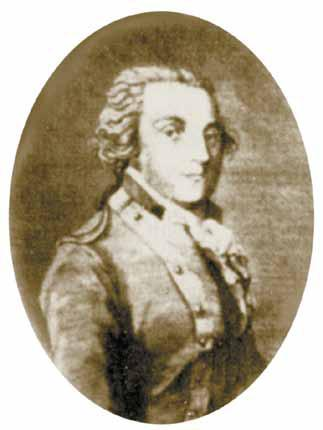
The trader Fedor Karzhavin may have taken the original copy of the charter with him to Russia.

The location of the original copy of the charter is unknown and the document is presumed lost. Frank B. Evans wrote in his 1978 book The Story of the Royal Charter of the College of William & Mary that "The story of the [1693 charter] would be simpler, but less interesting, were it not for the story of a document which is lost". The only record of the charter's disappearance from the college is a 19th-century extract of the 28 March 1791 minutes from the college faculty's proceedings; the original minutes are themselves lost, as they were likely destroyed in an 1862 fire at the Wren Building. The extract reads as follows:

The Society being informed by M. Bellini that the original charter of this College which is lost, was some years past seen by him in the possession of a certain Karjavina, a native of Muscovy, who declared that it was his intention to deposit the same among the archives of St. Petersburg in Russia. Resolved etc.

Carlo Bellini, the college's librarian and modern languages professor, had been responsible for the charter's care. In his 1978 work and a 1980 article in The Virginia Magazine of History and Biography, Evans identified that "Karjavina" was the Russian trader Fedor Karzhavin, with whom Bellini had a friendship. Karzhavin travelled to Virginia twice, leaving in 1780 and 1787, with Evans suggesting that the latter date was the more likely instance when Karzhavin may have left with the charter. While Karzhavin may have taken the charter with hopes of selling it, it was not found among his papers. It is possible that the charter may have been taken from the college sometime during the French occupation of Williamsburg in 1781 and 1782 during and after the Yorktown campaign of the American Revolutionary War. In 1979, the William & Mary archivist Kay Domine reported that there had been recent efforts to determine if the charter was among the items deposited in the St. Petersburg archives.

The two 17th-century manuscript copies of the charter that are known to survive are in the possession of the College of William & Mary. What is known as the "Andros copy" is believed to be a copy given to the Virginia governor Edmund Andros. In 1978, Evans speculated that this copy was translated from Latin to English for Andros by Secretary of Virginia Ralph Wormeley Jr. Minutes from the proceedings of the college's faculty on 9 April 1865 mention that the copy of the charter "which was sent to this country by Sir Edmond Andros" was lost as part of petition to Queen Victoria to send a new certified copy of the charter. At a 1977 auction, the college purchased the Andros copy. It is currently in William & Mary's University Archives. What is known as the "Harvard copy" was discovered in an attic at Harvard University and was gifted by Harvard to William & Mary in 1931. Prior to its donation, the Harvard copy received water damage.

In 1736, William Parks of Williamsburg printed copies of the 1693 charter and the statutes in an effort to ingratiate himself with the college faculty. It was not the first printing of the charter, but it became the best known. Three copies of the 1736 Parks printing survive.

The reverse of the Botetourt Medal, an annually awarded gold medal given to the top-performing undergraduate students at the College of William & Mary, depicts Blair receiving the charter from King William and Queen Mary. Named for Norborne Berkeley, 4th Baron Botetourt, and designed by Thomas Pingo, the medal was first awarded from 1772 through 1775 and was revived in the 20th century.

=== Charter Day ===
On each 8 February, the College of William & Mary observes the anniversary of its chartering with a celebration known as Charter Day. The celebration began in the 20th century under the direction of the college president John Stewart Bryan. At the inaugural 1937 celebration, the celebration was known as Founders' Day. Bryan, who was known for his public flair, had the festivities include a procession of faculty, a recitation of excerpts from the charter, and addresses.

At recitations of the charter at Charter Day celebrations, the passage containing "a certain Place of universal Study" is regularly intoned. The phrase rendered in English as "place of universal study" appears in the Latin-language versions of the charter as studium generale. Relying on this phrase from the charter that is emphasized in the annual recitations, a 2020 article in the journal William & Mary Law Review Online by the William & Mary Law School professor Thomas J. McSweeney and the law school students Katharine Ello and Elsbeth O'Brien held that the College of William & Mary had been founded as not just a college, but as a university. William & Mary is generally considered to have become a university following reforms in 1779 and refers to itself as the oldest university in the US.
