= Thomas Madison (politician) =

American politician

Member of the Virginia House of Delegates representing Botetourt County
- In office 1780–1781 Serving with John Wood
- Preceded by: Andrew Lewis
- Succeeded by: Samuel Lewis

Member of the Virginia House of Delegates representing Botetourt County
- In office 1782–1783 Serving with Thomas Lewis
- Preceded by: Samuel Lewis
- Succeeded by: John Breckinridge

Member of the Virginia House of Delegates representing Botetourt County
- In office 1793–1797 Serving with John Beale, Martin McFerran, William Lewis, James Breckinridge
- Preceded by: George Hancock
- Succeeded by: John Miller

Personal details
- Born: 1746 Augusta County, Virginia
- Died: 1798 (51-53)
- Spouse: Susanna Henry
- Parents: John Madison (father); Agatha Strother (mother)
- Relatives: James Madison (second cousin); George Madison (brother); Reverend James Madison (brother)

Thomas Madison (1746–1798) was a soldier, planter and politician in Revolutionary-era Virginia, who served several terms (part-time) in the Virginia House of Delegates representing Botetourt County, Virginia (whose seat is at Fincastle) after its creation from Augusta County in 1770.

He was born in Augusta County, Virginia, the son of John and Agatha (Strother) Madison; his brothers included Governor George Madison and the Reverend James Madison. He was a second cousin to United States president James Madison.

A patriot like his brothers during the American Revolutionary War, this Madison was one of the 13 signers of the Fincastle Resolutions in 1775. He served as sheriff of Augusta County and as a commissary during the 1776 expedition against the Cherokees. His wife was Susanna Henry, sister of Virginia governor Patrick Henry. The Virginia General Assembly created Botetourt County from Augusta County shortly before the war, and after independence, Botetourt County voters several times elected this Madison to represent them (part time) as one of their representatives in the Virginia House of Delegates.
