= Pogodin =

Pogodin (Russian: Погодин) is a Russian masculine surname originating from the noun pogoda meaning weather; its feminine counterpart is Pogodina. It may refer to the following notable people:

- Arkady Pogodin (1901—1975), Soviet singer
- Dmitry Pogodin (1907—1943), Russian military officer
- Mikhail Pogodin (1800-1875), historian and journalist
- Nikolai Pogodin (1900-1962), pseudonym of N. F. Stukalov, playwright
- Oleg Pogodin (b. 1965), film director and scriptwriter
- Olga Pogodina (born 1976), Russian actress
- Serhiy Pohodin (b. 1968), Ukrainian footballer and coach

== See also ==
- Pogodin, Volgograd Oblast, a rural locality in Russia
