= George Madison =

American politician and 6th Governor of Kentucky

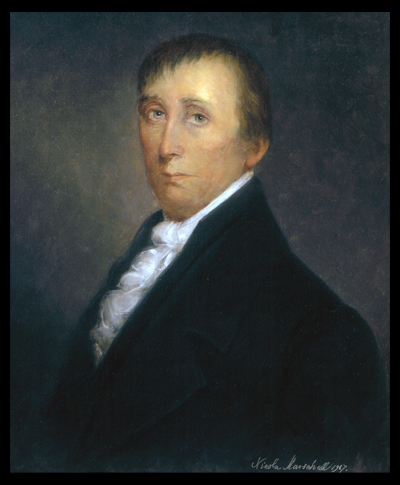
- Posthumous portrait by Nicola Marschall, 1907

6th Governor of Kentucky
- In office September 5, 1816 – October 14, 1816
- Lieutenant: Gabriel Slaughter
- Preceded by: Isaac Shelby
- Succeeded by: Gabriel Slaughter

Personal details
- Born: June 1763 Augusta County, Virginia
- Died: October 14, 1816 (aged 53) Paris, Kentucky
- Resting place: Frankfort Cemetery
- Party: Democratic-Republican
- Spouse: Jane Smith
- Relations: Brother of Bishop James Madison and Thomas Madison; cousin of President James Madison
- Profession: Soldier

Military service
- Allegiance: United States
- Branch/service: Continental Army; Kentucky militia
- Rank: Major
- Battles/wars: American Revolutionary War; Northwest Indian War; War of 1812

George Madison (June 1763 – October 14, 1816) was the sixth governor of Kentucky. He was the first governor of Kentucky to die in office, serving only a few weeks in 1816. Little is known of Madison's early life. He was a member of the influential Madison family of Virginia, and was a second cousin to President James Madison. He served with distinction in three wars – the Revolutionary War, Northwest Indian War, and War of 1812. He was twice wounded in the Northwest Indian War, and in the War of 1812 he was taken prisoner following the Battle of Frenchtown in Michigan.

Madison's political experience before becoming governor consisted of a twenty-year tenure as state auditor. Although his military service made him extremely popular in Kentucky, he sought no higher office until the citizens insisted he run for governor in 1816. James Johnson, his only challenger in the race, dropped out early due to Madison's overwhelming popularity, and Madison was elected without opposition. A few weeks later, he became the first Kentucky governor to die in office. Opponents of his lieutenant governor, Gabriel Slaughter, mounted a popular but unsuccessful challenge to Slaughter's succeeding Madison in office.

== Early life ==
George Madison was born in June 1763 in the portion of Augusta County, Virginia, that eventually became Rockingham County.^{[a]} His parents were John and Agatha (Strother) Madison. His brother James became the Episcopal bishop of Virginia and the president of the College of William & Mary. Another brother was Captain Thomas Madison. They were second cousins to President James Madison.

Madison was educated in the local schools and also received instruction at home. Before he was legally old enough to enlist, he entered the Continental Army as a private during the Revolutionary War.

It is not known when Madison moved to Kentucky, but land records in Lincoln County indicate he and his brother Gabriel were there by at least 1784. He married Jane Smith and they had four children – Agatha, William, Myra, and George.^{[b]} Jane Smith-Madison died in 1811.

== Service in the Northwest Indian War ==
Madison served with the Kentucky militia during the Northwest Indian War. He was a subaltern in Arthur St. Clair's army in the American defeat at the Battle of the Wabash on November 4, 1791. During the retreat, a soldier named William Kennan found Madison sitting on a log. Kennan was being pursued by Indians and admonished Madison to run, but Madison, who was already known to be of frail constitution, stood to reveal that he had been badly wounded and was bleeding profusely. Kennan quickly retrieved an abandoned horse he had seen; he helped Madison astride the horse, and they both escaped.

Later in the war, Madison served under Major John Adair. On November 5, 1792, Adair's men were encamped near Fort St. Clair when they were ambushed by an Indian force under the command of Little Turtle. Adair ordered a retreat, then rallied his men and divided them into three groups. He ordered those under Madison to turn the enemy's flank, but they failed and Madison was wounded again in this battle. Following this, Adair withdrew to Fort St. Clair. In Adair's report to Brigadier General James Wilkinson, he wrote: "Madison's bravery and conduct need no comment; they are well-known."

== Political career ==
Governor Isaac Shelby appointed Madison as Auditor of Public Accounts on March 7, 1796. He served in this capacity in state government for twenty years. He never sought a higher office but 19th-century historian Lewis Collins said that "there was no office within the gift of the people which he could not have easily attained, without the slightest solicitation." In 1800, Madison was appointed as a trustee of the Kentucky Seminary in Franklin County. On December 5, 1806, he served on a grand jury in the case of Aaron Burr's conduct; they did not find grounds for treason charges. Madison was appointed director of the Bank of Kentucky later that year.

During the War of 1812, Governor Shelby called for volunteers to serve in the Army of the Northwest. Colonel John Allen raised a regiment, and Madison was commissioned as his second-in-command. The regiment, known as the 1st Rifle Regiment of Kentucky Volunteers, fought under James Winchester at the Battle of Frenchtown. Winchester was captured by General Henry Procter, but about four hundred men under Madison repelled several charges by British troops. Madison's men believed they had won when they observed a white flag in the midst of the British force, but discovered the flag was being waved by Winchester as an order for Madison's force to surrender.

When Madison discovered that Winchester was waving the flag, he refused the order to surrender on grounds that, as a prisoner, Winchester had no authority to issue it. Procter demanded Madison's unconditional surrender, but Madison insisted that the terms of surrender include Procter's protection of the American prisoners from the Indian allies of the British. Procter initially balked at anything but an unconditional surrender, but after Madison's promise that the Americans would "sell their lives as dearly as possible", Procter acquiesced.

Procter had taken as many prisoners as he had soldiers, and had little power to enforce the terms he had agreed to. The American non-commissioned officers were paroled to return home. Madison and the other officers were taken to Fort Malden, then on to a prison in Quebec. The American wounded who could not march were left under the care of American physicians. Shortly after the battle, the Indians looted the American provisions, which included a large quantity of whiskey. Drunk and violent, they slaughtered many of the American wounded in what became known as the River Raisin Massacre.

Madison was freed from prison a year after his capture, as part of a prisoner exchange. He returned to Kentucky following his release and was honored at a public dinner on September 6, 1814. In 1816, he resigned as auditor of public accounts due to failing health. But, submitting to public demand, he became a candidate for governor later that year. James Johnson, the other candidate for office, withdrew from the race due to Madison's popularity, thus the latter was elected without opposition.

== Death and aftermath ==
Madison traveled to Blue Lick Springs for his health soon after the election, but was too weak to return to Frankfort for the inauguration. A Bourbon County justice of the peace administered the oath of office on September 5, 1816, at the springs. Madison's only official act of office was the appointment of Colonel Charles S. Todd as secretary of state. He died on October 14, 1816, just weeks into his term, the first governor of the state to die in office. He is buried in Frankfort Cemetery.

Opponents of his lieutenant governor, Gabriel Slaughter, immediately challenged his ascendancy to the governorship. They claimed that a governor should not be allowed to serve without having been elected to that office by the people. A measure calling for a special gubernatorial election easily passed the state House of Representatives, but failed in the senate by a vote of 18–14. Slaughter was allowed to exercise the powers of the governor, but many government officials and citizens of the state refused to call him by that title, opting for "acting governor" or "lieutenant governor" instead.

== See also ==
- History of Kentucky
- Thomas S. Hinde, close friend of the Madison family, and neighbor in Kentucky.

== Notes ==
^[a]Powell, Encyclopedia of Kentucky, and NGA give Madison's birthplace as Augusta County. Harrison and Hopkins both give Rockingham County.
^[b]Encyclopedia of Kentucky names these four children. Powell names only two: George and Myra. Hopkins references five children, but does not name them.

Political offices
Preceded by Isaac Shelby	Governor of Kentucky; 1816	Succeeded by Gabriel Slaughter
