= Madhavan K. Palat =

Indian historian and political commentator

Madhavan Kezhkepat Palat (born 9 February 1947) is an Indian historian, scholar of modern world, and political commentator. He is an expert on European and Russian history. In an academic career extending over nearly five decades, he has played a seminal role in promoting understanding of Russian history, culture, literature, and society in India.

== Biography ==
Madhavan Kezhkepat Palat was born in a distinguished family from the southern state of Kerala in India. His father, the late Mangat Gopal Menon, belonged to the Indian Civil Service (ICS). After taking his B. A. (Honours) degree in history from the University of Delhi, (St. Stephen's College, Delhi), India, in 1966, Madhavan Palat read history at Christ's College, Cambridge (matriculation 1966), and was admitted to the B. A. degree in 1968. He then went on for graduate studies to St. Antony's College, Oxford, in 1969, where he pursued his research on modern Russian history and was awarded the D.Phil. degree in 1974.

In 1974, Madhavan K. Palat joined the faculty of the Jawaharlal Nehru University, Delhi, India, where, in 1989, he was appointed Professor of Russian and European History at the Centre for Historical Studies, a position he held until his voluntary retirement from the university in 2004. He was also Dean, School of Social Sciences, Jawaharlal Nehru University (2003–04).

His area of specialisation, Russian and European history, is rare in a country where few historians have ventured out of Indian History. From 1974 to 2004, he taught non-Indian history and carried out research in that area at the Centre for Historical Studies, Jawaharlal Nehru University.

He was a visiting professor of Imperial Russian history at the University of Chicago (2006). Madhavan Palat was National Fellow, Indian Institute of Advanced Studies, Shimla, India 2010–2011. Since 2012, he has also been a member of the IIAS Governing Body. Since 2011, he has been the Editor of the Selected Works of Jawaharlal Nehru. Under his editorship, about 20 volumes of this important source of primary research have already been published. He is also a Distinguished Fellow at the Institute of Peace and Conflict Studies, a think tank based in New Delhi, India.

Madhavan K. Palat has also held several other important positions, both in India and abroad. He is a trustee of the Jawaharlal Nehru Memorial Fund. He is also a member of the National Committee on Commemoration of 125th Birth Anniversary of Jawaharlal Nehru. In 1991, Madhavan K. Palat was president of the section on ‘Countries other than India’, Indian History Congress, where he delivered his lecture, Forms of Union: Russian Empires and the Soviet Union. During 1992–94, he was senior fellow, Nehru Memorial Museum & Library, New Delhi, India.

Between 2001 and 2003, he was a member of Eminent Persons Group, Governments of India and Russia, to advise on India–Russia relations. He was also a member of the Committee on Indo-Russian Relations, Ministry of External Affairs, New Delhi (2002). In 2002–03, Madhavan K Palat was Member, Committee on the National Defence University, Ministry of Defence, New Delhi. He was appointed Honorary Fellow, Maulana Abul Kalam Azad Institute of Asian Studies, Kolkata (2008). Madhavan K Palat has been Member, Executive Council, Association of Indian Labour Historians, New Delhi since 1998. From 1987 to 2006, he was Correspondent, Revue Européenne des Migrations Internationales, I.N.E.D., Paris. He has been Member, Council of the Association of Russian Philosophy, Russian State University for the Humanities, Moscow, Russia since 2001. Madhavan Palat is also associate member of the University of Chicago Centre for East European and Russian/Eurasian Studies (CEERES) University of Chicago.

In recent years, he has written and lectured extensively on important historical figures, ideas, and trends. His lecture on Hobsbawm, titled 'The Interesting Ideas of Eric Hobsbawm', delivered at Nehru Memorial Museum & Library (NMML) in 2012, the lecture on Dostoyevsky, titled 'The Grand Inquisitor and the Holy Fool', delivered on the Foundation Day of the Indian Council of Historical Research (ICHR) in 2014, the lecture on Nationalism: Universal, Composite, and Unitary, delivered in November 2014 on the occasion of 125th birth anniversary celebrations of Jawaharlal Nehru, the lecture on 'History and Memory', delivered at Jawaharlal Nehru University in 2014, and the one titled ' Geopolitics or the Dominion of the World', delivered at Nehru Memorial Museum & Library (NMML) in March 2015 fall in this category and have been published as independent papers. In November 2017, he delivered his lecture Utopia and Dystopia in Revolutionary Russia: The Russian Revolution Centenary Lecture. In November 2019, Madhavan Palat delivered the Jawaharlal Nehru Memorial Lecture titled The Spiritual in Nehru's Secular Imagination.

== Books and edited collections ==
- Social Identities in Revolutionary Russia, ed. (Macmillan, Palgrave, UK, and St Martin's Press, New York, 2001).
- History of Civilizations of Central Asia, ed., vol. 6, Towards the Contemporary Period: From The Mid-Nineteenth Century To The End Of The Twentieth Century, UNESCO, Paris 2005.
- ‘Russia: The Time of Troubles,’ Special Number, Economic and Political Weekly, vol 28, no 51,18 December 1993, and translated the following articles from the Russian:
- V. V. Serbinenko, ‘Russian Idea and Prospects for Democracy,’ pp. 2793–2798.
- Leonid Shebarshin, ‘Reflections on the KGB in Russia,’ pp 2829–2832.
- Leokadia Drobizheva, ‘Russian Ethnic Attitudes in Changing Political Situations,’pp. 2833–2836.
- ‘The Russian Enigma,’ India International Centre Quarterly, Summer – Monsoon, 1994; also issued as Rethinking Russia, UBS Publishers, Delhi, 1994.
- Modern Europe (Mid Eighteenth to Mid Twentieth Century), (B. A. Course Text Books for the Indira Gandhi National Open University), Indira Gandhi National Open University, New Delhi, 1998–1999.
- The Modern World (M. A. Course Text Books for the Indira Gandhi National Open University), Indira Gandhi National Open University, New Delhi, 2004–2005.
- Selected Works of Jawaharlal Nehru (Second Series), ed., vol.44, Oxford University Press, India.
- Selected Works of Jawaharlal Nehru (Second Series), ed., vol.45, Oxford University Press, India.
- Selected Works of Jawaharlal Nehru (Second Series), ed., vol.46, Oxford University Press, India.
- Selected Works of Jawaharlal Nehru (Second Series), ed., vol.47, Oxford University Press, India.
- Selected Works of Jawaharlal Nehru (Second Series), ed., vol.48, Oxford University Press, India.
- Selected Works of Jawaharlal Nehru (Second Series), ed., vol.49, Oxford University Press, India.
- Selected Works of Jawaharlal Nehru (Second Series), ed., vol.50, Oxford University Press, India.
- Selected Works of Jawaharlal Nehru (Second Series), ed., vol.51, Oxford University Press, India.
- Selected Works of Jawaharlal Nehru (Second Series), ed., vol.52, Oxford University Press, India.
- Selected Works of Jawaharlal Nehru (Second Series), ed., vol.53, Oxford University Press, India.
- Selected Works of Jawaharlal Nehru (Second Series), ed., vol.54, Oxford University Press, India.
- Selected Works of Jawaharlal Nehru (Second Series), ed., vol.55, Oxford University Press, India.
- Selected Works of Jawaharlal Nehru (Second Series), ed., vol.56, Oxford University Press, India.
- Selected Works of Jawaharlal Nehru (Second Series), ed., vol.57, Oxford University Press, India.
- Selected Works of Jawaharlal Nehru (Second Series), ed., vol.58, Oxford University Press, India.
- Selected Works of Jawaharlal Nehru (Second Series), ed., vol.59, Oxford University Press, India.
- Selected Works of Jawaharlal Nehru (Second Series), ed., vol.60, Oxford University Press, India.
- Selected Works of Jawaharlal Nehru (Second Series), ed., vol.61, Oxford University Press, India.
- Selected Works of Jawaharlal Nehru (Second Series), ed., vol.62, Oxford University Press, India.
- Selected Works of Jawaharlal Nehru (Second Series), ed., vol.63, Oxford University Press, India.
- Selected Works of Jawaharlal Nehru (Second Series), ed., vol.64, Oxford University Press, India.
- Selected Works of Jawaharlal Nehru (Second Series), ed., vol.65, Oxford University Press, India.
- Selected Works of Jawaharlal Nehru (Second Series), ed., vol.66, Oxford University Press, India.
- Selected Works of Jawaharlal Nehru (Second Series), ed., vol.67, Oxford University Press, India.
- Selected Works of Jawaharlal Nehru (Second Series), ed., vol.68, Oxford University Press, India.
- Selected Works of Jawaharlal Nehru (Second Series), ed., vol.69, Oxford University Press, India.
- Selected Works of Jawaharlal Nehru (Second Series), ed., vol.70, Oxford University Press, India.
- Selected Works of Jawaharlal Nehru (Second Series), ed., vol.71, Oxford University Press, India.
- Selected Works of Jawaharlal Nehru (Second Series), ed., vol.72, Oxford University Press, India.
- Selected Works of Jawaharlal Nehru (Second Series), ed., vol.73, Oxford University Press, India.
- Selected Works of Jawaharlal Nehru (Second Series), ed., vol.74, Oxford University Press, India.
- Selected Works of Jawaharlal Nehru (Second Series), ed., vol.75, Oxford University Press, India.
- Selected Works of Jawaharlal Nehru (Second Series), ed., vol.76, Oxford University Press, India.
- Selected Works of Jawaharlal Nehru (Second Series), ed., vol.77, Oxford University Press, India.
- Selected Works of Jawaharlal Nehru (Second Series), ed., vol.78, Oxford University Press, India.
- Selected Works of Jawaharlal Nehru (Second Series), ed., vol.79, Oxford University Press, India.
- Selected Works of Jawaharlal Nehru (Second Series), ed., vol.80, Oxford University Press, India.
- Selected Works of Jawaharlal Nehru (Second Series), ed., vol.81, Oxford University Press, India.
- Selected Works of Jawaharlal Nehru (Second Series), ed., vol.82, Oxford University Press, India.
- Selected Works of Jawaharlal Nehru (Second Series), ed., vol.83, Oxford University Press, India.
- Selected Works of Jawaharlal Nehru (Second Series), ed., vol.84, Oxford University Press, India.
- Selected Works of Jawaharlal Nehru (Second Series), ed., vol.85, Oxford University Press, India.

== Articles ==
- ‘Police Socialism in Tsarist Russia, 1900–1905,’ Studies in History, vol 2, no 1, Jan – June 1986, pp 71–136.
- ‘The Russian Conquest of Inner Asia,’ Societat Catalana d’Economia (Filial de l’Institut d’Estudios Catalans), Annuari, vol 7, Barcelona 1989, pp 120–127.
- ‘Eurasianism as an Ideology for Russia’s Future’, in Economic and Political Weekly, vol 28, no 51, 18 December 1993, pp 2799–2809.
- ‘Politisch-geistige Strömungen im post-sowjetischen Zentralasien,’ (Politico-religious Trends in Post-Soviet Central Asia), Osteuropa, 1994, no 11, pp 1005–1022.
- ‘Evraziistvo – ideologiia budushchego Rossii,’ in E. P. Chelyshev, D. M. Shakhovskoi, eds, Kulturnoe nasledie rossiiskoi emigratsii, Nasledie, Moscow 1994, kniga 1, pp 80–87.
- ‘The Modernity and Russianness of Alexander Pushkin’, The Book Review, vol 23, no. 7, July 1999, pp. 3–6.
- ‘Minorities in the Soviet Union,’ D. L. Sheth & Gurpreet Mahajan, eds, Minority Identities and the Nation-State, Oxford University Press, New Delhi, 1999, pp 273–288; earlier in Studies in Humanities and Social Sciences (Journal of the Inter-University Centre for Humanities and Social Sciences, Shimla), vol 4, no 1, 1997, pp 175–189.
- ‘Regulating Grievances through the Petition’, in Madhavan K. Palat, ed., Social Identities in Revolutionary Russia, Palgrave, UK, St Martin’s Press, New York, 2001, pp. 86–112.
- ‘Tezis o Rossii kak “normal’nom obshchestve” (Razmyshleniia po povodu knigi B. N. Mironova “Sotsial’naia istoriia Rossii perioda imperii”’, in Rossiia i sovremennyi mir, 4(33) 2001, pp. 144–159.
- ‘Rabochii’, Jahrbücher für Geschichte Osteuropas, (Neue Folge), Band 50, Heft 3, 2002, pp. 345–374.
- ‘The British in Central Asia’, History of Civilizations of Central Asia, vol. 6, Towards the Contemporary Period: From The Mid-Nineteenth Century To The End Of The Twentieth Century, co-editors Madhavan K. Palat, Anara Tabyshalieva, UNESCO, Paris, pp. 103–123, 2002.
- ‘The Evolution of Nation States’, History of Civilizations of Central Asia, vol. 6, Towards the Contemporary Period: From The Mid-Nineteenth Century To The End Of The Twentieth Century, co-editors Madhavan K. Palat, Anara Tabyshalieva, UNESCO, Paris, pp. 213–224, 2005.
- ‘Casting Workers as an Estate in Late Imperial Russia,’ in Kritika: Explorations in Russian and Eurasian History, vol. 8, no. 2, Spring 2007, pp. 309–350.
- ‘An Identity for Siberia’, in Suchandana Chatterjee et al. eds, Asiatic Russia: Partnerships and Communities in Eurasia, Maulana Abul Kalam Institute of Asian Studies, Kolkata, Shipra Publications, 2009, pp. 1–14.
- ‘Solzhenitsyn: Historian of Decline and Prophet of Resurrection,’ in L. I. Saraskina, ed., Put’ Solzhenitsyna v kontekste Bol’shogo Vremeni: Sbornik pamiati: 1918–2008, Russkii Put’, Moscow, 2009.
- 'The Interesting Ideas of Eric Hobsbawm', Madhavan K. Palat, pp. 97, published as NMML Occasional Paper, History and Society, New Series, 16.
- 'The Grand Inquisitor and the Holy Fool', Madhavan K. Palat, pp. 35, published as Indian Council for Historical Research Foundation Day Lecture, 2014.
- 'History and Memory', Madhavan K. Palat, pp., Delhi 2014.
- 'Geopolitics or the Dominion of the World', Madhavan K. Palat, pp. 26.
