= James Madison (bishop) =

American bishop and educator (1749–1812)

The Right Reverend James Madison
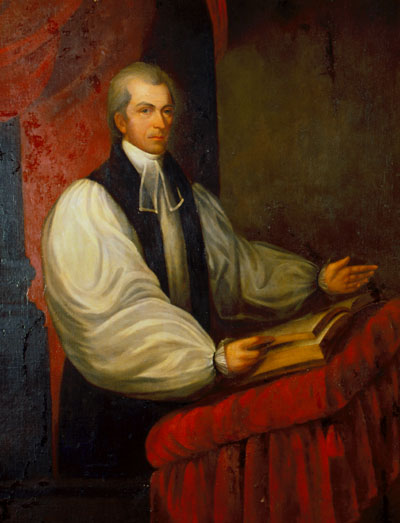

8th President of the College of William & Mary
- In office 1777–1812
- Preceded by: John Camm
- Succeeded by: John Bracken

Personal details
- Born: August 27, 1749 Port Republic, Virginia
- Died: March 6, 1812 (aged 62) Williamsburg, Virginia
- Education: College of William & Mary

Ordination history of James Madison
History
Diaconal ordination
- Ordained by: Richard Terrick, (London)
- Date: 29 September 1775
- Place: Fulham Palace, London
Priestly ordination
- Ordained by: Richard Terrick, (London)
- Date: 1 October 1775
- Place: Fulham Palace, London
Episcopal consecration
- Principal consecrator: John Moore, (Canterbury)
- Co-consecrators: Beilby Porteus (London); John Thomas (Rochester)
- Date: 19 September 1790
- Place: Lambeth Palace Chapel, London

James Madison (August 27, 1749 – March 6, 1812) was the first bishop of the Diocese of Virginia of the Episcopal Church in the United States and the eighth president of the College of William and Mary. He held the latter office from 1777 until his death in 1812—a tenure encompassing the American Revolutionary War, the removal of the Virginian capital from Williamsburg to Richmond, the disestablishment of the Anglican Church, the founding of the Episcopal Church, and the first decades of the new republic. As a leader of both Virginia's religious community and its oldest college, he occupied an influential position in the commonwealth, which he used to agitate for an ideology that blended radical Republicanism, Christianity, and the ideals of the Enlightenment. One historian described him as an "American Jacobin."

Madison, a second cousin of President James Madison, was an active and well-known participant in the intellectual and political life of British America and the early United States. A close associate of Thomas Jefferson and correspondent with prominent figures like astronomer David Rittenhouse and Yale College President Ezra Stiles, he oversaw a host of groundbreaking reforms at William & Mary, including the introduction of the United States' first elective system of study (1779), first honor system (1779), first school of modern languages (1779), first school of law (1779), and first school of modern history (1803). He also ordered the construction of an observatory on campus in 1778 that surviving evidence suggests was meant to be a permanent structure before its untimely destruction (likely during the war-time French occupation of the college). According to one historian, Madison's installation "would almost certainly have been the first documented observatory of any kind associated with an American educational institution."

Madison was also an accomplished scholar and teacher in his own right. A graduate of William & Mary (where he was one of the first recipients of the Botetourt Medal), he taught natural history, mathematics, and political economy—he is credited as the first American professor to offer a course of instruction in the latter. His students included James Monroe, Edmund Randolph, Edward Coles, and Winfield Scott. Madison also experimented with magnetism and psychiatric treatment, made sophisticated meteorological and astronomical observations, and conducted archaeological research in the Kanawha Valley. In 1780, he was elected to the American Philosophical Society.

== Early life and family ==
Madison was born on August 27, 1749 in Barterbrook Augusta County, Virginia, and grew up near the present-day town of Port Republic at Madison Hall, an estate which his father acquired in 1751. He was the son of John and Agatha (née Strother) Madison, prosperous Virginia planters. His mother Agatha was the daughter of William Strother of King George County. On John's side, he was second cousin to James Madison Jr. of Montpelier, who would later be the 4th President of the United States. John Madison himself was a notable figure, serving as a member of House of Burgesses and later the Virginia House of Delegates, as well as the first Court Clerk of Augusta County, a frontier settlement. During the French and Indian War, he constructed fortifications on the family estate.

Madison grew up at Madison Hall with several siblings who went on to live noteworthy lives. His eldest brother, William Strother Madison, fought in the Revolutionary War and died of smallpox in 1782. Another brother, Thomas Madison, married Patrick Henry's sister Susanna and was a soldier and member of the House of Delegates representing Botetourt County—he signed the Fincastle Resolutions in 1775. His youngest brother, George Madison, fought in the Revolutionary War, Northwest Indian War, and the War of 1812, in which he was captured at the Battle of Frenchtown. He was later elected the sixth Governor of Kentucky.

== Education ==
Madison was educated at home and at a private school in Maryland before matriculating at the College of William and Mary in 1768. His undergraduate years in Williamsburg coincided with the arrival of two notable British professors and clergymen, Reverend Samuel Henley (1740–1815) and Reverend Thomas Gwatkin (1741–1800). Henley, chair of moral philosophy, was a daring intellectual whose Socinianism, deism, and republican theology embroiled him in controversy with the conservative members of the Virginia elite. Gwatkin, a friend of Jeremy Bentham, held the chair of natural philosophy and mathematics and engaged extensively with Enlightenment thought.

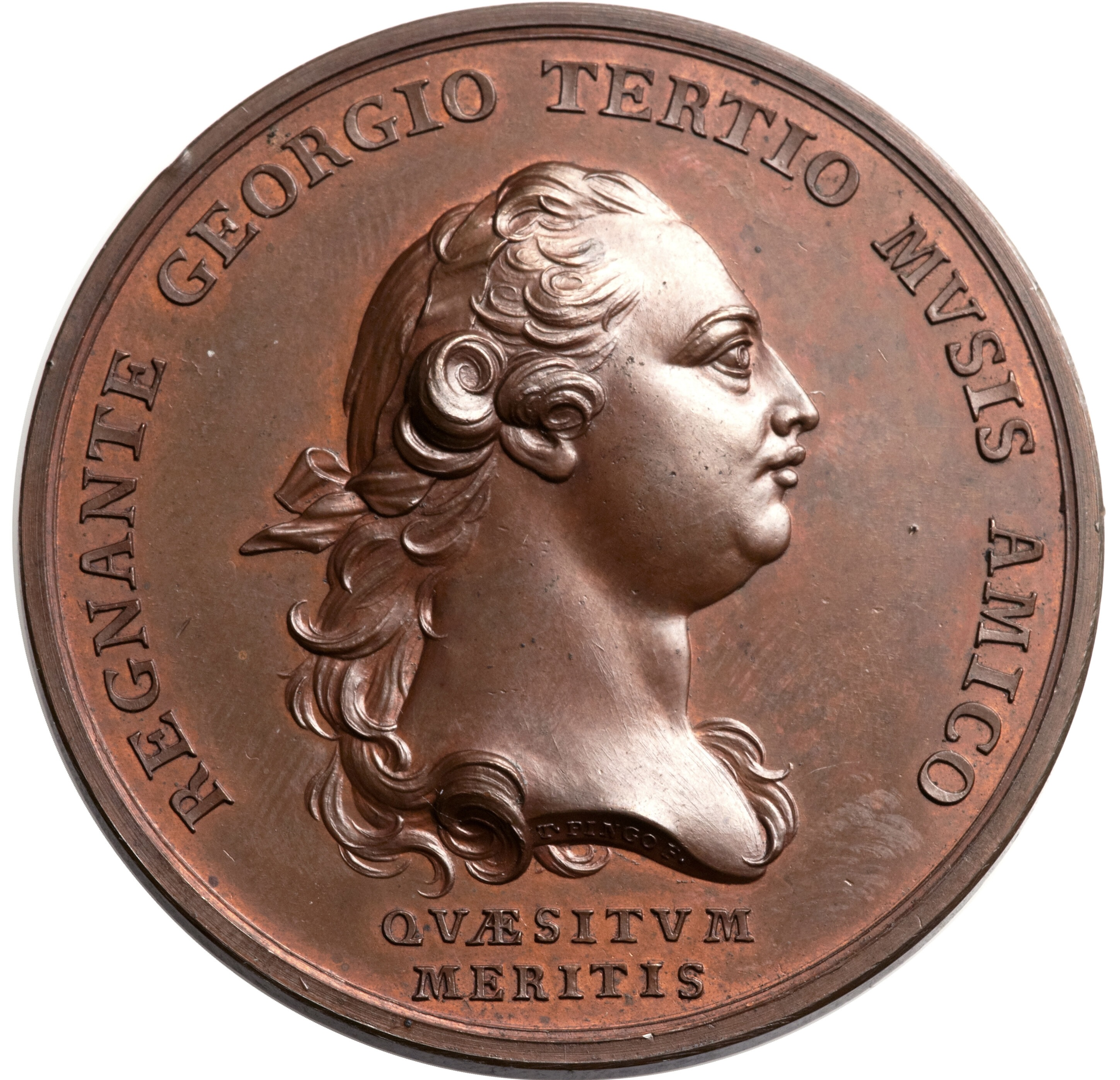
Madison was one of the first two recipients of the Botetourt Medal

Madison graduated from William & Mary with high honors in 1771. On July 29, 1772, he received the gold Botetourt Medal endowed as a prize for classical learning by the Governor of Virginia, Norborne Berkeley, 4th Baron Botetourt. That same summer, in August 1772, he delivered an oration at the college that made plain his radical sympathies and support for legislative government.

At this juncture, Madison opted for a legal career. He read law with George Wythe, and was admitted to the bar, though he blundered through the argument in his first trial, an admiralty case in Williamsburg. Despite the encouragement of his father and his friends, he refused to practice further.

== Early career ==
=== Professor of Natural History and Mathematics, Anglican Minister ===
In 1773, Madison's former professor Thomas Gwatkin vacated William & Mary's chair of natural philosophy and mathematics to become master of the college's grammar school. William & Mary President John Camm offered the position to Madison, who accepted, though he was now also dedicated to seeking ordination in the Anglican church. This was no easy task in British America, however, as there was no bishop in the colonies. For this reason, in 1775, during the opening of the American Revolutionary War, Madison set sail for England to be consecrated by Richard Terrick, Bishop of London. Despite the risks of the long journey in the midst of a war, Madison had little trouble achieving his objective, and in the fall of that year, he was ordained a deacon and then a priest by Bishop Terrick. Decades later, his famous second cousin U.S. President James Madison, would share with a biographer that while Madison was in England he also met with Scottish historian William Robertson. Robertson told his young patriotic visitor that whether the revolutionary war was right or not, he was baffled that the colonies believed they could actually resist the crown—he was unaware that almost at this exact time General John Burgoyne was surrendering at Saratoga. For his part, Madison had no interest in staying longer than was necessary in Britain, which he found to be "degenerate" and "anti-American." His mission fulfilled, he departed for Virginia.

Much had changed in Williamsburg in his absence. His former teachers and current colleagues Henley and Gwatkin, both ardent loyalists, saw the growing popular support for the patriot cause and decided to return to Great Britain with Lady Dunmore, the wife of the royal governor, John Murray, 4th Earl of Dunmore. Before departing, Henley entrusted his valuable personal library to Madison for safekeeping. When it became clear after the war that Henley would never return to Virginia, part of the collection was sold to Thomas Jefferson. President Camm, also a loyalist who had once drawn the ire of Virginian elites in the "Parson's Cause," opted to stay in Williamsburg and lead the William & Mary in accordance with its royal charter. In November 1776, however, his inflexibility led to a direct conflict with Madison when the young professor proposed that King George III's name be removed from the surveyors' licenses issued by the college. Camm opposed the suggestion, holding that it violated the royal charter. In turn, in 1777, the college's patriotic Board of Visitors charged Camm with "neglect and misconduct" and had him removed. With loyalism snuffed out at the college, the Board sought a patriot for the now-vacant presidency.

Madison, a republican clergyman and professor who had taken the initiative to organize his students into a militia company, was the clear choice. Though only 27 years old, he was selected as the eighth president of the College of William and Mary. The Board evidently viewed this as a stop-gap measure, as his term was only supposed to last one year.

== President of William & Mary ==
=== A College in Distress ===
When Madison took office in 1777, William & Mary was barely a college at all. The revolutionary war had put an end to its revenues via royal grants, leaving it bankrupt. Moreover, it hardly had a faculty: the Board had dismissed two other professors when it removed Camm, meaning that only Madison and the master of the grammar school, John Bracken, were left to teach. Madison sought to remedy the financial situation by selling some of the college's land and enslaved people, as well as raising fees and cutting costs. He filled the vacant chair in moral philosophy by appointing Reverend Robert Andrews, a graduate of the College of Philadelphia, to the post.

=== Jefferson's Reforms ===
In 1779, William & Mary's fortunes changed. For half a decade, Thomas Jefferson, then a member of the House of Delegates, had tried in vain to pass legislation that would sweep away any ecclesiastical or royal elements of the college and completely overhaul its structure, governance, and finances. It was only when he became governor in 1779 and then a member of the college's Board of Visitors that he was able to pursue a streamlined version of his reforms. Spurred by Jefferson, the Board abolished William & Mary's two divinity professorships and its grammar school (meaning that its master, Bracken, an opponent of the reforms whom Jefferson referred to as the "simpleton Bracken" was out of a job). To replace these three positions, the Board announced new professorships in "Law & Police" (filled by George Wythe), "Modern Languages" (filled by Carlo Bellini), and "Chymistry & Medicine" (filled by James McClurg). It also modified Andrews' position, making him chair of "Ethics & the Belles Lettres." These were the United States' first professorships in law, modern languages, and fine arts.

In a 1780 letter to Yale College president Ezra Stiles, Madison proudly described his new republican and secular "university," which afforded students unprecedented freedom to choose their courses:

"The Doors of the University are open to all, nor is even a knowledge in the Ant. Languages a previous Requisite for Entrance. The Students have the Liberty of attending whom they please, and in what order they please, or all the diffr Lectures in a Term if they think proper—"

Jefferson's revolution would soon have to give way to the broader revolution unfolding in the colonies, however. With Benedict Arnold's British troops now on the Virginia Peninsula, the state legislature voted in April 1780 to permanently move the capital from Williamsburg to Richmond. By June 1781, British forces had invested Williamsburg and General Cornwallis had evicted Madison from the President's House to set up his personal headquarters. The French commandeered the campus a few months later and used it to treat their wounded during the Siege of Yorktown. In November, the interior of the President's House was destroy by a fire. The college would not open again until October 1782.

=== The Republican university ===
Though Jefferson had completely lost faith in his alma mater with the departure of Wythe, Madison' college was popularly viewed as a hotbed for the future president's Francophile Republicanism in the 1790s and 1800s. Students called each other "citizen" and loathed the Federalists so much that some burned an effigy of President John Adams in 1798 and balked at Madison's proposal to don mourning crape following the death of George Washington.

In 1805, theologian Samuel Miller of the Princeton Theological Seminary published an overview of American higher education, lingering on Madison's William & Mary to remark upon the unusual enthusiasm of its students for politics:

"There is probably no college in the United States in which political science is studied with so much ardour, and in which it is considered so preeminently a favourite subject, as in this."

The 1807 map of Virginia, commissioned by Madison

Madison sought to step down from his duties as bishop in 1805; whether an assistant bishop was chosen, as he appears to have wished, is somewhat unclear. He remained as President of the College of William and Mary for 35 years, serving until his death, although quite infirm in his last years and unable to attend the General Convention. Bishop Madison died in Williamsburg on March 6, 1812, about a year after he ordained future bishop William Meade as a deacon.

The Reverend Dr. Madison also presided over the first convention of the newly formed Diocese of Virginia of the Episcopal Church in the United States of America in 1785 and was consecrated as a bishop on September 19, 1790, in the Lambeth Palace in London.

== Death ==
Madison's health began to falter in late middle-age as he suffered from heart disease. As early as 1805, he had proposed that the Episcopal Church elect an assistant bishop to aid him with his duties—he was afraid that he lacked the stamina to keep up. His condition took a significant turn for the worse in late 1811 and on February 1, 1812, he wrote a letter to his second cousin, then-President James Madison. "My Health, I fear, is gone," Madison wrote. "I am now labouring under Dropsy." Just over a month later, on March 6, 1812, he died.

Madison, who had served William & Mary as a professor and president for nearly 40 years, was interred in the college chapel—an honor given to only a select few, including popular colonial governor Norborne Berkeley, 4th Barton Botetourt and Founding Father Peyton Randolph. Immediately after his death, students founded the Bishop James Madison Society, a secret society that remains active more than 200 years later.

Madison was succeeded as president of William & Mary by Reverend John Bracken, his longtime colleague and master of the William and Mary grammar school. By then, Bracken was himself in poor health and unprepared to steer the college through the War of 1812. His tenure would only last until 1814, when the Board forced his resignation. The subsequent decades witnessed a reactionary turn away from Madison's republicanism at the college, reaching its apex with the ascension of proslavery ideologist Thomas Roderick Dew to the presidency in 1836.

== Consecrators ==
- The Most Reverend John Moore, 88th Archbishop of Canterbury
- The Right Reverend Beilby Porteus, Bishop of London
- The Right Reverend John Thomas, Bishop of Rochester
- James Madison was the 4th bishop consecrated for the Episcopal Church.

== See also ==
- College of William and Mary
- History of Virginia
- Historical list of bishops of the Episcopal Church in the United States of America
