= John Bracken (priest) =

19th-century American priest

The Reverend John Bracken

9th President of the College of William & Mary
- In office 1812–1814
- Preceded by: James Madison
- Succeeded by: John Augustine Smith

Personal details
- Education: College of William & Mary

John Bracken was an American priest of the Episcopal Church who was the rector of Bruton Parish Church and the ninth president of the College of William and Mary, serving from 1812 to 1814. In 1792, Bracken helped to reestablish the Grammar School at the College of William and Mary.
