= Pogodin, Volgograd Oblast =

Pogodin Погодин
- Khutor
- Location within Volgograd Oblast Location within Russia
- Coordinates: 48°34′N 43°08′E
- Country: Russia
- Region: Volgograd Oblast
- District: Surovikinsky District
- Time zone: UTC+4:00

Pogodin (Russian: Погодин) is a rural locality (a khutor) in Lysovskoye Rural Settlement, Surovikinsky District, Volgograd Oblast, Russia. The population was 102 as of 2010. There are 2 streets.

== Geography ==
Pogodin is located near the Lake, 40 km east of Surovikino (the district's administrative centre) by road. Buratsky is the nearest rural locality.
