= Nikolai N. Bolkhovitinov =

Nikolai N. Bolkhovitinov (October 26, 1930 - October 1, 2008) was a groundbreaking Russian/Soviet historian who specialized in U.S. history and Soviet - US relations. During the Cold War, he was known as “the best Russian friend of American historians.”

== Education ==
Born in Moscow, Russia, Bolkhovitinov entered the Moscow Institute of International Relations in 1948, where he studied world history with an emphasis on U.S. diplomatic history. In 1959, Bolkhovitinov received his doctorate in U.S. history from Moscow Pedagogical Institute, where he studied under Aleksei V. Efimov. His PhD (kandidatskaia) dissertation was about the origin and character of the Monroe Doctrine.

== Career and scholarship ==
Bolkhovitinov was a senior research associate at the Institute of General History of the Academy of Sciences USSR. He was a lecturer and consultant on American History at Moscow University (1967-1974), and taught at Simferopol University in Crimea (1974-1975). In 1975 he was a fellow with the Kennan Institute and from 1988 he was director of the Center for North American Studies at the Institute of World History of the Russian Academy of Sciences. Starting in 1992 he was a member of the Russian Academy of Sciences. In addition to studying Russia - U.S. diplomatic and political relations, his scholarship focused on the cultural and social dimensions of that relationship. In January 2006, Bolkhovitinov was awarded an Honorary Foreign Membership in the American Historical Association. He died of a massive heart attack in Moscow on October 1, 2008

== Selected works ==
- The Beginnings of Russian-American Relations, 1775-1815, translated by Elena Levin (Harvard University Press, 1975) ISBN 13: 9780674064553
- Russia and the American Revolution, Translated and edited by C. Jay Smith (Diplomatic Press, January 1, 1976)
- Russian-American Relations and the Sale of Alaska, 1834-1867, translated and edited by Richard A. Pierce (The Limestone Press, Kingston Ontario, Fairbanks Alaska, 1996; First published as Russko-Amerikanskie otnosheniia i prodasha Aliaski, 1834-1967 Moscow; Nauka, 1990)
- The American Revolution and the Russian Empire, paper delivered at the fourth Library of Congress Symposium on the American Revolution, held at the Coolidge Auditorium on May 8 and 9, 1976; published in The Impact of the American Revolution Abroad, pages 81-88.
