= Alexander Tyumenev =

Alexander Ilyich Tyumenev (Russian: Александр Ильич Тюменев; 24 October 1880 – 1 June 1959) was a Russian and Soviet classical historian and orientalist.

== Biography ==
He was born into the family of the writer and bibliophile Ilya Tyumenev (1855–1927). His great grandfather Fyodor Tyumenev was the mayor of Rybinsk.

In 1899, Tyumenev graduated from the 6th St. Petersburg Gymnasium with a gold medal and in 1904, from the Faculty of History and Philology of St. Petersburg University. He studied the history of Russia, primarily the 16th–17th centuries, under the supervision of Professor Sergey Platonov. From 1905 to 1917 he was engaged in "scientific and literary work" without being tied to specific institutions.

From 1928 to 1931 he was a research fellow at the Leningrad branch of the Communist Academy. From 1931 to 1938 he was a research fellow at the State Academy of the History of Material Culture. He taught at Leningrad University. In 1932, he was elected an academician of the Academy of Sciences in the section on ancient history.

He was buried at the Komarovskoye Cemetery.

== Works ==
Tyumenev became an adherent of historical materialism early in his career. He considered ancient Eastern and classical societies to be two types of slave-owning societies. He was the author of one of the first Marxist works on the history of classical societies. The main attention in them was paid to the socio-economic features of Old Testament history and its connection with antiquity. He was the first to apply the concept of a slave-owning formation to the history of ancient Greece.
