= Ulyanovsk State Pedagogical University =

University in Ulyanovsk, Russia

- Ульяновский государственный педагогический университет имени И.Н.Ульянова
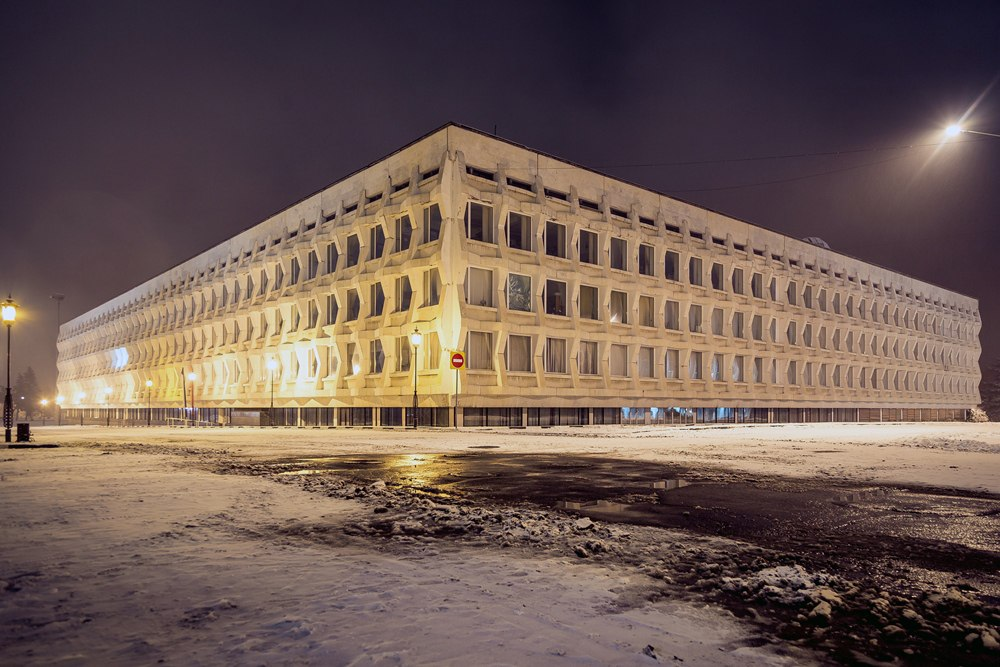
- Ulyanovsk State Pedagogical University main building
- Other names: Ilya Ulyanov State Pedagogical University
- Type: Public
- Established: 1932
- Location: Ulyanovsk, Russia; 54.3174°N 48.4062°E
- Website: http://www.ulspu.ru/

Ilya Ulyanov State Pedagogical University (Russian: Ульяновский государственный педагогический университет имени И.Н.Ульянова) is a major higher education and research institution in Ulyanovsk. It was established in 1932.
